= Persia and Iraq Command =

WW2 British Army organization

- Formation sign
- Active: 1942–1945
- Country: United Kingdom
- Branch: British Army
- Type: Command
- Size: 134,000–200,000
- Part of: War Office; Ministry of Defence (Army)

The Persia and Iraq Command was a command of the British Army established during the Second World War in September 1942 in Baghdad. Its primary role was to secure from land and air attack the oilfields and oil installations in Persia (officially Iran) and Iraq. Its further role was to ensure the transport of supplies from Persian Gulf ports through Iraq and Persia to the Soviet Union.

== Background ==
During the rebellion in Iraq the command of land forces in the country was passed from the Commander-in-Chief, India (GHQ India) to Middle East Command, as the latter was the only formation that could send effective support for operations in northern Iraq and also because air operations were controlled by the Air Officer Commanding-in-Chief (AOC-in-C), Middle East. In June 1941 following the conclusion of fighting in Iraq command was passed back to India. The British Chiefs of Staff wished to return control of land forces in Iraq back to Middle East Command but decided to let Operation Crusader get underway before making any changes. On 12 December 1941 with Operation Crusader well on the way to success, the German threat from the Caucasus subsided and with the Japanese attacks on Thailand, Malaya and Burma the Chiefs of Staff decided now was the time to make changes to the command structure; to unburden GHQ India so it could now solely "look east" and so that speedier planning could take place for forces in the Middle East and eastern Mediterranean areas. General Sir Archibald Wavell, now the C-in-C, India, opposed such a move as he believed Iraq to be an overburden and distraction to Middle East Command; General Claude Auchinleck, now C-in-C, Middle East Command, believed it to be the right move and would allow speedier planning and the administration and operational aspects of all forces in the Mediterranean Basin and Middle East to be more closely related; the Minister of State also supported such a move as it would help to ease the supply situation and would also, at a later date, help co-ordinate the planning of operations with the United States Armed Forces if they only had one command to deal with. The Defence Committee agreed with the Chiefs-of-Staff and Middle East Command retook over Iraq on 12 January 1942. All forces in Iraq were first known as Iraqforce and then Iraq Command were redesignated British Tenth Army.

== Formation of the command ==
In August 1942 the British Prime Minister, Winston Churchill, accompanied by a senior delegation including the Chief of the Imperial General Staff, General Alan Brooke, held discussions in Cairo which resulted in a reorganisation of Middle East Command. This included the replacement of Auchinleck in his role as GOC-in-C Middle East by General Harold Alexander and in his role as British Eighth Army commander by Lieutenant-General Bernard Montgomery and the splitting of Middle East Command to create a new Persia and Iraq Command. Aware that the Commander-in-Chief, Middle East Command needed to devote his full attention to halting the German-Italian forces in North Africa, Churchill wanted to free him of the burden of the forces in Iraq and Persia. With Commander-in-Chief, India also having to devote his full-time attention to fighting the Japanese the solution seemed to be the creation of a new command to guard the northern front.

After some resistance the British cabinet approved its creation on 8 August and Auchinleck was offered the command but turned it down. He opposed the idea of the new command, believing that all forces in Iraq and Persia should be under the same leadership as those in the Middle East area. The War Cabinet believed that with the renewed threat from the Caucasus that the argument for a unified command was even stronger now, than it had been in January.

On 21 August 1942, the Persia Iraq Command was offered to General Sir Henry Maitland Wilson who accepted the post. On 18 September, the headquarters was opened in Baghdad. Wilson's tasks were as follows: First, to secure, at all costs, the oil fields and oil installations in Persia and Iraq from land and air attack. Second, to ensure the transport of supplies to Russia from the Persian Gulf ports to the maximum extent possible without prejudicing the primary task.

== Transition of commanders ==
In 1943, a series of Soviet victories in southern Russia and the success of operations in North Africa rendered the German threat to northern Persia progressively more and more unlikely. Therefore, the forces in Wilson's Command were reduced and the status of the Command was revised. In January, Wilson received orders to despatch the 5th Infantry Division to the Middle East Command and, on 23 January, Wilson was summoned to a conference with the Prime Minister in Cairo. On 10 February, the 56th (London) Infantry Division was also ordered to the Middle East Command. Wilson then decided to re-group the remaining formations within the Command and issued orders for their location in the general area Mosul-Kirkuk. On 17 February, Wilson left for Cairo to take up his new duties as commander-in-chief of the Middle East Command.

The commanders-in-chief were:

- 1942 - 1943 Lieutenant General Sir Henry Maitland Wilson
- 1943 - 1944 Lieutenant General Sir Henry Pownall
- 1944 - 1945 Lieutenant General Sir Arthur Smith

== Order of battle – Persia and Iraq Command 1942 ==
General Officer Commanding - General Sir Henry Maitland Wilson

- General Reserve troops
  - 5th Indian Infantry Division - Major-General Harold R. Briggs
    - 9th Indian Infantry Brigade - Brigadier W.H. Langran
    - 161st Indian Infantry Brigade - Brigadier D.F.W. Warren
  - 3rd Carpathian Rifle Division - Major-General Stanisław Kopański
  - British 7th Armoured Brigade - Brigadier John H. Anstice
- British Tenth Army - Lieutenant-General Sir Edward Quinan
  - Army troops
    - 6th Indian Infantry Division - Major-General James N. Thomson
      - 27th Indian Infantry Brigade - Brigadier A.R. Barker
      - 6th Duke of Connaught's Own Lancers
    - 31st Indian Armoured Division - Major-General Robert Wordsworth
      - 3rd Indian Motor Brigade - Brigadier A.A.E. Filoze
      - 252nd Indian Armoured Brigade - Brigadier G. Carr-White
    - 10th Indian Motor Brigade - Brigadier Harold Redman
  - III Corps - Lieutenant-General Sir Desmond Anderson
    - 5th Infantry Division - Major-General Horatio P.M. Berney-Ficklin
      - 13th Infantry Brigade - Brigadier V.C. Russell
      - 15th Infantry Brigade - Brigadier H.R.N. Greenfield
      - 17th Infantry Brigade - Brigadier G.W.B. Tarleton
      - 5th Reconnaissance Regiment, Reconnaissance Corps
  - Indian XXI Corps - Lieutenant-General Sir Mosley Mayne
    - 8th Indian Infantry Division - Major-General Charles O. Harvey
      - 17th Indian Infantry Brigade - Brigadier F.A.M.B. Jenkins
      - 19th Indian Infantry Brigade - Brigadier C.W.W. Ford
    - 10th Indian Infantry Division - Major-General Alan B. Blaxland
      - 20th Indian Infantry Brigade - Brigadier L.E. MacGregor
      - 25th Indian Infantry Brigade - Brigadier A.E. Arderne
    - 56th (London) Infantry Division - Major-General Eric G. Miles
      - 167th (London) Infantry Brigade - Brigadier J.C.A. Birch
      - 168th (London) Infantry Brigade - Brigadier K.C. Davidson
      - 169th (London) Infantry Brigade - Brigadier L.O. Lynne

In addition, lines of communication headquarters, either designed Lines of Communications Areas or Sub-Areas or under deception titles such as the 2nd Indian Infantry Division, were also ultimately responsible to the command.

== See also ==
- RAF Iraq Command
- AHQ Iraq and Persia

== Notes ==
Footnotes

Citations
