= 56th (King's Own) Anti-Tank Regiment, Royal Artillery =

56th (King's Own) Anti-Tank Regiment
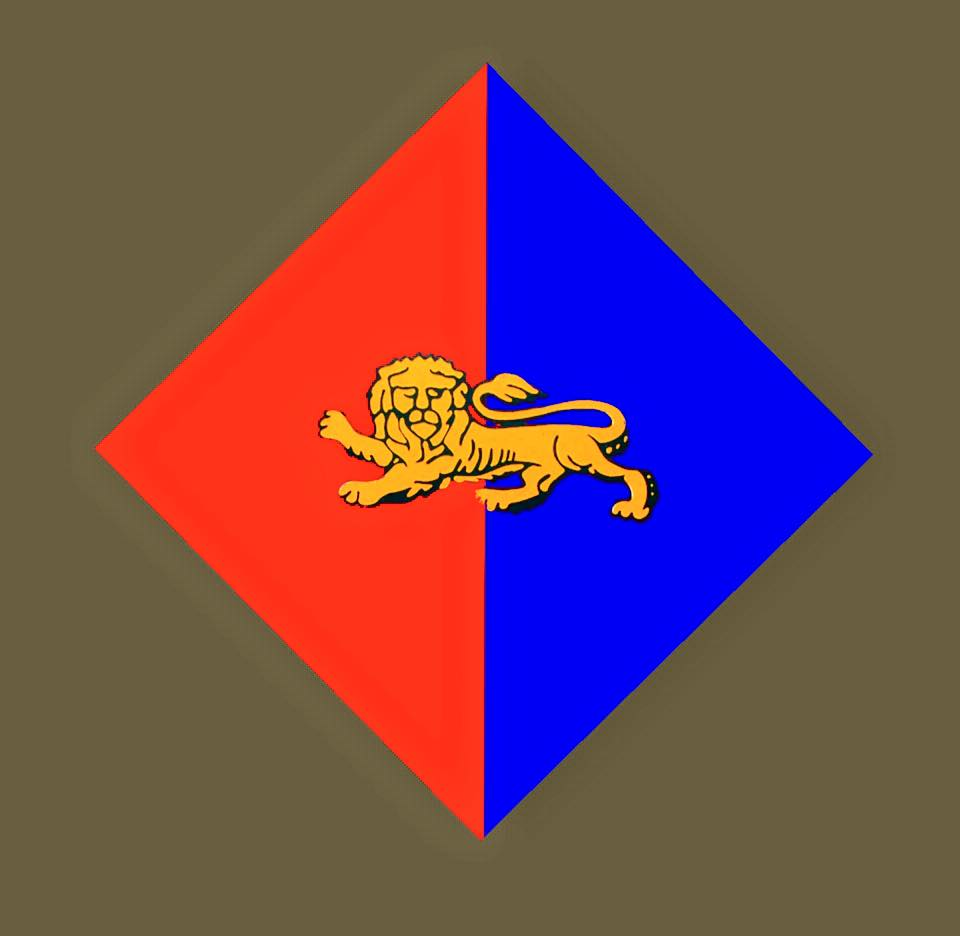
- Bush hat badge and PA patch worn in Burma
- Active: 1938–1961
- Country: United Kingdom
- Branch: Territorial Army
- Role: Anti-Tank artillery
- Size: Regiment
- Garrison/HQ: Ulverston
- Mottos: RA mottoes: Quo Fas Et Gloria Ducunt ("Where Right And Glory Lead"; in Latin fas implies "sacred duty"); Ubique (Everywhere)
- Engagements: Battle of France; Dunkirk Evacuation; Burma Campaign

The 56th (King's Own) Anti-Tank Regiment was a Territorial Army unit of the British Army's Royal Artillery (RA), which was converted from the 4th Battalion, King's Own Royal Regiment (Lancaster). During the Second World War, it first served with the 42nd (East Lancashire) Division in the Battle of France and Dunkirk evacuation in May–June 1940. In 1942, it was sent to join the 70th Infantry Division in India, where it was converted into a Light Anti-Aircraft/Anti-Tank Regiment. In this guise, it served in the Burma Campaign, mainly with the 5th Indian Infantry Division. It was reconverted to the anti-tank role in late 1944 and in June 1945 it returned to India as a training unit. It continued serving in the TA postwar until 1961, when it re-merged into the King's Own.

== Origin ==
56th (King's Own) Anti-Tank Regiment, Royal Artillery was formed in 1938 by the conversion of the 4th Battalion, The King's Own Royal Regiment (Lancaster), a Territorial Army (TA) battalion based at Ulverston in the Furness area of north Lancashire (now in Cumbria). It formed the anti-tank regiment of the TA's 42nd (East Lancashire) Division. The regiment comprised four anti-tank batteries: 221, 222, 223 and 224.

The TA was doubled in size after the Munich Crisis and the 56th A/T Rgt formed a duplicate regiment at Crosby, near Liverpool, on 9 May 1939. Originally, this was to be 61st A/T Rgt, but the designation was changed to 66th Anti-Tank Regiment on 1 June, and it was recruited to full strength by July. The regiment consisted of 261, 262, 263 and 264 A/T Btys.

== Second World War ==
=== Mobilisation ===
In September 1939, the unit was mobilised at Ulverston and went to guard important points at Barrow in Furness docks.

=== Battle of France ===
The 42nd Division joined the British Expeditionary Force (BEF) in France in April 1940. The 56th provided the defence on a section of the Dunkirk perimeter before being evacuated:

- 3 April 1940 – Advance party of regiment move to France.
- 21 April 1940 – All of the regiment are now in France.
- 10 May 1940 – The German attack begins. The Regiment is bombed by air but received no casualties.
- 27 May 1940 – In the area of Cassel with the 42nd Division. Regiment is ordered to withdraw to Dunkirk.
- 28 May 1940 – 223 Battery in a heavy engagement with the Germans and accounted for the destruction of ten German tanks.
- 29 May 1940 – Regiment at Rousbrugge protecting Lines of Communication.
- 30 May 1940 – Some elements of the Regiment are withdrawn from Dunkirk whilst others defend. The remainder of the unit was later evacuated.
- June 1940 – Regiment based in the North East and Yorkshire in a defensive role.

=== Home service ===
Following its return to the UK, the 56th lost men and batteries to form other units.

In September 1941, 224 battery was transferred to the newly formed 83rd A/T Rgt (see below), and raised a new 290 A/T Bty to replace it.

In November 1941, 223 Battery became 1st Air-Landing Anti-Tank Battery. It became the first Royal Artillery unit to fly into battle – on board gliders – serving with 1st Airborne Division in Sicily in 1942 and later at Arnhem in September 1944.

223 Battery, having been permanently detached to 1st Air Landing Rgt, was replaced by 203 (Ross) A/T Bty. This battery had been part of 51st (West Highland) A/T Rgt of 51st (Highland) Division, most of which was captured at St Valery in 1940, remnants of the artillery escaping through Cherbourg. 51st A/T Regiment was placed in 'suspended animation' and 203 Bty transferred to 56th A/T.

=== Far East ===
The 56th had a strong record as a fighting unit; firstly, in Flanders during the 1940 campaign, after which it was evacuated at Dunkirk. Then, after a period at home on Beach Defence and Anti-Invasion roles, it was sent to the Far East.

In 1942–3, Fourteenth Army adopted a new policy with the formation of composite Light Anti-Aircraft/Anti-Tank regiments, each containing two LAA and two A/T batteries. This format was intended to help divisions distribute sub-units with balanced firepower and mutual support in close jungle fighting where battle groups often had to move independently. 56th A/T Regiment was one of those selected for conversion, transferring 203 and 290 Btys to 55th (Devon) LAA Rgt (thus retaining the two original King's Own batteries), and receiving 163 and 164 LAA Btys in exchange in July and August 1943. These were equipped with the Bofors 40 mm gun. The regiment was in training with XV Corps in September 1943, before joining 5th Indian Infantry Division in Burma in October.

The 5th Indian Division was facing the Japanese 55th Division on the coastal flank of the Arakan front. The defeat of the Japanese 55th Division, to which a large share of the credit must go to the Indian 5th Division, was the first decisive victory against the Japanese since they had invaded Burma two years previously. From the victory in the Arakan sector, the 5th Indian Infantry Division was air-lifted to the central front. 161 Brigade joined XXXIII Corps, which was beginning to arrive at Dimapur, and fought in the Battle of Kohima while the remainder of the division reinforced IV Corps, whose land victory at Kohima and Imphal, in which the Division played an important part, proved to be the turning-point of the Burma Campaign. Except for one period of rest and reorganization, the Indian 5th Division continued to fight and to advance throughout the rest of the war, and took part in the final thrust by IV Corps down to Rangoon.

=== Demobilisation ===
During the period from June to August 1945, the 66th A/T Rgt was gradually placed into a state of "suspended animation" and its personnel were posted to the 56th, which had just come out of the line in Burma and was reforming as a Self-Propelled unit in India - approximately 80% of the original 56th's personnel were sent back to England for repatriation and replaced by personnel from the 66th. The 56th was itself also placed into a state of "suspended animation" while its remaining personnel and equipment were returned to England.

=== Commanders ===
The following officers commanded 56th A/T Rgt during the war:

- Lt. Col. B.H. Palmer. (1940–1941)
- Brigadier Claude M. Vallentin (Jul 1941 – Jun 1942)
- Brigadier Robert Mansergh (Jun 1942 – Sep 1944)
- Brigadier Geoffrey B.J. Kellie (Sep 1944 – Jun 1945)
- Brigadier R.G. Loder-Symonds (Jun 1945 – Aug 1945)

=== 66th Anti-Tank Regiment ===
This regiment mobilised in September 1939 as part of the 55th (West Lancashire) Division. In November, it transferred to 59th (Staffordshire) Division, which was being organised as a duplicate of the 55th. In June 1940, it returned to the 55th Division.

At this time, the 55th Division was part of XI Corps defending Essex and Suffolk against possible German invasion. There was very little equipment available: 66 A/T Rgt had only two guns and was acting as infantry, providing a reserve for 164th Brigade. In August, it was assigned to man a number of static 4-inch Naval guns until they were taken over by a medium artillery regiment. That month it received more A/T guns, bringing it up to a total of 10.

In September 1941, 66 A/T Rgt also transferred one of its original batteries (262 Bty) to 83 A/T Rgt, and raised a new 306 Bty to replace it in December. 66th Anti-Tank Regiment remained with 55th Division, serving in various parts of the UK, including a spell in Northern Ireland until July 1944, when it transferred to Home Forces. The regiment remained in the UK throughout the war.

=== 83rd Anti-Tank Regiment ===
This regiment was formed at Clacton in September 1941 for service overseas. It was assembled from batteries of four existing regiments:

- 68 A/T Battery from 14th Anti-Tank Regiment, a Regular Army unit of 4th Division
- 224 A/T Battery from 56th (King's Own) Anti-Tank Regiment, see above
- 262 A/T Battery from 66th Anti-Tank Regiment, see above
- 265 A/T Battery from 67th Anti-Tank Regiment, the 2nd Line TA duplicate of 57th (East Surrey) Anti-Tank Regiment, in 56th (London) Division.

Half of the regiment was therefore drawn from the King's Own, and it was included in the Regimental History. In December 1941, it sailed round the Cape in the same convoy as 56th A/T Rgt, and landed at Basra in Iraq on 1 February 1942, where it joined 8th Indian Division. In April, it was split up between the division's three brigades:

- 68 A/T Bty to 18th Indian Infantry Brigade
- 262 A/T Bty to 17th Indian Infantry Brigade
- 265 A/T Bty to 19th Indian Infantry Brigade

Meanwhile, Regimental HQ and 224 A/T Bty moved to Persia and, together with two field batteries, formed 'Y' Field Regiment (later 165th Field Regiment) under the command of 25th Indian Infantry Brigade of 10th Indian Division:

- RHQ from 83rd A/T Rgt
- 224 A/T Bty from 83rd A/T Rgt
- 463 Bty from 87th (1st West Lancashire) Field Rgt
- 486 Bty from 121 (West Riding) Field Rgt

In July 1942, 26th Indian Brigade moved to Egypt, where 224 A/T Bty left 165 Field Rgt to rejoin the reforming 83rd A/T Rgt, whose other batteries re-assembled from Iraq during August. The regiment then served in North Africa, where it was commanded by Lieut-col Bill Leggatt, and Palestine until it was disbanded in December 1944.

== Postwar ==
When the TA was reconstituted in 1947, the 56th and 66th A/T Rgts reformed as 380 A/T and 390 LAA Rgts respectively.

=== 380 Anti-Tank Regiment ===
The regiment reformed at Ulverston as 380 Anti-Tank Regiment (King's Own) in 42nd (Lancashire) Division. In 1951, it was reorganised and redesignated as a Light Regiment instead of A/T. In 1955, with the disbandment of Anti-Aircraft Command and the reduction in AA units, the regiment absorbed 293 (East Lancashire) LAA Rgt and 556 (East Lancashire) Heavy AA Rgt to form:

380 Light Regiment (King's Own)

- P (Church) Bty from 556 HAA Rgt
- Q (Burnley) Bty from 293 LAA Rgt
- R (Furness) Bty from 380 Light Rgt

Two years later, R Bty was redesignated R (King's Own) Bty.

In a further reduction of the TA in 1961, 380 Light Regt was absorbed into 288 (2nd West Lancashire) LAA Rgt, but R (King's Own) Bty was converted back into infantry and joined 5th Bn King's Own to form A Company in a new 4/5th Bn King's Own, thus completing its journey back to its original regiment.

=== 390 Light Anti-Aircraft Regiment ===
This regiment reformed as 390 Light Anti-Aircraft Regiment (King's Own) with its HQ at Altcar Ranges at Hightown and forming part of 95th Army Group Royal Artillery (AA). However, in 1950, it was amalgamated into 306 HAA Regiment (Lancashire Hussars), becoming R Bty in that unit.

== Equipment ==
As an Anti-Tank Unit, the 56th was supplied with the then new Ordnance Q-F 6 Pounder 7cwt, which replaced the previous equipment of 2 Pounders, used in France and England. During the regiment's time in England in 1940 to 1941, it underwent training on the new 6 Pounder Anti-Tank Gun, which was continued in India prior to its deployment with the 5th Indian Division.

| 2-pounder anti-tank gun | 4-inch Mk IX coast defence gun (at Fort Crosby near Liverpool, August 1940) as used by 66th A/T Rgt. | Ordnance QF 6-pounder Anti-Tank Gun |

== Insignia ==
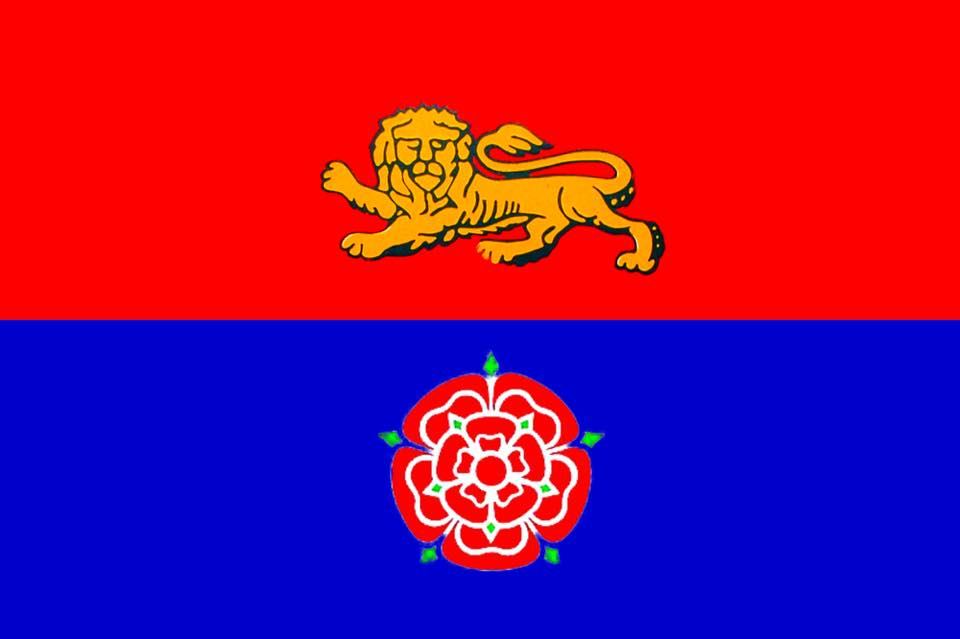
Regimental flag used unofficially during the Second World War.

Initially upon conversion to artillery, the 56th A/T Rgt retained the King's Own cap badge in white metal, though in October 1939 this was replaced by the RA's grenade collar badge, worn as a cap badge. However, all ranks retained the King's Own buttons in service dress. While serving in Burma the regiment wore a white metal King's Own lion collar badge on a red/blue RA diamond patch on the turn-up of their bush hats. While serving with 1st Airborne Division, 223 Bty wore an embroidered shoulder title bearing the words 'ANTI-TANK BATTERY'. The 66th A/T Rgt also retained King's Own buttons on service dress. After the war the regiment wore a red lanyard in place of the white RA one, which it retained as R Bty of 306th HAA Rgt.

== Museums ==
- Kings Own Museum
- Royal Artillery Museum

== Re-enactment Group ==
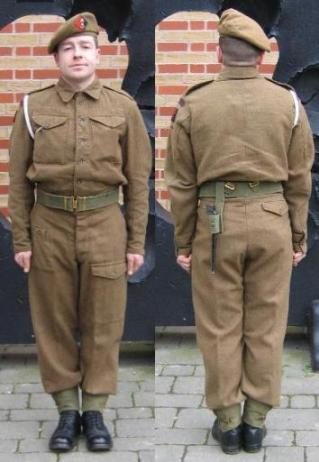
Royal Artillery Gunner's Uniform, note white lanyard.

'Beyond The Chindwin, British in Burma' (non-profit organisation).

== Bibliography ==
- Col Julia Cowper, The King's Own: The Story of a Royal Regiment, Volume III: 1914–1950, Aldershot: Gale & Polden, 1957.
- Gen Sir Martin Farndale, History of the Royal Regiment of Artillery: The Years of Defeat: Europe and North Africa, 1939–1941, Woolwich: Royal Artillery Institution, 1988/London: Brasseys, 1996, ISBN 1-85753-080-2.
- Joslen, H. F. (2003) [1960]. Orders of Battle: Second World War, 1939–1945. Uckfield, East Sussex: Naval and Military Press. ISBN 978-1-84342-474-1.
- Norman E.H. Litchfield, The Territorial Artillery 1908–1988 (Their Lineage, Uniforms and Badges), Nottingham: Sherwood Press, 1992, ISBN 0-9508205-2-0.
- Brig N.W. Routledge, History of the Royal Regiment of Artillery: Anti-Aircraft Artillery 1914–55, London: Royal Artillery Institution/Brassey's, 1994, ISBN 1-85753-099-3.

== External sources ==
- British Army units from 1945 on
- British Military History
- Burma Star Association Last accessed 14/10/2015.
- Peter Donnelly Army:56th Anti-Tank Regiment Royal Artillery (The King's Own) at BBC People's History (20 January 2006). Last accessed 14/10/2015
- Kings Own Museum. (2014). 56th Anti-Tank Regiment, RA. Last accessed 14/10/2015.
- The Royal Artillery 1939–45
- Graham Watson, The Territorial Army 1947
