= Tenth Army (United Kingdom) =

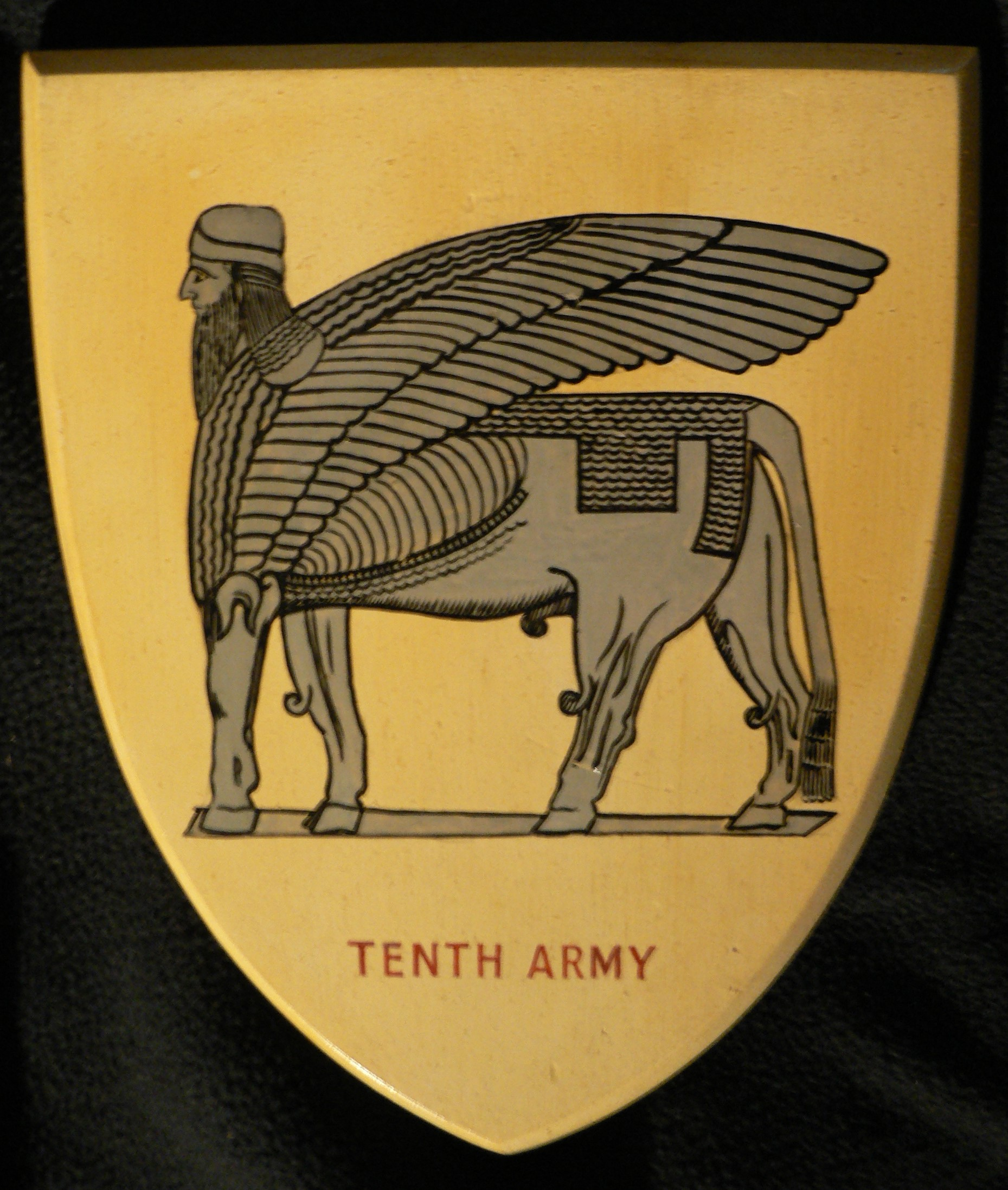
- 10th Army formation badge.
- Active: 1942–1943
- Country: United Kingdom
- Branch: British Army
- Type: Field army
- Part of: Middle East Command; Persia and Iraq Command
- Engagements: Second World War

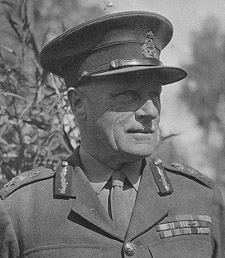
General Sir Edward Quinan, Commander of the 10th Army.

The Tenth Army was a field army of the British Army during the Second World War. It was created in Iraq and formed from the major part of "Paiforce" (Persia and Iraq Force). It was active between 1942 and 1943, and was then disbanded.

In April 1941, British and Indian troops had been deployed to Iraq from India under the command of Lieutenant-General Edward Quinan to protect British interests, in particular oil concessions, after a coup d'etat had brought to power a government sympathetic to the Axis powers. The force was known as Iraqforce and was engaged in the Anglo-Iraqi War which took place in May, and also took part in the defeat of the Vichy forces in the subsequent Syria-Lebanon campaign. Later in 1941, the force took part in the Anglo-Soviet invasion of Iran to prevent the Axis elements from entering Persia, and preventing the possibility of the Germans gaining control of the Iraqi and Persian oil fields. Following this Iraqforce was renamed Paiforce (Persia and Iraq force).

After the campaigns of 1941, Quinan's headquarters was renamed Tenth Army and its main task was the maintenance of the lines of communication to the Soviet Union from the Persian Gulf to the Caspian Sea and the protection of the South Persian and Iraqi oilfields. Its badge was a golden Lamassu (Assyrian Ox) with human head and eagle's wings (a Cherub Guardian). A variation of colouring of this badge was a white Ox on a pale blue background. Quinan was knighted in June 1942 and in August 1942, he was promoted to be a full general. The Tenth Army was initially part of Middle East Command but became part of Persia and Iraq Command when it was established in September 1942.

== Order of battle 1942 ==
- Tenth Army commanded by Lieutenant-General Sir Edward Quinan
    - 31st Indian Armoured Division - Major-General Robert Wordsworth
      - 3rd Indian Motor Brigade - Brigadier A.A.E. Filoze
      - 252nd Indian Armoured Brigade - Brigadier G. Carr-White
  - British III Corps, Lieutenant-General Sir Desmond Anderson
    - 5th Infantry Division, Major-General Horatio Berney-Ficklin
      - 13th Infantry Brigade - Brigadier V.C. Russell
      - 15th Infantry Brigade - Brigadier H.R.N. Greenfield
      - 17th Infantry Brigade - Brigadier G.W.B. Tarleton
      - 5th Reconnaissance Regiment, Reconnaissance Corps
  - Indian XXI Corps, Lieutenant-General Sir Mosley Mayne
    - 8th Indian Infantry Division, Major-General Charles Harvey
      - 17th Indian Infantry Brigade - Brigadier F.A.M.B. Jenkins
      - 19th Indian Infantry Brigade - Brigadier C.W.W. Ford
    - 10th Indian Infantry Division - Major-General Alan Blaxland
      - 20th Indian Infantry Brigade - Brigadier L.E. MacGregor
      - 25th Indian Infantry Brigade - Brigadier A.E. Arderne
    - 6th Indian Infantry Division - Major-General James Thomson
      - 27th Indian Infantry Brigade - Brigadier A.R. Barker
      - 6th Duke of Connaught's Own Lancers
    - 10th Indian Motor Brigade - Brigadier Harold Redman
    - 56th (London) Infantry Division, Major-General Eric Miles
      - 167th (London) Infantry Brigade - Brigadier J.C.A. Birch
      - 168th (London) Infantry Brigade - Brigadier K.C. Davidson
      - 169th (London) Infantry Brigade - Brigadier Lewis Lyne
