= 52nd (Manchester) Field Regiment, Royal Artillery =

52nd (Manchester) Field Regiment, RA 252 (Manchester) Field Regiment, RA
- Royal Artillery cap badge
- Active: 1921–1 April 1967
- Country: United Kingdom
- Branch: Territorial Army
- Role: Field artillery
- Size: 2–4 Batteries
- Part of: 42nd (East Lancashire) Division; 76th Infantry Division; 8th Indian Division
- Garrison/HQ: Hyde Road, Ardwick, Manchester
- Engagements: Battle of France; Dunkirk evacuation Barbara Line; Mozzagrogna; Operation Diadem; Operation Olive; Operation Grapeshot

52nd (Manchester) Field Regiment was a Royal Artillery (RA) unit of Britain's part-time Territorial Army (TA) during World War II. It was descended from the Manchester Artillery, first formed in the City of Manchester in 1860. It served in the Battle of France, at the end of which its personnel were evacuated from Dunkirk. It was then sent to the Middle East where it joined 8th Indian Division and fought with this division in the Italian Campaign. It was reformed in the postwar TA, and its successor unit continues as a battery in the present day Army Reserve

== Origin ==
The Manchester Artillery was formed as part of the Volunteer Force in 1860. By the outbreak of World War I it was a 'brigade' (Note: In contemporary RA usage a brigade was a lieutenant-colonel's command consisting of independent batteries 'brigaded' together; it was not comparable with an infantry or cavalry brigade commanded by a brigadier-general.) of the Royal Field Artillery (RFA) in the East Lancashire Division of the Territorial Force. During World War I it served with the division (later the 42nd (East Lancashire) Division) in Egypt before being broken up in 1917. Its second line unit fought with the 66th (2nd East Lancashire) Division on the Western Front 1917–18. It reformed after the war, becoming the 52nd (Manchester) Brigade, RFA, when the TF was reorganised as the Territorial Army (TA) in 1921, with the following organisation:

- Brigade Headquarters at Hyde Road, Ardwick, Manchester
- 205, 206, 207 (East Lancashire) Batteries
- 208 (East Lancashire) Battery (Howitzer)

The brigade was once again part of 42nd (EL) Divisional Artillery. In 1924 the RFA was subsumed into the Royal Artillery (RA), and the word 'Field' was inserted into the titles of its brigades and batteries. In 1938 the RA modernised its nomenclature and a lieutenant-colonel's command was designated a 'regiment' rather than a 'brigade'; this applied to TA field brigades from 1 November 1938. The TA was doubled in size after the Munich Crisis, and most regiments formed duplicates. Part of the reorganisation was that field regiments changed from four six-gun batteries to an establishment of two batteries, each of three four-gun troops. For the Manchester Artillery this resulted in the following organisation from 25 May 1939:

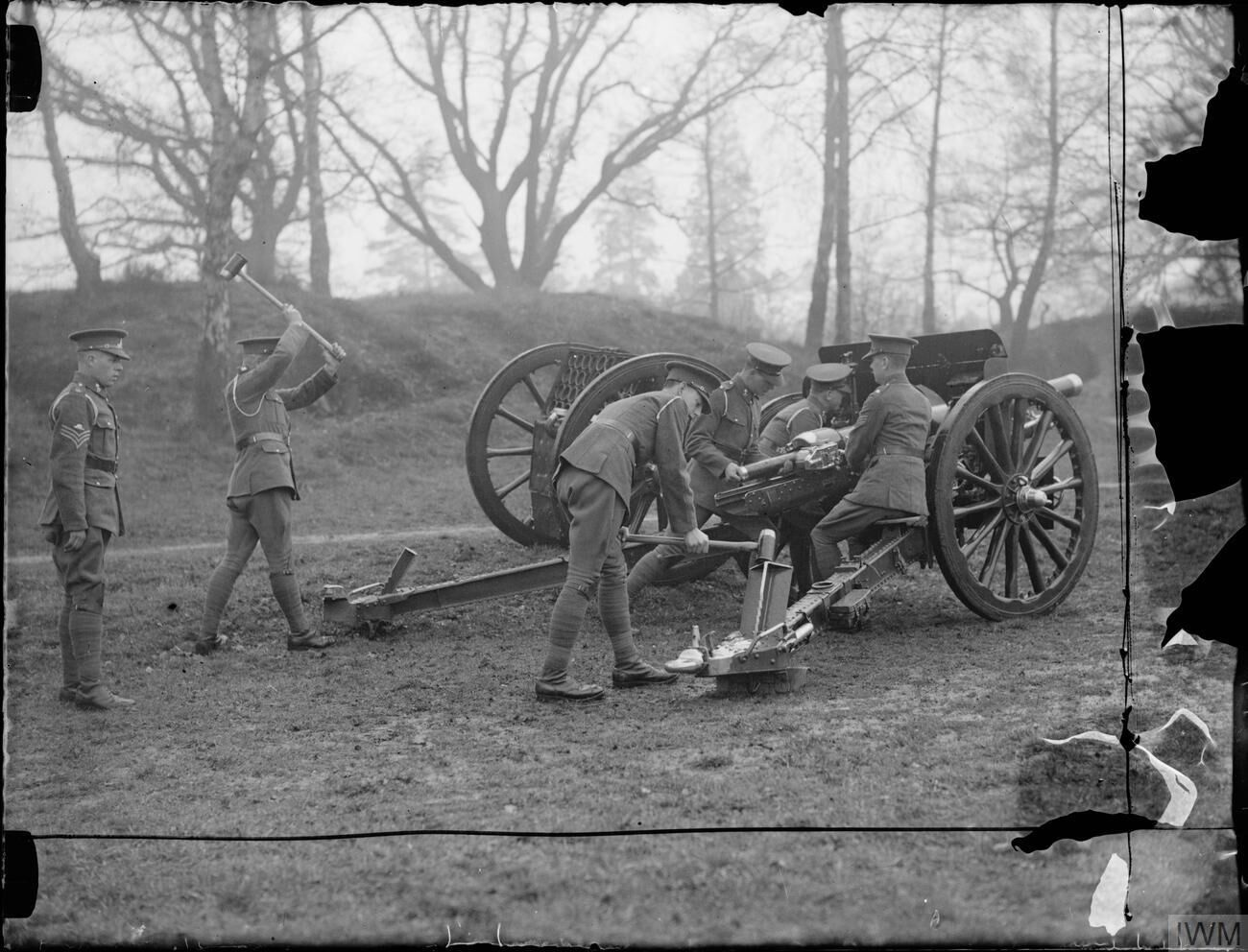
Emplacing an 18-pounder with wooden wheels at the start of World War II

52nd (Manchester) Field Regiment

- Regimental Headquarters (RHQ) at Hyde Road, Manchester
- 205 (East Lancashire) Field Bty
- 206 (East Lancashire) Field Bty

110th Field Regiment (Note: On 17 February 1942 110th Fd Rgt was authorised to use its parent unit's 'Manchester' subtitle.)

- RHQ at Gorton
- 207 (East Lancashire) Field Bty
- 208 (East Lancashire) Field Bty

The Manchester Artillery mobilised on 1 September 1939, just before the outbreak of war, as part of 42nd (EL) Infantry Division, but from 27 September the newly formed 66th Infantry Division took over the duplicate units including 110th Fd Rgt.

== World War II ==
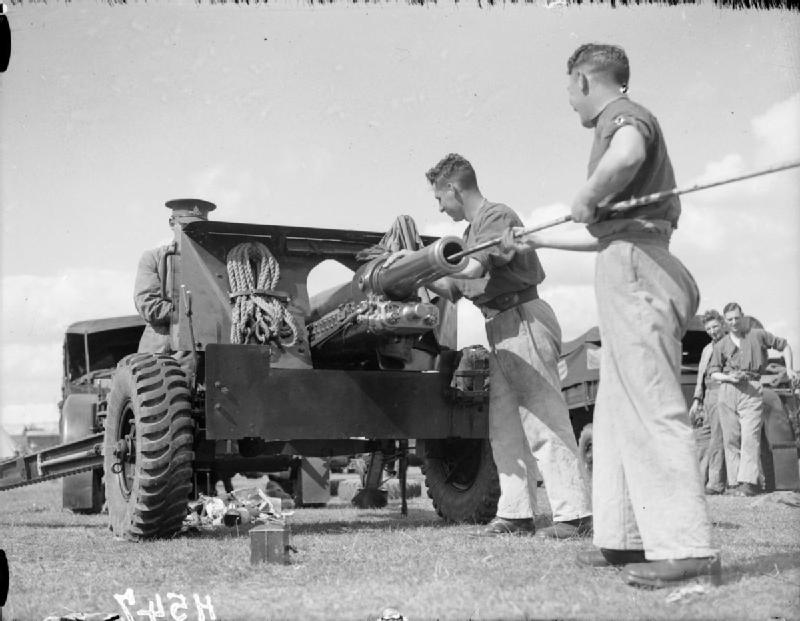
Gunners sponging out an 18/25-pounder Mk V P during exercises in the UK, 1939.

On the outbreak of war 52nd Fd Rgt commanded by Lt-Col E.T. Turner was still equipped with 18-pounder guns and 4.5-inch howitzers from World War I, but while it was training at Haltwhistle in Northumberland it received its first five 18/25-pounders for trial. This stop-gap equipment consisted of the new 25-pounder gun mounted on an 18-pdr carriage with pneumatic tyres. On 22 January 1940 the regiment moved to Newbury, Berkshire, and on 14 March a Regular Army officer, Lt-Col F.C.F. Cleeve, took command. In April 42nd (EL) Division began crossing to France to join the British Expeditionary Force (BEF), and 52nd Fd Rgt arrived on 14 April, fully equipped with 18/25-pdrs.

=== Battle of France ===
52nd Field Rgt was stationed at Lomme, east of Lille, by 25 April 1940. When the German offensive began on 10 May, the BEF advanced into Belgium under Plan D, and by 15 May its leading divisions were in place on the River Dyle. 42nd (EL) Division was to move up to positions further back on the River Escaut in France, so on 16 May 52nd Fd Rgt's advance parties left Lomme for Blandain, west of Tournai. The regiment moved to Cappelle-en-Pévèle next day and by 18 May RHQ was established in a farm at Auchy-lez-Orchies, 205 Bty at Coutiches, south of Orchies with an observation post (OP) at Râches, and 206 Bty nearby at Le Molinel, with an OP at Marchiennes, north-east of Douai. But the Wehrmacht's breakthrough in the Ardennes threatened the BEF's flank, and it had to retreat again. On 19 May 205 Bty moved independently to join 138 Bde of 46th Division at Thumeries and took up anti-tank (A/T) positions spread along 6–7 miles (9.7–11.3 km) of the River Scarpe. (Note: 46th Division was a TA duplicate formation sent to France for labour duties; it had no artillery of its own.) 206 Battery remained in position, except F Trp, which took up similar A/T positions along the canal at Saint-Amand-les-Eaux. By 21 May the whole BEF was back on the Escaut.

As the Germans thrust behind the BEF, 42nd (EL) Division found itself south of Lille and facing east. By 26 May. RHQ was controlling a group consisting of 206 Bty (13 guns) and 2nd Regiment, Royal Horse Artillery (16 guns), with the latter falling back to Mont des Cats; 205 Bty was detached to 2nd Division. On that day the decision was made to evacuate the BEF through Dunkirk (Operation Dynamo). By 28 May Mont des Cats was held by an assorted force of artillery and engineers from 44th (Home Counties) Division, together with some scattered infantry and the remnants of 2nd RHA (two guns) and 52nd (Manchester) Fd Rgt. This rearguard held its position until the rest of 44th (HC) Division had withdrawn to Dunkirk. 42nd Divisional Artillery including 52nd Fd Rgt was evacuated on 30 May, but 205 Bty was still fighting with 2nd Division and did not get away until 2 June.

=== Home defence ===
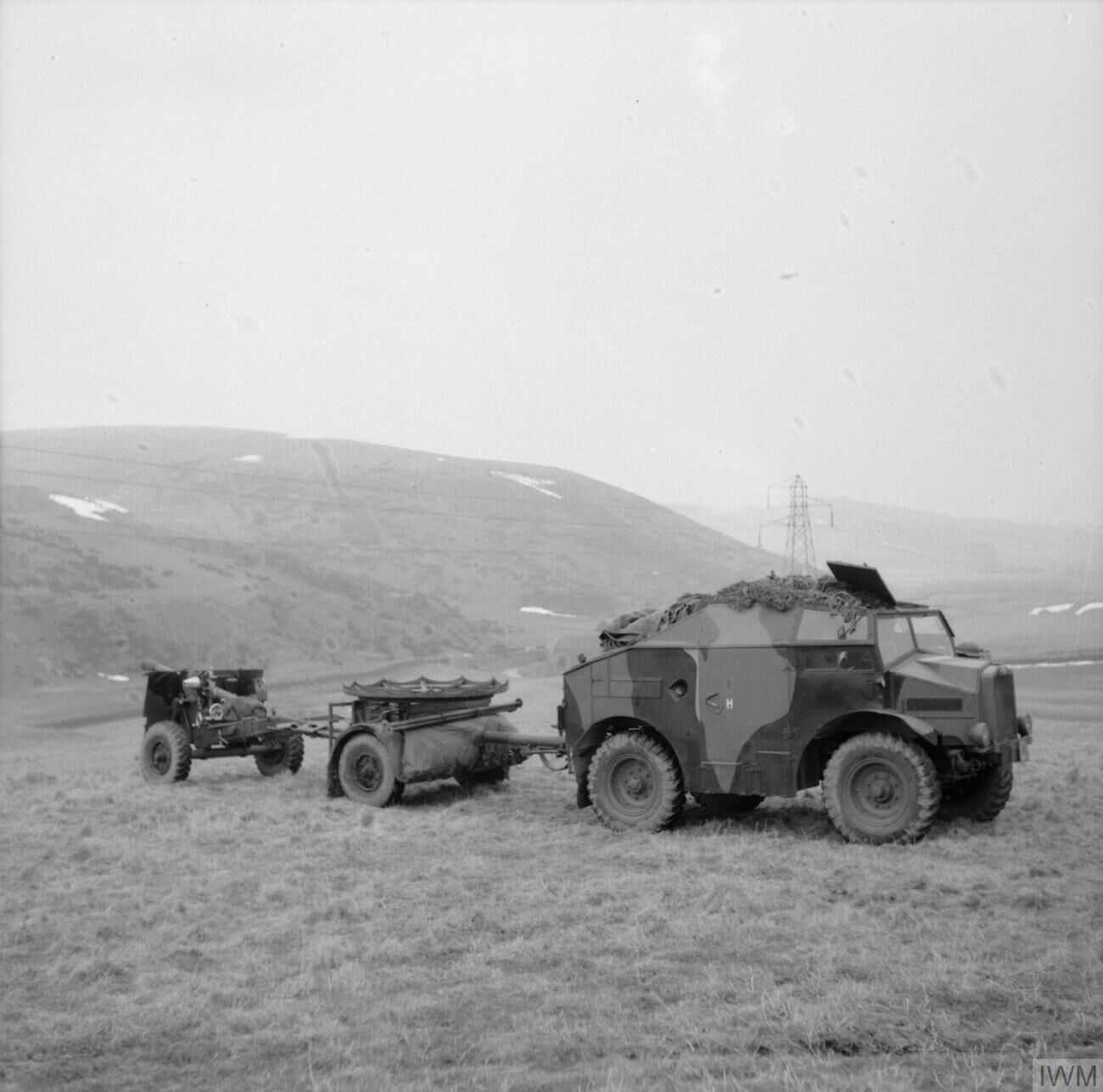
25-pounder gun on exercise in the UK, 1941.

Units returning from France were rapidly reinforced, re-equipped with whatever was available, and deployed for home defence. 52nd Field Rgt assembled at Darlington, County Durham, and then moved to Haydon Bridge in Northumberland where it carried out infantry training. In August, while it was at Hexham, eight World War I French M1897 75mm field guns arrived from the US under Lend-Lease. The regiment next moved to Bedale in North Yorkshire then, when 42nd (EL) Division went south to join IV Corps in September, it was at Lambourn and then Hampstead Norreys in Berkshire. By now it had received eight 4.5-inch howitzers. It continued training, and eventually was fully equipped with Mk II 25-pounders. One of the lessons learned from the Battle of France was that the two-battery organisation did not work: field regiments were intended to support an infantry brigade of three battalions. As a result, they were reorganised into three 8-gun batteries, but it was not until late 1940 that the RA had enough trained battery staffs to carry out the reorganisation. 52nd Field Rgt accordingly formed 'R' Bty, and this was numbered as 437 Fd Bty by 29 March 1941. At this time the regiment was stationed at Yoxford in Suffolk when 42nd (EL) Division was serving in XI Corps.

In the autumn of 1941 it was decided to convert 42nd (EL) Division into an armoured division. 52nd (Manchester) and 53rd (Bolton) Fd Rgts left on 20 October, and joined 76th Infantry Division on 18 November 1941 when that was formed from the Norfolk County Division. The division remained defending Norfolk as part of II Corps. During 1942 large reinforcements were sent from the UK to Middle East Forces, and 52nd Fd Rgt was chosen to join them. It left 76th Division on 23 August 1942 and together with its signal section of the Royal Corps of Signals it came under War Office control preparatory to embarkation.

=== Middle East ===
The regiment landed in Egypt and moved on to Iraq, arriving on 18 January 1943, when it came under the command of 8th Indian Division (along with 53rd (Bolton) Fd Rgt). The division was in Tenth Army, forming part of Paiforce defending the vital oilfields of Iraq and Persia and the line of communications with the Soviet Union. By the spring of 1943 the victories in North Africa and on the Eastern Front had removed the threat to the oilfields, and troops could be released from Paiforce for other theatres. 8th Indian Division moved to Ninth Army in Syria with 52nd Fd Rgt arriving on 6 May 1943.

8th Indian Division was then selected for the forthcoming Italian Campaign. 52nd Field Rgt arrived back in Egypt on 15 September and then embarked with the division for Italy on 18 September.

=== Italy ===
8th Indian Division began disembarking at Brindisi on 23 September, where 52nd Fd Rgt arrived next day. The division joined V Corps, which was leading Eight Army's advance up the east coast of Italy. Operations were slowed by rain and mud, but on the night of 1/2 November 8 Indian Division began attacking across the River Trigno, part of the Barbara Line. 1st Battalion 13th Frontier Force Rifles fought its way up the wooded spurs against the German 3rd Parachute Regiment, and the following night 3rd Bn 8th Punjab Regiment crossed the river to add its weight. On the night of 3/4 November the two battalions attacked Tufillo, 'taking in their stride a German counter-attack which was blown to pieces by the divisional artillery'. There was confused fighting in the dark amongst burning scrub, and by morning the two battalions were pinned down under heavy fire. The Germans were however being forced to thin out their defences, and the paratroopers withdrew, allowing the whole of 8th Indian Division to advance.

==== Mozzagrogna ====
The Germans took up another delaying position, the Bernhardt Line, behind the River Sangro. Eighth Army closed up to the river on 9 November and prepared to assault the position. 78th Division developed a bridgehead, and on 27 November, after the flooded river had fallen, 8th Indian Division took Mozzagrogna on the escarpment beyond. A German counter-attack recaptured the village early on 28 November, but a fresh attack by 1st Bn 12th Frontier Force Regiment, accompanied by all the divisional and corps artillery, finally captured it by 01.30 on 29 November. The following night 1st Bn 5th Royal Gurkha Rifles and 1/12th FFR captured the dominating ground beyond Mozzagrogna, completing the rupture of the Bernhardt Line. The division continued to advance with short, powerfully supported attacks against stubborn resistance, where artillery ammunition supply became the limiting factor. Winter weather brought an end to operations in late December.

==== Monte Cassino ====
Eighth Army regrouped during the winter months, and 8th Indian Division moved to XIII Corps for the Spring offensive. This corps would be operating in the Liri Valley as part of the renewed attack on Monte Cassino (Operation Diadem). First XIII Corps carried out a setpiece assault crossing of the Rapido or Gari River (part of the German Gustav line), with an artillery programme starting at 23.00 on 11 May. Every gun was employed for the next 12 hours in counter-battery (CB) and counter-mortar fire, with the field guns concentrating on the German mortars and Nebelwerfers. At 00.45 on 12 May 8th Indian Division launched its assault boats and the field guns switched to providing a Creeping barrage, followed by timed concentrations on selected targets. A dense mist screened the assault points but caused confusion for the attackers and both attacking brigades got left behind by the barrage. Nevertheless, after hard fighting they achieved a bridgehead and before nightfall the Sappers had laid two bridges to allow tanks to cross. Next day 1/5th Gurkha Rifles, supported by tanks and seven field artillery regiments, took the village of San Angelo at the third attempt, and on 14 and 15 May the division cleared the tongue of land between the Liri and the Gari and pressed on westwards as the Germans fell back to the Hitler Line.

The artillery had to be brought up before the next bound, the advance north of the Liri on 25 May, but then its CB fire totally suppressed the German artillery, which fell silent every time an air observation post spotter aircraft appeared. While the armoured divisions advanced up the roads, the lightly equipped 8th Indian Division took to the narrow tracks through the hills, driving German rearguards from the hilltop towns. On the night on 1/2 June the division moved cross-country to Vico nel Lazio, bridging streams and gullies as it went and reaching the town on the afternoon of 3 June. The Germans then pulled back to the Trasimene Line and Fifth US Army entered Rome next day.

For the pursuit to Lake Trasimeno, 8th Indian Division came under X Corps, leading its advance on minor roads through the hill country east of Rome. Perugia was captured without much opposition on 19/20 June, then X Corps struck north up the Tiber valley, with 8th Indian Division making for Sansepolcro. On 26 June it caught an unprepared German division and inflicted heavy casualties. 8th Indian Division had been in almost continuous fighting for nine months, and was now relieved for rest and refit.

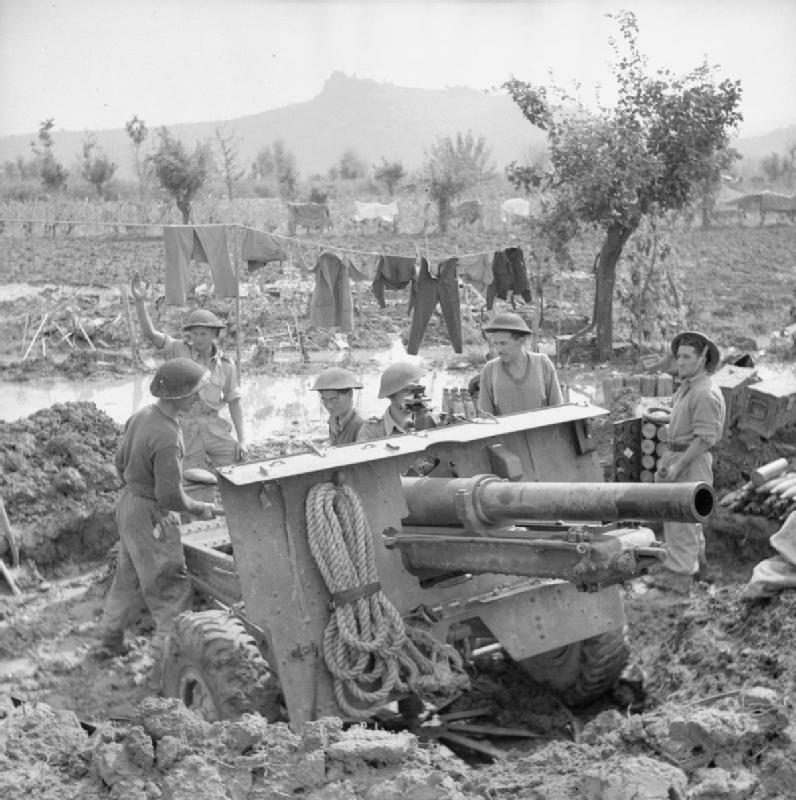
A 25-pounder crew in a waterlogged position in Italy, 1944.

==== Operation Olive ====
8th Indian Division returned to the front line with XIII Corps in the Elsa Valley later in July. The corps employed its overwhelming superiority in artillery to drive towards Florence, which the Germans evacuated. The forces then had to be regrouped to attack the Gothic Line in Operation Olive. 8th Indian Division crossed the River Arno in a preliminary operation on 21 August, and then advanced into the roadless mountains where it could not take its artillery. It captured Monte Femmina Morta on 18 September, easing the advance through the Casaglia Pass. Afterwards it advanced down the Faenza road, opening the routes into the Lamone Valley for heavy equipment and supplies, but further progress through the mountains was slow. The gunners had particular problems in firing over crests to hit targets behind. The division maintained pressure on the German positions during October to prevent them moving troops elsewhere. Artillery ammunition had to be rationed from November, but 8th Indian Divisional Artillery, operating in the critical junction between Eighth Army and Fifth US Army, was exempt and received ample supplies. The division kept up small offensive operations into the winter, despite the supply difficulties in the mountains. On 26 December the Germans launched a counter-attack (the Battle of Garfagnana) between Lucca and Pistoia towards Livorno, but 8th Indian Division had already been rushed west to bolster the US sector concerned. The Germans broke through until they were stopped at the Indians' positions, when 8th Indian Division took over control of the sector, but the German attack was not pressed. The division was relieved for rest on 8 January 1945.

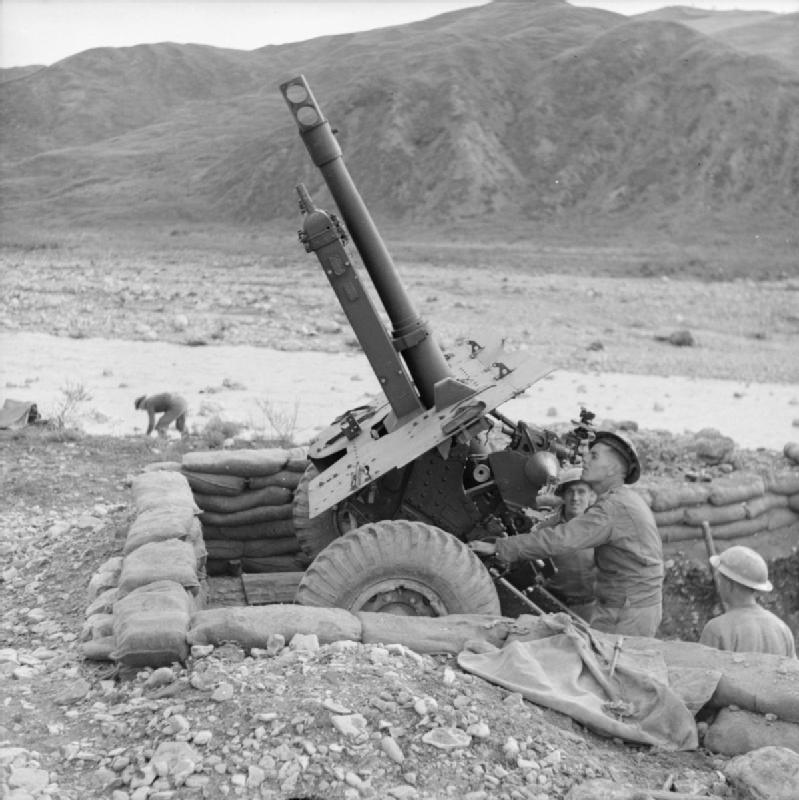
A 25-pounder in a gun pit adapted to gain maximum elevation, Italy 1944.

==== Operation Grapeshot ====
8th Indian Division was back with Eighth Army for the Allies' spring offensive in Italy, Operation Grapeshot. It was given the task of an assault crossing of the River Senio, with massive artillery support added to its own guns, and ample ammunition stocks built up during the winter. The German positions, dug into the floodbank of the river, presented a challenging linear target, so many of the guns fired in enfilade from the flanks. The operation was launched on 9 April. At 15.00 the assault troops withdrew to a safe distance while the artillery and air bombardment was carried out. Then at 19.20 the assault infantry went in, with a protective barrage laid on the far side of the river. Opposition remained strong on 8th Indian Division's front, but after bitter fighting through the night it secured its objectives by midday on 10 April. It then fought its way forward to the River Santerno and secured crossings during the night of 11/12 April. 78th Division then passed through 8th Indian Division to continue the advance. As Eighth Army advanced towards the River Po, 8th Indian Division came back into the widening line, attacking up the Via Adriatica until it ran into opposition at the airfield south-west of Ferrara on 22 April. After a 36-hour fight the division thrust round the western city of the city and got to the Po on 23 April, possibly the first troops of Eighth Army to reach it. The division then planned for another assault crossing, but German resistance was crumbling and opposition to its crossing on the night of 25/26 April was negligible. The division was then 'grounded' as its transport was taken to support Eighth Army's rapid drive to Venice and Trieste.

Hostilities on the Italian Front ended on 2 May with the Surrender of Caserta, but 8th Indian Division had already been withdrawn from the line on 29 April. It had been selected as the first Indian formation to transfer from Italy to the Far East theatre to fight the Japanese. It left in June 1945, when all the British units attached to it reverted to the British establishment and returned home. 52nd Field Rgt and the other units had been overseas for over two years and most of their personnel were due for repatriation under the government's 'Python' scheme. 52nd (Manchester) Fd Rgt embarked for the UK on 27 July and passed into suspended animation on 3 November 1945.

== Postwar ==
The TA was reconstituted on 1 January 1947, when 52nd Fd Rgt was reformed as 252 (Manchester) Fd Rgt in 42nd (Lancashire) Division.

When the TA was reduced in 1961, the regiment absorbed the RHQ and P (Manchester) and R (Stockport) Btys of 314 Heavy Anti-Aircraft Rgt (a merger of several Lancashire regiments, including its own duplicate 110th (Manchester) Fd Rgt), which provided P and R Btys of the new 252 (Manchester) Fd Rgt. (Note: Q (Salford) Bty of 314 HAA Rgt joined 253 (Bolton) Fd Rgt.)

The TA was further reduced into the Territorial and Army Volunteer Reserve (TAVR) on 1967, when the regiment formed Battery HQ and D & E Trps of 209 Light Air Defence Bty (The Manchester Artillery) in 103 (Lancashire Artillery Volunteers) Light AD Rgt. This battery continues in today's Army Reserve, based at Belle Vue Army Reserve Centre in Manchester.

== Insignia ==
From 1947 to 1961 252 (Manchester) Fd Rgt wore a regimental arm badge based on the coat of arms of the City of Manchester, consisting of a red shield bearing three offset gold diagonal stripes (Gules three Bendlets enhanced Or) in an ornate gold outline, surmounted by a Griffin's head, on a blue backing.
