= Charles Wilbraham Watson Ford =

British Indian Army officer (1896–1972)

- Born: 17 July 1896; Staindrop, Durham, England
- Died: 13 October 1972 (aged 76); Battle, Sussex, England
- Military career
- Allegiance: United Kingdom
- Service years: 1914–1947
- Conflicts: World War I; World War II; Anglo-Soviet invasion of Persia

Brigadier Charles Wilbraham Watson Ford (1896–1972) was a senior officer in the British Indian Army during World War II. He was educated at Cheltenham College and the Royal Military College, Sandhurst. He was commissioned a Second Lieutenant and appointed to the Unattached List for appointment to the Indian Army on 16 December 1914. Ford was appointed to the 35th Sikhs on 11 February 1915.

He served in Mesopotamia from 2 October 1916 to 26 January 1918 and from 24 June 1918 to 19 January 1919. He was Mentioned in the Dispatches London Gazette on 27 August 1918.

He served during the Afghanistan, North West Frontier 1919 operations and was wounded.

Ford transferred to the 5th battalion 11th Sikh Regiment on 1 February 1922 and rose to be appointed Lieut-Colonel commanding on 2 May 1938.

He was appointed acting then temporary Colonel from 9 May 1941 to 1 November 1943. He was also appointed acting then temporary Brigadier from 9 May 1941. He was a Brigade commander from 9 May 1941 to 29 July 1942.

As part of Paiforce (formerly Iraqforce), Ford commanded the 19th Indian Infantry Brigade of the Indian 8th Infantry Division during the Anglo-Soviet invasion of Persia.

He was Mentioned in the Dispatches London Gazette on 17 December 1942 for gallant and distinguished services in Waziristan as Lt-Col.

Ford was promoted to colonel on 2 November 1943 with seniority from 2 May 1941.

He retired colonel (honorary brigadier) on 1 September 1947.

He died in Battle, Sussex, on 13 October 1972.

== Command history ==
- 1938–1940: Commanding officer, 5th battalion 11th Sikh regiment, India
- 1941–1942: Commanding officer, 19th Indian Brigade, India and Persia

== See also ==
- Iraqforce
