= Dudley Russell =

British army officer during World Wars 1 and 2

Lieutenant-General Sir Dudley Russell KBE CB DSO MC
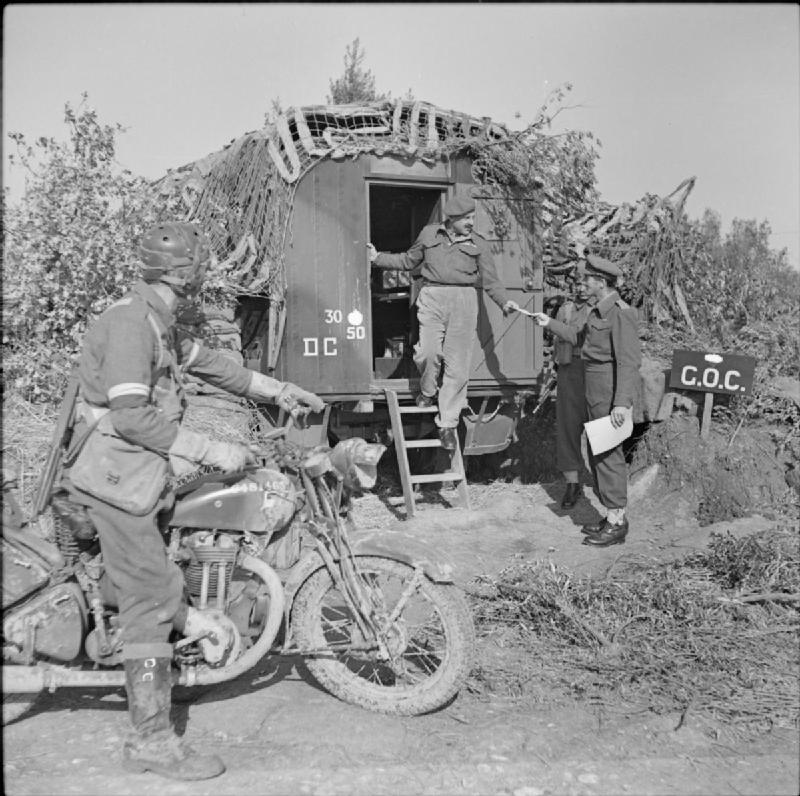
- A motorcycle despatch rider watches as the message he has brought to 8th Indian Division HQ is handed to the GOC, Major-General Dudley Russell, by his ADC, Captain D. A. Sconce, early 1944.
- Born: 1 December 1896; Bexleyheath, Kent, England
- Died: 4 February 1978 (aged 81); Nassau, Bahamas
- Military career
- Allegiance: United Kingdom
- Branch: British Army; British Indian Army
- Service years: 1915–1954
- Rank: Lieutenant-General
- Nickname: "Pasha" (Note: Historian Richard Mead suggests the nickname was because of his huge moustache, which made him look like a Turkish military governor.)
- Service number: 8991
- Units: Queen's Own (Royal West Kent Regiment); 97th Deccan Infantry; 19th Hyderabad Regiment; 13th Frontier Force Rifles
- Commands: 6th Royal Battalion (Scinde), 13th Frontier Force Rifles; 5th Indian Infantry Brigade; 8th Indian Infantry Division; 5th Indian Infantry Division; Delhi and East Punjab Command; Chief British Advisor to the Indian Army
- Conflicts: World War I World War II
- Awards: KBE(1950); CB (5 July 1945); CBE (31 August 1944); OBE (30 December 1941); DSO (9 July 1942); MC (8 March 1919); MID (24 June 1943); MID (19 July 1945); LM (Commander) (31 July 1945)

Lieutenant-General Sir Dudley Russell, KBE, CB, DSO, MC (1 December 1896 – 4 February 1978) was a senior officer of both the British Army and the British Indian Army, and served during World War I and World War II, where he commanded the 8th Indian Infantry Division during the Italian Campaign from late 1943 until the end of the war in 1945.

== Early career ==
Russell received a temporary commission in 1914 and in 1915 joined the 7th (Service) Battalion, Queen's Own (Royal West Kent Regiment) with whom he served during World War I. In October 1917 he transferred to the British Indian Army and in November was commissioned as a lieutenant into the 97th Deccan Infantry serving in Egypt. In March 1919, as an acting captain he was awarded the MC, the citation for which read

In the attack on the Tabsor system of trenches on the 19th September, 1918, he displayed conspicuous gallantry and leadership. His personal example of coolness, the marked skill with which he led his company under very heavy artillery and machine-gun fire, and his initiative in locating the objective, enabled the two attacking companies to capture the position with promptness and very few casualties

Russell's promotion to substantive captain did not come until 1923 but was antedated to June 1919.

In the 1922 reorganisation of the Indian Army his regiment became the 3rd Battalion of the 19th Hyderabad Regiment. During the period between the world wars he attended the Staff College, Quetta. In 1935 he transferred to the 6th Royal (Scinde) battalion 13th Frontier Force Rifles. In 1936 he qualified as a higher standard interpreter in Pashto which resulted in his widely used nickname of "Pasha". He was promoted lieutenant colonel in April 1938 and commanded the 6th Battalion from 1938 to 1940.

== World War II ==
=== East Africa ===
In August 1940 his battalion joined 9th Indian Infantry Brigade, part of the newly formed 5th Indian Infantry Division and was shipped to the Sudan. Here he was appointed the division's GSO1 (senior headquarters staff officer), replacing Frank Messervy who took command of Gazelle Force which was being formed as a mobile strike force to operate against the Italians along the border with Eritrea.

From October 1940 to August 1941 during the East African Campaign Colonel Russell continued in this role performing a key function in the campaign fought by 4th and 5th Indian Infantry Division in Eritrea. He negotiated the surrender of the Italian forces commanded by Amadeo, 3rd Duke of Aosta at Amba Alagi. For his services in East Africa Russell was awarded the OBE.

=== North Africa ===
The 5th Indian Division moved to Cairo in June 1941 and then Iraq in August, returning to Egypt in October more or less coincidental with Russell's promotion to brigadier and assuming command of the 4th Indian Infantry Division's 5th Indian Infantry Brigade, part of XIII Corps in the newly created British Eighth Army.

On 18 November 1941 Eighth Army launched Operation Crusader. Initially Russell's brigade, short of transport, was delegated to protect lines of communication. By 26 November it was moving to the front. By mid December the brigade was involved in intense fighting against the armour of Erwin Rommel's Afrika Korps at Alem Hamsa where the 1st Battalion, Buffs (Royal East Kent Regiment) were destroyed as a fighting unit and were temporarily replaced by 1st Battalion, 6th Rajputana Rifles.

In March 1942 4th Indian Division was dispersed and the brigade was sent to Palestine but hastily summoned back to the western desert after Rommel's breakthrough at the Battle of Gazala. Initially attached to 5th Indian Division, the brigade was transferred to 10th Indian Infantry Division as it withdrew from Libya to the defensive position at Mersa Matruh in Egypt. On 28 June the brigade found its line of withdrawal from Metrsa Matruh cut and was forced to break out southwards into the desert in small parties before turning east and reforming behind the defensive position at El Alamein. For his leadership of the brigade in the period from November 1941 to April 1942 Russell was awarded in September 1942 the DSO.

Having reorganised, the brigade was once more attached to 5th Indian Division and during mid July fought in the battles of Ruweisat Ridge, part of series of engagements now called the First Battle of El Alamein. The brigade continued to hold positions on or near the Ruweisat Ridge up to November and the Second Battle of El Alamein. By this time 5th Indian Division had been relieved and the brigade was once more part of 4th Indian Division. For his services between May and October Russell was mentioned in dispatches.

4th Indian Division's initial role in the second Alamein battle was to make diversionary displays from Ruweisat Ridge while the main offensive went into the north. In early November the 2nd New Zealand Division had made a salient into the Axis lines and 5th Indian Brigade were attached to the exhausted 51st (Highland) Infantry Division to complete the breakthrough. By dawn on 4 November the brigade had secured its objectives opening the way for the British armour.

=== Iraq and Syria ===
In January 1943 Russell was appointed acting major-general and appointed to command 8th Indian Infantry Division in Iraq. When the German defeat at the Battle of Stalingrad removed the threat to Iraq and Persia from the Caucasus the division was moved to Syria for training. In June 1943 the division was ordered to seize the island of Rhodes but the armistice with Italy forestalled the operation.

=== Italy ===
In September 1943 the division landed in Taranto in southern Italy, destined to become engaged for the rest of the war fighting on the Italian Front. For the next three months the division fought up the eastern side of Italy as part of Eighth Army's V Corps, making crossings of the rivers Biferno, Trigno and in late November the Sangro. By mid-December they had crossed the Moro but General Sir Bernard Montgomery, the Eighth Army commander, called off offensive operations as deteriorating winter weather and conditions underfoot made further attacks impractical and 8th Indian Division were tasked to hold the front between Orsogna and the Apennine Mountains.

At the beginning of May 1944, 8th Indian Division had been attached to XIII Corps and switched in secrecy across the Apennines to the mouth of the Liri valley beneath Monte Cassino for the fourth Battle of Monte Cassino, Operation Diadem. 8th Indian and British 4th Division were given the job to get across the fast-flowing Rapido river and establish bridgeheads. The attack went in on the night of 11 May and by 09.00 the next morning Russell's divisional engineers had erected a Bailey bridge to allow supporting armour into the bridgehead to repel German armoured counterattacks. By 13 May the Germans fell back and 1st Canadian Infantry Division passed through the bridgehead to lead the advance. 8th Indian Division now came under X Corps for a 150-mile advance before being rested at the end of June. In August 1944 Russell was awarded the CBE.

After three weeks' rest the division re-joined XIII Corps, which by this time formed the right wing of the U.S. Fifth Army, under Mark Clark, to liberate Florence before moving into the central Apennines and advance north east to confront the Gothic Line. Monte Citerna on the Gothic line was taken on 9 September but this only heralded another two and a half months fighting, making slow progress in poor conditions and wild terrain.

In late 1944, as Eighth Army ground its way forward across the division's front from the right, the Germans withdrew from 8th Indian Division's sector to shorten their front line and lines of communication. In late December Russell was ordered to take two brigades to the far western wing of the Fifth Army where the inexperienced U.S. 92nd Infantry Division was thought by the new Fifth Army commander, Lieutenant General Lucian K. Truscott, to be very vulnerable. On 26 December the Germans broke through towards Russell's rearguard positions but the attack was not carried through and 8th Indian Division recovered the lost ground. The division was then withdrawn to rest at Pisa.

On 8 February Indian Division was moved to the Adriatic front once more to join Eighth Army's V Corps once again and take up positions on the river Senio. The main attack on the Senio started on 9 April 1945. By the evening 8th Indian Division, with the New Zealanders on their left, had in furious fighting against desperate defence created a bridgehead one and a half miles deep. On 11 April they made a strongly opposed crossing of the river Santerno before allowing the British 78th Division to pass through into the Argenta Gap. After a brief pause for rest, during which time 78th Division and British 56th Division had forced the Argenta Gap defences, 8th Indian Division were put back in the front line to take Ferrara and be the first Eighth Army formation to reach the river Po. After crossing the Po the division crossed the river Adige on 28 April and was ordered to halt.

Following the formal cessation of hostilities on 2 May, 8 Indian Division was repatriated to India during June. Russell's temporary rank of major-general was made substantive in November and he was appointed Companion of the Bath (CB). He was also mentioned in despatches and received the United States Legion of Merit, Degree of Commander.

== Post war ==
The 8th Indian Division was disbanded in April 1946 and Russell was appointed to command 5th Indian Division. In 1947 Russell became C-in-C Delhi and East Punjab Command in the acting rank of lieutenant-general before in 1948 becoming Chief Advisor to the Indian Army. He was knighted KBE in the 1950 New Year's honours list at the request of the Indian government and retired in July 1954 retaining the honorary rank of lieutenant-general.

== Personal ==
He married Elizabeth Birket in 1929.

== Honours and decorations ==
Knight Commander of the Order of the British Empire 2 January 1950 (CBE 31 August 1944, OBE, 30 December 1941)
Companion of the Order of the Bath 5 June 1945
Distinguished Service Order 9 September 1942
Military Cross 8 March 1919
Mention in Despatches 24 June 1943, 23 June 1945
Commander, Legion of Merit (United States) 2 August 1945

== Bibliography ==
- Anon (1946). One More River: The Story of The Eighth Indian Division. Bombay: H.W. Smith, Times of India Press.
- Anon (1946). The Tiger Triumphs: The Story of Three Great Divisions in Italy. HMSO.
- Mackenzie, Compton (1951). Eastern Epic. London: Chatto & Windus. OCLC 1412578.
- Mead, Richard (2007). Churchill's Lions: A Biographical Guide to the Key British Generals of World War II. Stroud: Spellmount. ISBN 978-1-86227-431-0.
- Smart, Nick (2005). Biographical Dictionary of British Generals of the Second World War. Barnesley: Pen & Sword. ISBN 1844150496.

Military offices
Preceded by Charles Harvey	GOC 8th Indian Infantry Division; 1943–1946	Succeeded by Post disbanded
Preceded by ??	GOC 5th Indian Infantry Division; 1946–1947	Succeeded by ??
