= Rupert Lochner =

British Indian Army general (1891–1965)

Major-General Rupert Lochner MC DL
- Born: 26 January 1891; Gravesend, Kent, England
- Died: 20 June 1965 (aged 74); Abergavenny, Monmouthshire, Wales
- Military career
- Allegiance: United Kingdom
- Branch: British Army
- Service years: 1910–1946
- Rank: Major-General
- Unit: South Wales Borderers
- Commands: 2nd Indian Infantry Division (1942–43); Basra Area Base (1942); 18th Indian Infantry Brigade (1940–42); 1st Battalion, South Wales Borderers (1938–40)
- Conflicts: First World War; Second World War
- Awards: Military Cross; Mentioned in Despatches (2); Officer of the Legion of Merit (United States)
- Other work: Deputy Lieutenant of Breconshire

Major-General Rupert Gordon Lochner, MC, DL (26 January 1891 – 20 June 1965) was an officer in the British Army.

== Military career ==
Lochner was commissioned into the South Wales Borderers from the Royal Military College, Sandhurst, on 5 October 1910 and saw service during the First World War in France and Belgium from July 1915 to July 1916, and again from January 1917 to November 1918, earning the Military Cross during this time.

Lochner was appointed to command the 1st Battalion, The South Wales Borderers as a lieutenant colonel from 20 February 1938 to 14 October 1940. He was appointed acting brigadier 15 October 1940. As part of Paiforce (formerly Iraqforce), Lochner commanded the 18th Indian Brigade of the 8th Indian Infantry Division during the Anglo-Soviet invasion of Persia.

Lochner relinquished command of the brigade 14 August 1942 and was promoted to acting major general on 15 August 1942 and became the Base Commander Persia and Iraq from 15 August 1942 until 14 September 1942. He was advanced again to temporary major general from 15 August 1943 until 10 December 1943 when he relinquished the rank but he was again appointed temporary major general on 25 October 1944. He was Mentioned in Despatches twice during the war. He retired as a colonel (honorary major general) in January 1946.

== Bibliography ==
- Smart, Nick (2005). Biographical Dictionary of British Generals of the Second World War. Barnesley: Pen & Sword. ISBN 1844150496.
