= Irish Management Institute =

Irish business and management post-graduate school

Coordinates: 53.275265°N 6.231335°W

- Foras Bainistíochta na hÉireann
- Other name: IMI
- Established: 1952
- Affiliations: Business Post (owner) University College Cork (previous owner)
- CEO: Shane O’Sullivan
- Location: Dublin, Ireland
- Campus: Urban
- Website: www.imi.ie

The Irish Management Institute (IMI) is an educational institute in Dublin, Ireland that offers postgraduate diplomas, executive education programs, and short courses in Business and Management. In its role as a membership organisation it connects businesses around its mission of improving the practice of management in Ireland.

Founded in 1952 and for decades an autonomous organisation, in 2011 an alliance between University College Cork and the institute e was announced in June 2011 by Taoiseach Enda Kenny, the two institutions having been collaborating since 2009. As of 2014, the majority of the degrees offered by the IMI were accredited by UCC. In 2016, after many years of discussion, UCC bought the IMI and its lands. Publishing group the Business Post acquired IMI from UCC in 2025.

== History ==
The idea for the institute originated from a committee set up by Michael Dargan, T.P. Hogan and other businessmen. The motivation was to establish an organisation that would further the science and practice of business management in Ireland. Those involved were inspired primarily by the American Management Association and The Conference Board. At the same time the then Minister for Industry and Commerce, Seán Lemass had prompted a separate group of leading semi-state and private bosses into investigating a similar idea. Both groups merged and the inaugural meeting of the Irish Management Institute was held on 9 December 1952 in the Gresham Hotel. The founding chairman was Sir Charles Harvey.

The objective of the institute was to raise the standard of management in Ireland. Originally it did this through corporate and personal memberships, regular lectures and conferences, a journal called Irish Management, research and the establishment of a members library. After its first decade the institute became involved in management training courses.

Part of IMI's original brief had been to encourage the universities to develop management education. In the early 1960s both UCD and Trinity College introduced master's degrees in management. This was an indication of management's growing stature as an academic discipline. In turn IMI created the Sir Charles Harvey Award for exceptional graduates of these courses. The first recipient was Patrick J. Murphy. IMI later went on to become a provider of education. Its popular Certificate in Supervisory Management (CISM) was the first academic course run by IMI and was the institute's first progression into all-island distance learning. In 1973 IMI partnered with Trinity for the MSc (Management). The MSc epitomised IMI's teaching philosophy and is notable for being the first management degree in the world to be based on action learning. Related courses followed over the next three decades. Other affiliations with Irish universities have included a Masters in information technology development with NUI Galway and a research alliance with the University of Limerick. In 2003 IMI launched their support and delivery of the Flexible Executive Henley MBA programme. In 2011 the institute began an alliance with UCC. UCC now accredits IMI's diploma and degree courses.

UCC controversially bought the IMI and the IMI was merged into UCC.

In 2025, the Business Post acquired IMI from UCC. While IMI has been incorporated into the Business Post's other holdings, UCC continues ownership of the IMI campus.

== Board and Council ==
IMI is owned by the Business Post. Its council acts an advisory body for IMI management and is elected from a group of senior executives from member organisations. Council members serve as ambassadors for IMI within Irish industry and are the electoral college for IMI's board of directors. The board is responsible for IMI's strategy and planning. The CEO (formerly the director general) is in charge of managing the institute.

== Campus ==
The institute was originally headquartered upstairs in 81 Grafton Street. As its activities increased it required greater space prompting further moves to 79 Merrion Square in 1954, 12 Leeson Park in 1956, Errigal on the Orwell Road in Rathgar in 1963 and, finally, the purpose-built, 13-acre (53,000 m2) National Management Centre in Sandyford, which opened on 25 September 1974. Around the time of sale the secluded site was considered a prospective location by Soviet Russia for its embassy in Ireland.

The architect Arthur Gibney was awarded with the RIAI Gold Medal 1974-1976 for the building, which took design inspiration from the system of step terraces used in the Oakland museum of California. The site was developed to incorporate existing natural features, its distinctive trees and small hills, as well as Clonard, a mid-nineteenth century house. A sculpture by Michael Warren called Dolmen was erected in 2000. A residential block and conference centre were later added, for which Arthur Gibney & Partners won the RIAI Best Commercial Building Award in 2005.
