= Robert Wordsworth =

Australian military general and politician

Major-General Robert Wordsworth CB CBE
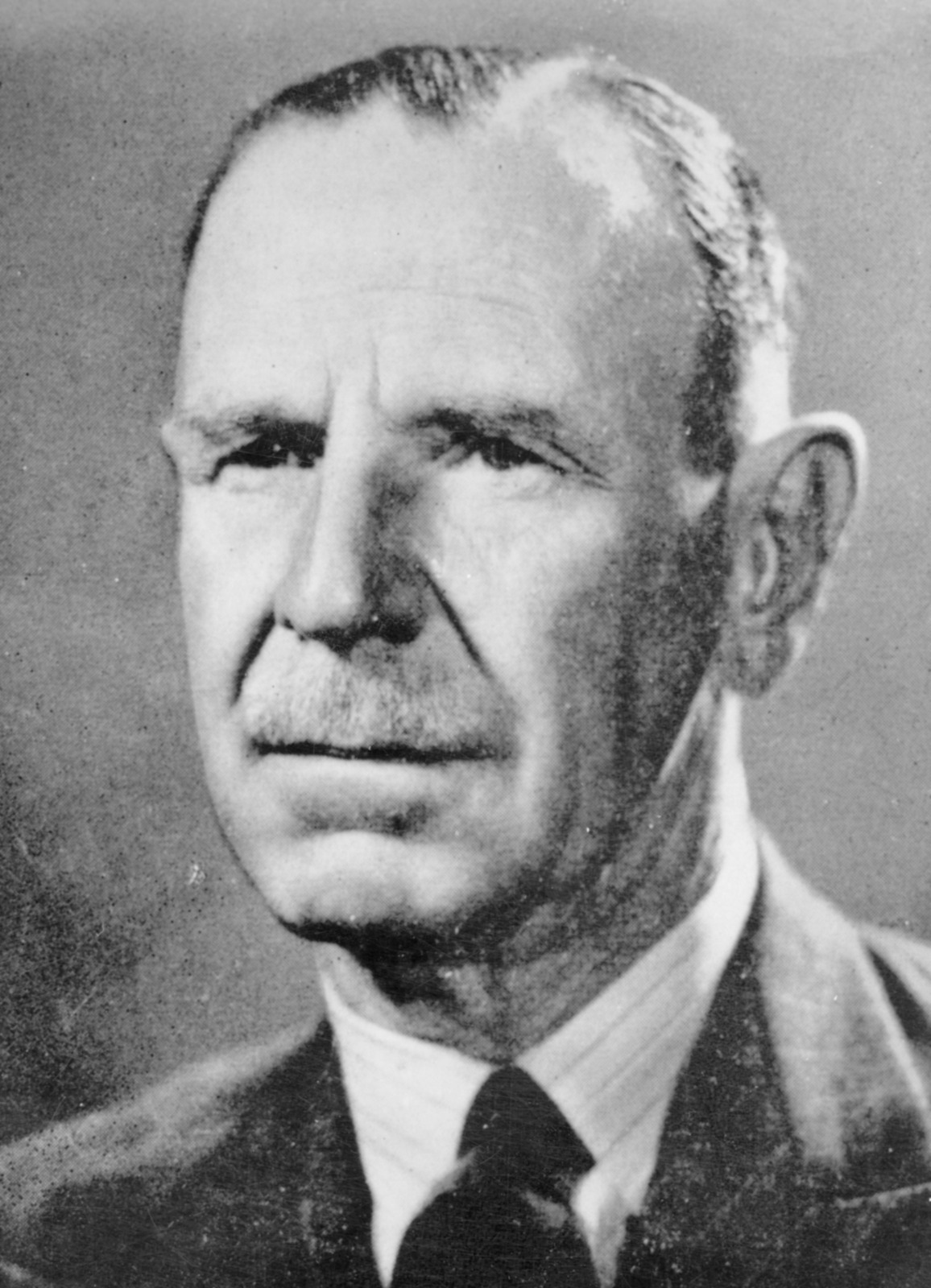

Senator for Tasmania
- In office 22 February 1950 – 30 June 1959

Personal details
- Born: 21 July 1894 Collarenebri, New South Wales, Australia
- Died: 22 November 1984 (aged 90) Longford, Tasmania, Australia
- Party: Liberal
- Spouse: Margaret Ross-Reynolds (m. 1928)
- Relations: David Wordsworth (son)
- Awards: Companion of the Order of the Bath; Commander of the Order of the British Empire

Military service
- Allegiance: United Kingdom
- Branch/service: British Indian Army
- Years of service: 1914–1947
- Rank: Major-General
- Battles/wars: World War I World War II

Major-General Robert Hurley Wordsworth CB CBE (21 July 1894 – 22 November 1984) was an Australian military officer and politician. He served with the Australian Army during World War I before transferring to the British Indian Army in 1917. He commanded units in India and Persia during World War II before returning to Australia in 1947. He subsequently served as a Senator for Tasmania from 1950 to 1959, representing the Liberal Party, and as administrator of Norfolk Island from 1962 to 1964.

== Early life ==
Wordsworth was born on 21 July 1894 in Collarenebri, New South Wales. He was the son of Robena (née Walker) and William Henry Wordsworth; his father was a storekeeper who later farmed on a pastoral property near Cowra. He attended Sydney Church of England Grammar School from 1908 to 1910, where he was an army cadet.

== Military career ==
Wordsworth was commissioned into the Australian Imperial Force on 27 August 1914 as an officer of 1st Light Horse Regiment.

During World War I Wordsworth served at Gallipoli, Egypt and Palestine between May 1915 and November 1917 and was mentioned in dispatches.

After transferring to the Indian Army on 3 November 1917, he was appointed to the 16th Cavalry on 7 November 1917. He went on to serve in Waziristan between 1919 and 1921 with his regiment which was amalgamated with the 13th Duke of Connaught's Lancers in June 1921 to form the 13/16th Cavalry which itself was renamed the 6th Duke of Connaught's Own Lancers in July 1922.

Wordsworth served as Adjutant and later became a Squadron Commander within the regiment throughout the North West Frontier operations from 1930 to 1931. He was appointed commanding officer of the 6th Duke of Connaught's Own Lancers on 11 June 1939.

Wordsworth also served in World War II. In July 1940 he was appointed commander of the 1st Indian Armoured Brigade, which was renamed 251st Indian Armoured Brigade in October 1941, as part of 1st Indian Armoured Division, later renamed 31st Indian Armoured Division. Promoted Acting Major-General on 28 March 1942, he was appointed commander of the 31st Indian Armoured Division in May 1942. As part of the British 10th Army, his division was stationed in Persia in 1942. At that time, the British 10th Army was part of Paiforce (formerly Iraqforce) under the Persia and Iraq Command.

In December 1944 he was appointed Director of Armoured Fighting Vehicles, India. He was made a Commander of the Order of the British Empire in 1943, promoted to major-general on 6 June 1944 and appointed a Companion of the Order of the Bath in 1945.

== Politics ==
In 1947, after retiring from the Indian Army, Wordsworth settled in Tasmania, his wife's birthplace, farming on the Meander River near Westbury. He joined the Liberal Party and first stood for parliament the following year, running unsuccessfully in the seat of Wilmot at the 1948 state election.

Wordsworth was elected to the Senate at the 1949 federal election. His first term was cut short by a double dissolution, but he was re-elected to a three-year term at the 1951 election and to a six-year term at the 1953 election. He was defeated at the 1958 election with his term concluding on 30 June 1959.

In the Senate, Wordsworth was primarily interested in foreign affairs and defence. He served on the Joint Standing Committee on Foreign Affairs from 1952 to 1959. He was an anti-communist and supported increase defence expenditure, Australian participation in regional defence alliances such as ANZUS and SEATO, and the British nuclear tests at Maralinga. In his memoirs he recalled that he had not enjoyed his time in parliament as he thought it did not suit former soldiers and disliked "uninformed criticism, particularly in debate".

After his defeat, Wordsworth served as state president of the Tasmanian Liberals from 1960 to 1962. He was appointed administrator of Norfolk Island, an Australian external territory, in June 1962. He remained in the post until August 1964.

== Personal life ==
In 1928, Wordsworth married Margaret Ross-Reynolds, with whom he had two children. His son, David Wordsworth, was a member of the Western Australian Legislative Council.

Wordsworth retired to Tasmania, living in Launceston and later settling in Longford. He died at Longford on 23 November 1984, aged 90.

== Bibliography ==
- Smart, Nick (2005). Biographical Dictionary of British Generals of the Second World War. Barnesley: Pen & Sword. ISBN 1844150496.
