= Bill Leggatt =

English cricketer and British Army officer

- Born: 2 September 1900; Crail, Fife, Scotland
- Died: 13 August 1946 (aged 45); Westminster, London
- Relatives: Hester Leggatt (sister)
- Military career
- Allegiance: United Kingdom
- Branch: British Army
- Service years: 1919–1946
- Rank: Lieutenant colonel
- Unit: Royal Artillery
- Commands: 16th Field Brigade RA; 11th (HAC) Field Regiment RHA; 83rd Anti-Tank Regiment RA; 3rd Reserve Regiment RA
- Conflicts: Second Battle of El Alamein; North African Campaign
- Awards: Distinguished Service Order

Lieutenant colonel William Murray Leggatt DSO (2 September 1900 – 13 August 1946) was an English officer in the British Army and amateur cricketer who played in 11 first-class cricket matches between 1926 and 1933. He served in the Royal Artillery, commanding Royal Artillery regiments during the North African campaign in World War II.

== Early life ==
Leggatt was born at Crail in Fife in 1900, the son of Ernest and Jesse Leggatt. His father served in the Indian Civil Service. His sister Hester Leggatt later worked for MI5.

Legatt was educated at Parkside Prep School and Winchester College. He was an "excellent athlete" at school, played in the cricket, rugby union and football teams at Winchester and was described as "the most effective bowler" in the school team in his final year. He was considered a particularly good Winchester College footballer at school and played soccer as a full back or centre-half - he was described as "a very cool player" and a "really big man" in 1920 whilst playing for an Army team.

== Army career ==
On leaving school Leggatt joined the Royal Military Academy, Woolwich, where he captained the academy cricket and football teams and played rackets, before he was commissioned into the Royal Artillery (RA). He served in British India for a time and as an instructor at Woolwich between 1931 and 1935. He was promoted to the rank of captain in 1933, served as adjutant of 16th Field Brigade RA from 1935 and was promoted to Brigade Major in 1938, serving in Egypt until the start of World War II.

During the war, Leggatt attended the Middle East Staff School in Haifa and went on to command 11th Regiment, Royal Horse Artillery (Honourable Artillery Company). He was mentioned in dispatches twice and awarded the Distinguished Service Order after commanding the regiment at the Second Battle of El Alamein in 1942. He moved to command 83rd Anti-Tank Regiment in August 1943. During 1944 Leggatt was promoted to the rank of lieutenant colonel before returning to Britain in May 1944 due to poor health, commanding the 3rd Royal Artillery Reserve Regiment.

== Cricket career ==
Bill Leggatt
Cricket information
- Batting: Right-handed
- Bowling: Right-arm fast

Domestic team information
- Years: Team
- 1926: Kent
- 1926–1933: Army
- FC debut: 3 July 1926 Kent v Yorkshire
- Last FC: 26 August 1933 Army v West Indians

Career statistics
| Competition | First-class |
|---|---|
| Matches | 11 |
| Runs scored | 479 |
| Batting average | 29.93 |
| 100s/50s | 0/3 |
| Top score | 92 |
| Catches/stumpings | 9/– |
- Source: Cricinfo, 18 February 2019

Leggatt played cricket regularly for the Royal Artillery Cricket Club during the early years of his service career, before making his first-class cricket debut in July 1926 for Kent County Cricket Club at Blackheath in a County Championship match against Yorkshire. He made a total of five appearances for Kent, all in 1926, and made his first-class debut for the British Army cricket team in the same season, playing against the Royal Navy at Lord's.

When he was stationed in Britain, Leggatt played regularly for the Army team. He captained the team between 1930 and 1934 and made a total of six first-class appearances for the Army.

In total Leggatt made 11 first-class appearances, playing only as a batsman despite his schoolboy billing as a bowler. He scored three half-centuries with a highest score of 92 runs made in his second first-class match for Kent against Gloucestershire, a match The Times described as "Mr Leggatt's Match" in its headline. He could drive the ball powerfully and was described as "a batsman who may become very good indeed" by The Times in 1924. He played "with great power on the off-side", having a "good defence" and making good scores for teams throughout this club career.

== Personal life and death ==
Leggatt married Connel Auld Mathieson in July 1929. The couple lived at Hinton St George in Somerset and had one son and three daughters.

Leggatt's sister Hester was a British MI5 employee in the department responsible for managing Double Cross agents; Hester was involved in the management of Operation Mincemeat during the Second World War, and may have been the author of the false love letters which were famously used during the deception mission.

After returning from overseas service Leggatt was considered to be suffering poor health as a result of his war service and was ordered to take a years sick leave in April 1945. He died of a heart attack at the Cavalry Club in Piccadilly, London in August 1946 aged 45. He is buried at Hinton St George and is one of three Kent cricketers who died during World War II who are not named on the Blythe Memorial at the St Lawrence Ground in Canterbury.
