= James Scott-Elliot =

British Army general

Major-General James Scott-Elliot CB CBE DSO*
- Born: 6 November 1902; Charlton, London, England
- Died: 12 September 1996 (aged 93)
- Relatives: George Scott-Elliot (uncle)
- Military career
- Allegiance: United Kingdom
- Branch: British Army
- Service years: 1923–1956
- Rank: Major-General
- Service number: 23799
- Units: King's Own Scottish Borderers; Argyll and Sutherland Highlanders
- Commands: 51st (Highland) Infantry Division (1952–1956); 13th Infantry Brigade (1946–1947); 167th Infantry Brigade (1944–1946); 17th Indian Infantry Brigade (1943–1944); 8th Battalion, Argyll and Sutherland Highlanders (1943); 6th Battalion, Argyll and Sutherland Highlanders (1942–1943)
- Conflicts: Second World War: Battle of France; Tunisian campaign; Italian campaign
- Awards: Companion of the Order of the Bath; Commander of the Order of the British Empire; Distinguished Service Order & Bar

Major-General James Scott-Elliot, CB, CBE, DSO & Bar (6 November 1902 – 12 September 1996) was a senior British Army officer.

== Military career ==
Educated at Wellington College, Berkshire, and the Royal Military College, Sandhurst, Scott-Elliot was commissioned into the King's Own Scottish Borderers on 1 February 1923. He transferred to the Argyll and Sutherland Highlanders in 1935 and attended the Staff College, Camberley from 1937 to 1938. After this, he served as a General Staff Officer Grade 3 (GSO3) with Scottish Command.

Scott-Elliot was deployed to France with the British Expeditionary Force (BEF) at the start of the Second World War as a brigade major with the 51st (Highland) Division's 154th Infantry Brigade. After being evacuated from France in June 1940, he became commanding officer of the 6th Battalion, Argyll and Sutherland Highlanders in April 1942 and landed with his battalion in North Africa after Operation Torch in December 1942. He went on to serve as commander of the 17th Indian Infantry Brigade and then as commander of the 167th (1st London) Brigade in Italy during the Italian campaign. His brigade was the first unit to cross the River Po on the route north through Italy.

After the war, Scott-Elliot commanded the 13th Infantry Brigade during most of 1947 before becoming Deputy Director of Military Training at the War Office in 1948, Deputy Commander of the 51st (Highland) Division in 1950 and then General Officer Commanding the 51st (Highland) Division in November 1952. He retired from the army in March 1956.

Scott-Elliot served as colonel of the King's Own Scottish Borderers from 1954 to 1961, and as Lord Lieutenant of Dumfries from 1962 to 1967.

Scott-Elliot was appointed an Officer of the Order of the British Empire for distinguished services in the field in October 1940, and promoted to Commander of the Order (CBE) for gallant and distinguished services in Italy in 1945. He was awarded the Distinguished Service Order in November 1943 and a bar in February 1944, He was appointed a Companion of the Order of the Bath (CB) in the 1954 New Year Honours.

== Other interests ==
Scott-Elliot became President of the Dumfries & Galloway Natural History and Antiquarian Society, as well as President of the Society of Antiquaries of Scotland between 1962 and 1967. He was also well known for his interest in dowsing. He was the president of the British Society of Dowsers and in 1977 he wrote a book on the topic, "Dowsing: One Man's Way."

== Family ==
In 1932 Scott-Elliot married Cecil Margaret Du Buisson; they had one son and two daughters. After being divorced from his first wife, he married Fay Courtauld in 1971.

== Works ==
- Scott-Elliot, James (1977). Dowsing: One Man's Way. The Book Service. ISBN 978-0859780254.

Military offices
Preceded by Keith Arbuthnott	GOC 51st (Highland) Infantry Division; 1952–1956	Succeeded by Edward Colville
Honorary titles
Preceded by Eric Miles	Colonel of the King's Own Scottish Borderers; 1954–1961	Succeeded by Sir William Turner
Preceded by Sir John Crabbe	Lord Lieutenant of Dumfries; 1962–1967	Succeeded by Sir Arthur Duncan
