= 8th Infantry Division (India) =

Indian Army unit

8th Indian Infantry Division 8th Mountain Division
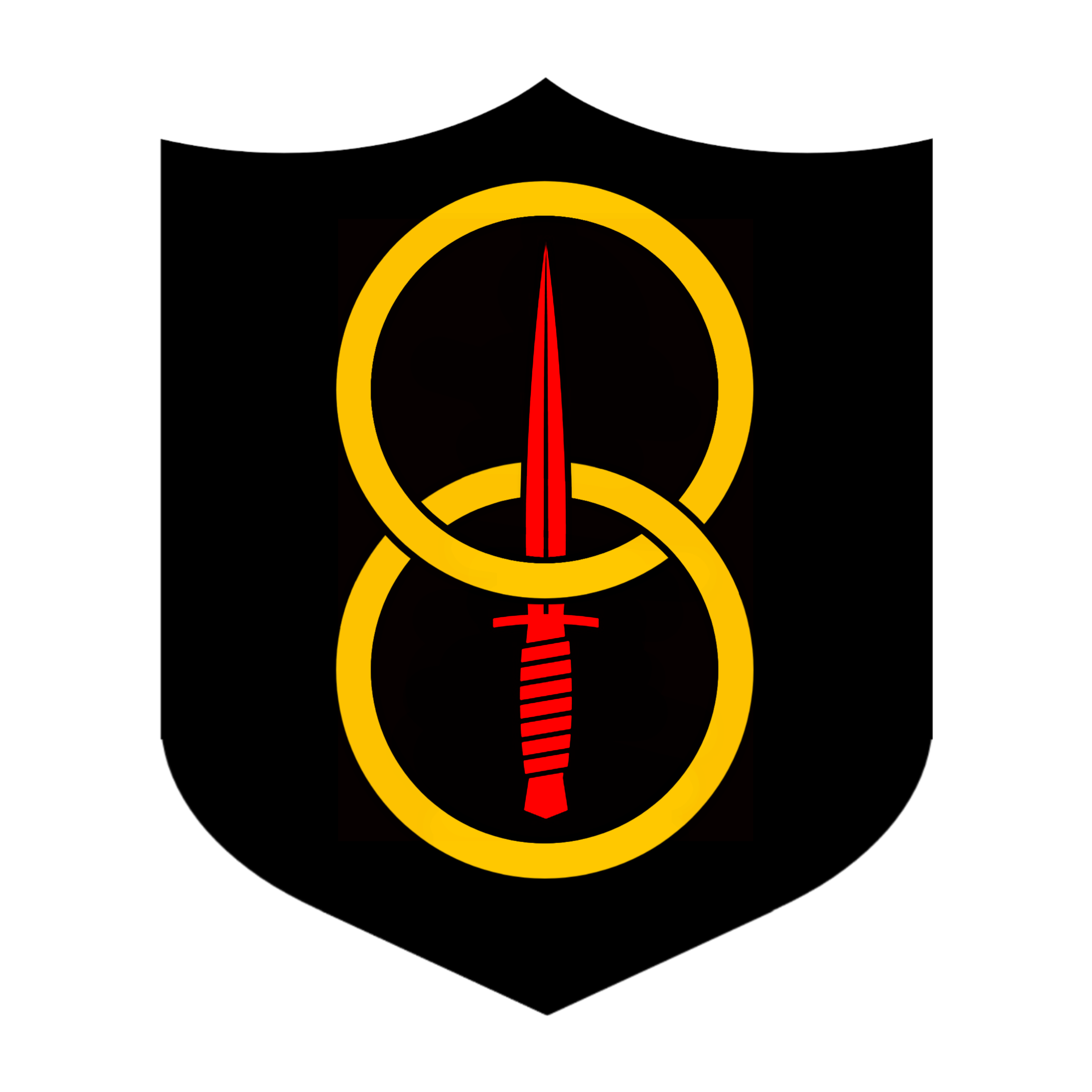
- Divisional badge
- Active: 1940–1946; 1963–present
- Country: (British Raj) British India; India
- Allegiance: India
- Branch: British Indian Army; Indian Army
- Type: Mountain Infantry
- Size: Division
- Garrison/HQ: Khumbathang
- Nickname: The Clovers
- Engagements: Iraq 1941; Syria 1941; Persia 1941; Italy 1943–1945; Bangladesh 1971; Battle of Sylhet; Kargil conflict 1999
- Battle honours: North Africa; Italy

Commanders
- Current commander: Major General Sachin Malik
- Notable commanders: Lt General Dudley Russell; General K. V. Krishna Rao; General Ved Prakash Malik; General Dalbir Singh Suhag; General Manoj Pande

The 8th Mountain Division is a division of the present-day Indian Army that specialises in mountain warfare.

It was initially raised as the 8th Indian Infantry Division, an infantry division, in Meerut on 25 October 1940 under Major-General Charles Harvey, a British Indian Army officer, as part of the Indian Army during World War II. It served in the Middle East in the garrisoning of Iraq and then the invasion of Persia to secure the oil fields of the area for the Allies. A brigade was detached to the Western Desert to reinforce the British Eighth Army as it withdrew before the Axis forces. Following training in the Near East, the division entered the Italian Campaign, landing at Taranto in mainland Italy.

The division was disbanded at the end of World War II in 1946, but re-formed again in 1963 as a specialist mountain division of the Indian Army.

== History ==
Despite its relatively late introduction into the mainstream of battle, its members won nearly 600 awards and honours including 4 Victoria Crosses, 26 DSOs and 149 MCs. During the war the 8th Indian Division sustained casualties totalling 2,012 dead, 8,189 wounded and 749 missing.

=== Iraq, Syria and Iran ===
When originally formed, the division's main fighting formations were the 17th, 18th and 19th Indian Infantry Brigades.

On 9 June 1941, 17th Brigade arrived in Basra and joined Iraqforce, which had fought the Anglo-Iraqi War to secure the British-owned oilfields during May. These oilfields were perceived to be threatened when a coup d'état brought into power Rashid Ali al-Kaylani who was sympathetic to the Axis powers. By the second half of June the brigade had moved to Mosul to defend British-owned oilfields from an anticipated thrust by Axis forces south through the Caucasus.

At the end of 1 June, 1/12th Frontier Force Regiment and 5/13th Frontier Force Rifles were detached from 17th Brigade to join two battalions from the 20th Indian Infantry Brigade (part of the 10th Indian Infantry Division) to take part in the Syria-Lebanon campaign and capture the Duck's Bill area in north east Syria and secure the Mosul to Aleppo railway. This was achieved without a shot being fired as the Vichy French forces retired westwards.

On 17 July, Major-General Charles Harvey and the divisional HQ arrived in Basra and had the 24th Indian Infantry Brigade (which arrived on 16 June) assigned to the division. The 18th Indian Infantry Brigade arrived in Iraq on 26 July. The British, having secured first the Iraqi oilfields and then Syria, now focused their concern on Persia (now Iran) where it was estimated there were some 3,000 German nationals working as technicians, commercial agents and advisors. The division first saw shots fired in anger during the Anglo-Soviet invasion of Iran in August 1941 when the 24th Brigade made a night-time amphibious assault across the Shatt al Arab to capture the oil refinery at Abadan in South Persia. Meanwhile, 18th Brigade had crossed into Persia between Basra and Abadan to take Khorramshahr and became part of a three brigade advance (with Hazelforce) towards Ahwaz, 75 miles north east of Basra. The fighting ended on 28 August when the Shah ordered his forces to cease hostilities.

The 19th Indian Infantry Brigade arrived in Iraq in August, replacing the 24th Brigade (which transferred to the 6th Indian Infantry Division), and by 17 October, 18th and 19th Brigades had concentrated at Kirkuk in northern Iraq and moved north of the oilfields where they were joined by the 6th Duke of Connaught's Own Lancers (Watson's Horse) (6th DCO Lancers), the division's reconnaissance regiment.

=== North Africa ===
In June 1942 the 18th Brigade, having been rushed over to North Africa from Mosul, and with only two days to prepare defensive positions, was overrun by Erwin Rommel's tanks at Deir el Shein in front of the Ruweisat Ridge. In the process, however, they gained valuable time for the British Eighth Army to organise the defences for what was to be the First Battle of El Alamein, halting Rommel's advance towards Egypt. The brigade was never re-formed.

=== Iraq and Syria ===
From August 1942 the division, still a brigade short, became part of Paiforce when Persia and Iraq became a separate command under General Sir Henry Maitland Wilson in Baghdad, Lieutenant-General Edward Quinan's Tenth Army in Iraq and Persia having previously come under Middle East Command in Cairo. As the threat from the north faded following the Axis defeats at Alamein and Stalingrad, the division withdrew in October 1942 to Kifri near Baghdad where it was joined by the 21st Indian Infantry Brigade and the 3rd, 52nd and 53rd Field Regiments of the Royal Artillery. It spent the winter in intensive training.

In January 1943 command of the 8th Indian Division passed to Major-General Dudley Russell (The Pasha), promoted after 15 months commanding the 5th Indian Infantry Brigade, part of the excellent "Red Eagles" 4th Indian Infantry Division. The 8th Indian Division moved in March 1943 to Damascus and continued to spend much of its time training, notably in mountain warfare and combined operations.

In June 1943 the division was selected to participate in the anticipated Dodecanese Campaign ("Operation Accolade"), and seize the Italian-occupied island of Rhodes, the chief Axis stronghold in the Dodecanese Islands. After frantic preparation and having loaded the first wave of ships, the division's participation was canceled when the Italian government surrendered and it was redirected to Italy which the German Army had continued to occupy.

=== Italy ===
On 24 September 1943 the 8th Indian Division landed in Taranto, to take part in the Italian Campaign. The division landed 21 days after the initial invasion, as part of V Corps, commanded by Lieutenant-General Charles Allfrey, serving alongside the British 4th Armoured Brigade and the British 78th Infantry Division. For 19 months the division was almost continuously in action, advancing through mountainous country, crossing river after river. The formation later adopted the motto "One more river".

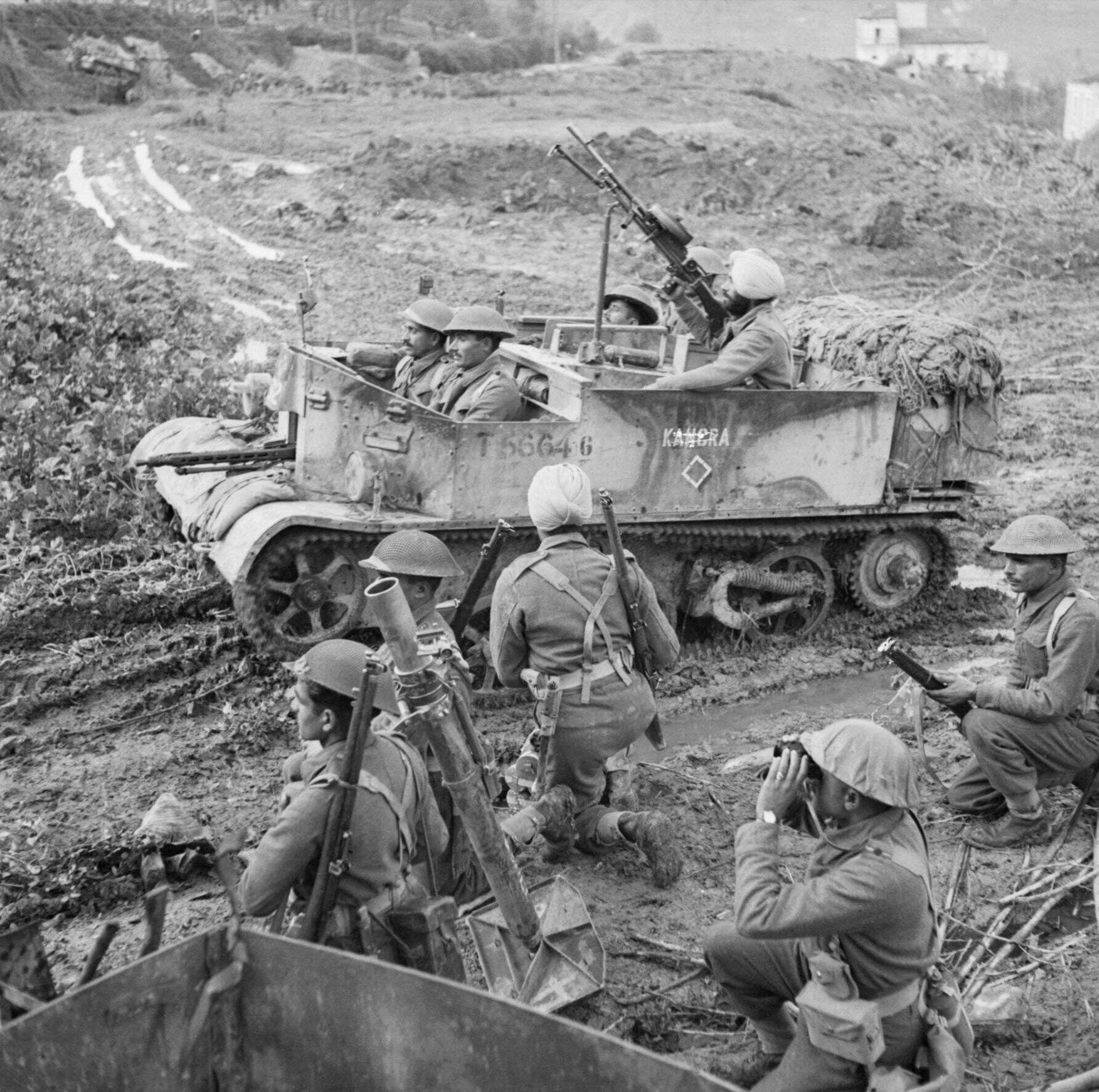
Universal Carrier and mortar team of the 6th Battalion, 13th Frontier Force Rifles, between Lanciano and Osogna on the central sector of the Eighth Army's front, 13 December 1943.

From October 1943 to April 1944 the 8th Indian Division was part of the Allied thrust by the British Eighth Army, under General Sir Bernard Law Montgomery, up the Adriatic front on the Eastern side of Italy. This involved opposed river crossings of the Biferno, Trigno (October 1943), Sangro (November 1943) and Moro (December 1943). The following three months proved almost as arduous for, although there was no formal offensive, the period was characterised by patrolling and vicious skirmishes in very difficult terrain and abominable winter weather, which proved to be extremely demanding, both physically and mentally, and very stressful.

==== Cassino ====
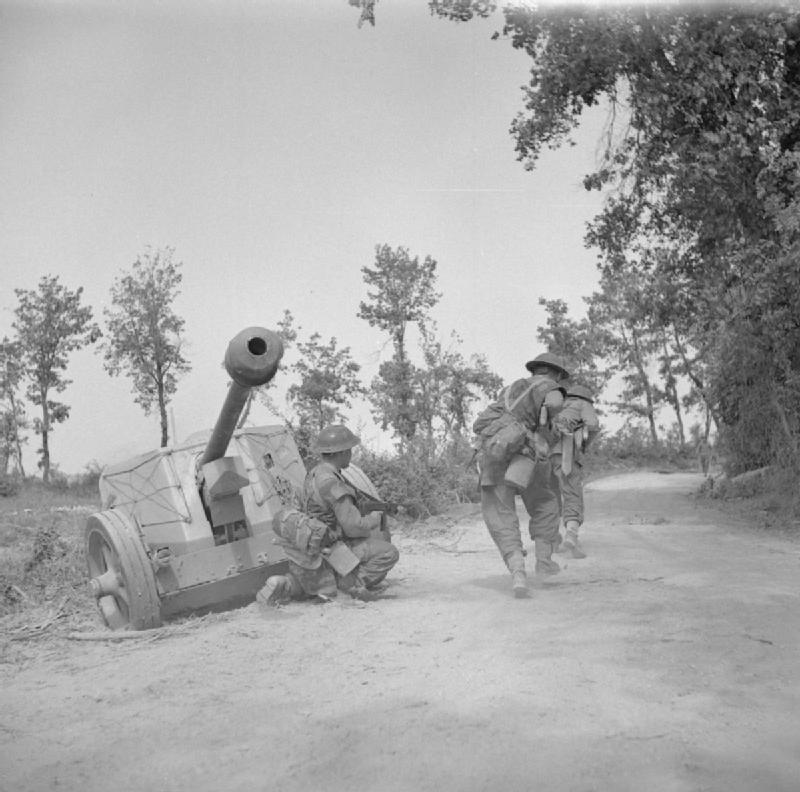
Men of 'A' Company of the 5th Battalion, Queen's Own Royal West Kent Regiment advance along a road past an abandoned German 75mm anti-tank gun in the Rapido bridgehead, Italy, 16 May 1944.

When the spring came the 8th Indian Division was switched in great secrecy (along with the bulk of the British Eighth Army, now commanded by Lieutenant-General Sir Oliver Leese) 60 miles west across the Apennine Mountains to concentrate as part of Lieutenant-General Sidney C. Kirkmans' British XIII Corps, serving alongside the British 4th and 78th Infantry Division, 6th Armoured Divisions, as well as the 1st Canadian Armoured Brigade, along the River Garigliano at a part of the river better known as the Gari. Their heavily opposed night crossing of the Gari in May 1944, supported by Canadian tanks (1st Canadian Armoured Brigade) with which the division had formed a particularly close fighting relationship over the previous six months, was critical to the Allies' success in this, the fourth and final Battle of Monte Cassino. Following this, the division advanced some 240 miles in June across mountainous country, fighting many actions against rearguards and defended strongpoints. In late June they had reached Assisi and the division was rested. It was during the fighting on the Gari that Kamal Ram of the 3rd Battalion, 8th Punjab Regiment was awarded his Victoria Cross. At 19 years of age, he was one of the youngest recipients of the VC during the Second World War.

==== Florence and the Gothic Line ====
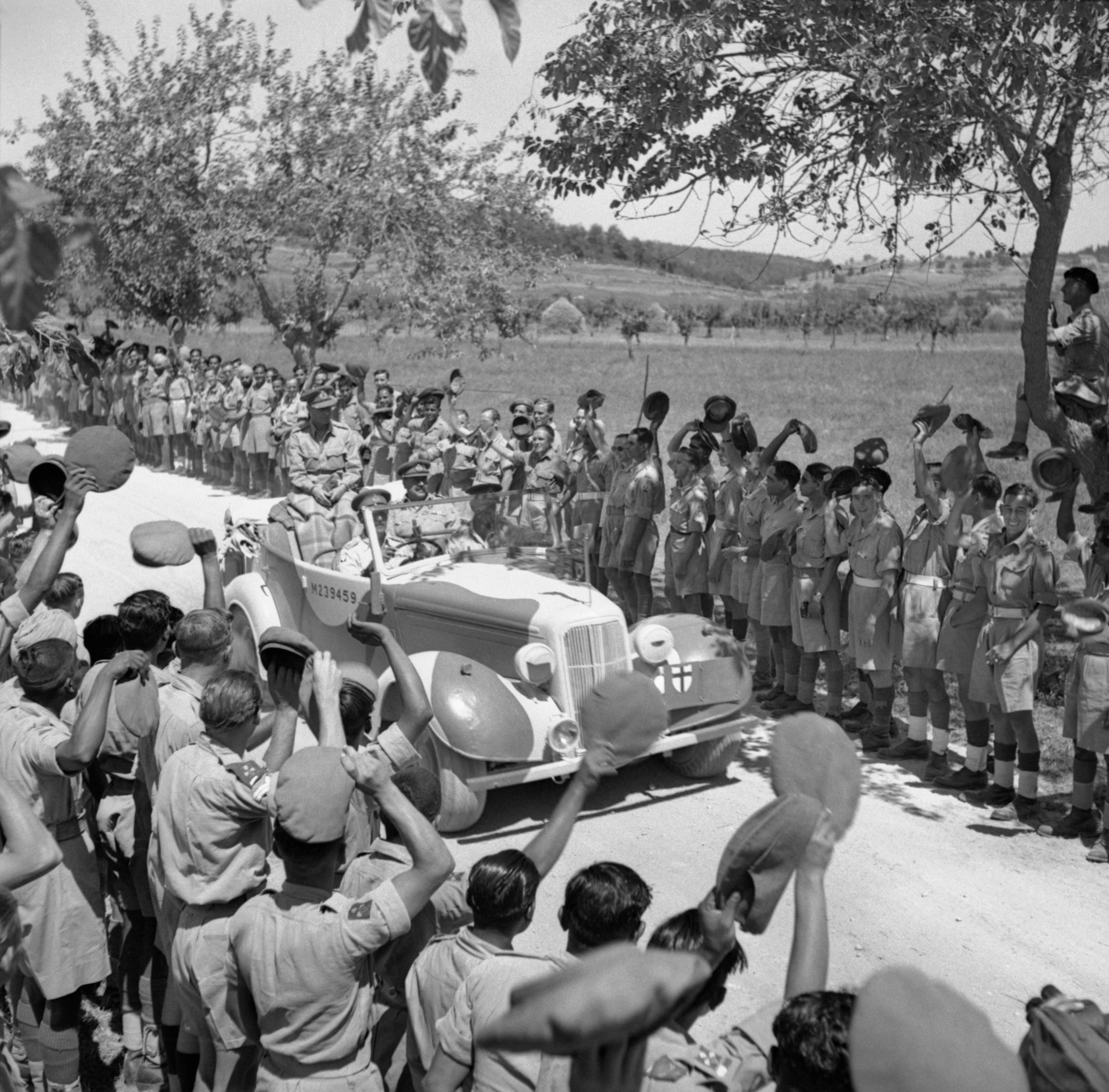
King George VI is driven past cheering Indian troops on his way to a ceremony to invest Sepoy Kamal Ram with the Victoria Cross, Italy, 26 July 1944.

By the end of July 1944, after a few weeks out of the line, the 8th Indian Division was back in the line with 1st Canadian Armoured Brigade in front of Florence pushing towards the River Arno. Florence was occupied by the 21st Indian Infantry Brigade on 12 August where they had the unusual task to recover some of the world's greatest art treasures and arrange safe custody. By mid-September the division was in the mountains again, breaking through the Gothic Line and then spending two months of grim (and ultimately unsuccessful) battling in foul weather towards the plains of Northern Italy, together with the British 1st Infantry, 78th Infantry and 6th Armoured Divisions, alongside the 1st Canadian Armoured Brigade, forming British XIII Corps. XIII Corps had now become the right wing of the U.S. Fifth Army, commanded by Lieutenant General Mark W. Clark. It was during this time when Thaman Gurung of the 1st Battalion, 5th Royal Gurkha Rifles was awarded the Victoria Cross.

In December 1944 the 2nd New Zealand Division, advancing from the Adriatic on the division's right along the Romagna plain, took Faenza and the resistance on the 8th Indian Division's front weakened as the Germans withdrew to shorten their front. In late December 1944, the 19th and 21st Brigades were rapidly switched across the Apennines to reinforce the U.S. 92nd Infantry Division on the Fifth Army's left flank in front of Lucca. By the time they had arrived the Germans had broken through but decisive action by Major-General Russell halted their advance and the situation was stabilised by the New Year. The 8th Indian Division then moved to Pisa for a period of rest.

==== Spring offensive 1945 ====
In mid-February 1945 the division was back in the line on the Adriatic front, this time as part of British Eighth Army's V Corps, in front of the River Senio. The main assault on the Senio started on 9 April. In desperate fighting two members of the division, Namdeo Jadav and Ali Haidar, were awarded the Victoria Cross. By 11 April the division reached and crossed the River Santerno breaking open a hole in the German line for the British 78th Division and elements of British 56th Division to engage the enemy and defeat them in the Argenta Gap. This opened the way to Ferrara and the Po River and for the British 6th Armoured Division to pass through, veer left and race westward across country to link with the advancing U.S. Fifth Army, now commanded by Lucian Truscott, and complete the encirclement of the divisions of the German 10th and 14th Armies defending Bologna. In the aftermath of the Argenta fighting, the 8th Indian Division drove on rapidly through to Ferrara and across the Po and shortly thereafter to their last river crossing of the war, the Adige.

The campaign ended on 2 May 1945. The 6th DCO Lancers marked the occasion with a special mission, sending an officer and nine men far up the road towards Austria and arranged the surrender of 11,000 men of their old enemy, the German 1st Parachute Division.

== Order of battle during World War II ==
General Officer Commanding:

- Major-General Charles Harvey (Oct 1940 – Dec 1942)
- Major-General Dudley Russell (Jan 1943 – Aug 1945)
- Brigadier T. S. Dobree (acting) (18 Feb – 11 March 1945)
- Brigadier T. S. Dobree (acting) (3–18 Jun 1945)

=== Headquarters ===
- 6th Duke of Connaught's Own Lancers (Watson's Horse) (Div Reconnaissance Reg)
- Royal Artillery
- Divisional artillery:

Brigadier R. V. M. Garry (Oct 1940 – Sep 1942)
Brigadier M. W. Dewing (Sep 1942 – Sep 1944)
Brigadier F. C. Bull (Sep 1944 – Jul 1945)
Brigadier T. S. Dobree (Jul 1945 – Aug 1945)

  - HQ
  - 3 Field Regt, RA
  - 52 (Manchester) Field Regt, RA
  - 53 (Bolton) Field Regt, RA
  - 26 Light Anti-Aircraft Regt RA
  - 4 Mahratta Anti-Tank Regt
- Indian Engineers: Sappers & Miners
  - 7, 66, 69 Field Coys. King George V's Own Bengal Sappers and Miners
  - 43 Field Park Coy. King George V's Own Bengal Sappers and Miners
- 8 Indian Div Signals
- 5th Royal Battalion Machine Gun 5th Mahratta Light Infantry

=== 17th Indian Infantry Brigade ===
Commanders:

- Brigadier John Geoffrey Bruce (Nov 1940 – May 1941)
- Brigadier Douglas Gracey (May 1941 – Mar 1942)
- Brigadier F. A. M. B. Jenkins (Mar 1942 – Oct 1943)
- Brigadier H. L. Wyndham (Oct 1943 – Nov 1943)
- Brigadier J. Scott-Elliot (Nov 1943 – Jan 1944)
- Brigadier Charles Boucher (Feb 1944 – Jan 1945)
- Brigadier P. R. Macnamara (Jan 1945 – Aug 1945)
  - HQ
  - 1st Battalion, Royal Fusiliers
  - 1st Battalion, 12th Frontier Force Regiment
  - 1st Battalion, 5th Royal Gurkha Rifles (Frontier Force)
  - 1st Battalion, Jaipur Infantry, Indian States Forces (Nov 1944 to Apr 1945)

=== 18th Indian Infantry Brigade (up to June 1942) ===
Commanders:

- Brigadier Rupert Lochner (Oct 1940 – Aug 1942)
  - HQ
  - 2/5th Battalion, Essex Regiment (from Dec 1941)
  - 4th Battalion, 11th Sikh Regiment (from Apr 1942)
  - 2nd Battalion, 3rd Queen Alexandra's Own Gurkha Rifles
  - 1st Battalion, 2nd King Edward VII's Own Gurkha Rifles (until Apr 1942)
  - 3rd Battalion, 10th Baluch Regiment (until Oct 1941)

=== 19th Indian Infantry Brigade ===
Commanders:

- Brigadier C. W. W. Ford (Oct 1940 – Feb 1943)
- Brigadier T. S. Dobree (Feb 1943 – Jul 1945)
- Brigadier W. Sandison (Jul 1945 – Aug 1945)
  - HQ
  - 1/5th Battalion, Essex Regiment (up to March 1944)
  - 1st Battalion, Argyll and Sutherland Highlanders (from Feb 1944)
  - 3rd Battalion, 8th Punjab Regiment
  - 6th Battalion, 13th Frontier Force Rifles

=== 21st Indian Infantry Brigade (from October 1942) ===
Commanders:

- Brigadier C. J. Weld (Sep 1940 – May 1942)
- Brigadier J. J. Purves (May 1942 – Mar 1943)
- Brigadier B. S. Mould (Mar 1943 – Aug 1945)
  - HQ
  - 5th Battalion, Queen's Own Royal West Kent Regiment (Nov 1942 to Jun 1945)
  - 1st Battalion, 5th Mahratta Light Infantry (from Nov 1942)
  - 3rd Battalion, 15th Punjab Regiment (from Apr 1943)
  - 1st Battalion, Jaipur Infantry, Indian State Forces (from Apr 1945)
  - 2nd Battalion, 8th Gurkha Rifles (Jun 1942 to Jan 1943)

=== Support units ===
- Royal Indian Army Service Corps
  - 8 Ind Div Troops Tpt Coy
  - 17, 19 & 21 Brigade Tpt Coys
  - Div Supply Units
- Medical Services
  - I.M.S-R.A.M.C-I.M.D-I.H.C-I.A.M.C
  - 29, 31, and 33 Indian Field Ambulances
- 8 Indian Div Provost Unit
- Indian Army Ordnance Corps
  - 8 Indian Div Ordnance FD Park
- Indian Electrical & Mechanical Engineers
  - 120, 121 & 122 Infantry Workshop Coys
  - 8 Indian Div Recovery Coy

== Assigned brigades ==
All these brigades were assigned or attached to the division at some time during World War II:

- 24th Indian Infantry Brigade
- 25th Indian Infantry Brigade
- 2nd British Parachute Brigade
- 1st Canadian Armoured Brigade
- 12th British Infantry Brigade
- 21st British Army Tank Brigade
- Palestine Infantry Brigade/Jewish Brigade

== Re-raising post-Independence ==
The division was re-raised on 01 August 1963 at Ranchi with Major General KP Candeth as the first General Officer Commanding (GOC). The division differs from more conventional infantry divisions in the emphasis that is placed on infantry tactics and the limited role that armour can be expected to take in operations in mountainous terrain. The armour that is used may differ from that used by other infantry divisions, for example, specialised mountain guns are required in many areas where the division might be expected to operate.

The division has been constantly involved in operations since its creation, earning the sobriquet Forever in Operations. It was initially created for operations against insurgents fighting for a separate state of Nagaland and headquartered at Zakhama (near Kohima). As part of Operation Orchid, it was deployed in the hills of Nagaland, Manipur, Mizoram and Arunachal Pradesh for counter insurgency operations.

== Indo-Pakistani War of 1971 ==
The division took part in the liberation of East Pakistan, (now Bangladesh) in the North Eastern Sector. The division was commanded by Major General K. V. Krishna Rao. The order of battle for the division was as follows:

8 Mountain Division (Major General K. V. Krishna Rao)

- 5 ad hoc Independent Armoured Squadron
- 84 BSF
- 85 BSF
- 93 BSF
- 104 BSF

59 Mountain Brigade (Brigadier C. A. Quinn)

- 9 Guards
- 6 Rajput
- 4/5 Gorkha Rifles
- 1 East Bengal Regiment

81 Mountain Brigade (Brigadier Raja C. V. Apte)

- 3 Punjab
- 4 Kumaon
- 10 Mahar
- 8 East Bengal Regiment
- 99 Mountain Regiment

Echo Sector (Brigadier M. B. Wadke)

- 5/5 Gorkha Rifles
- 86 BSF
- 3 East Bengal Regiment

BSF Sector (Brigadier Kulwant Singh)

- 87 BSF

During the Bangladesh Liberation War and the Indo-Pakistani War of 1971, which began on 3 December 1971, the division was tasked with advancing along the Dharmanagar–Kulaura–Maulvi Bazar axis, securing Shamshernagar Airport and Maulvi Bazar before advancing towards Sylhet. The Sylhet area, surrounded on three sides by Indian territory, was defended by the Pakistani Army's 202nd and 313th Infantry Brigades of the 14th Infantry Division. The operational tasks assigned to the various formations were as follows:

- 59 Mountain Brigade – Dharmanagar–Sylhet axis
- 81 Mountain Brigade – capture Shamshernagar and Maulvi Bazar and advance towards Sylhet
- Echo Sector – Jaintiapur–Sylhet axis
- BSF Sector – Karimganj–Charkai axis

On 2 December 1971, the 81 Mountain Brigade secured the Shamshernagar complex following resistance from Pakistani forces. On the same day, the 59 Mountain Brigade reached Kulaura, which was captured on 6 December. The 81 Mountain Brigade continued its advance and secured Munshi Bazaar by 5 December. Meanwhile, the 4/5 Gorkha Rifles was airlifted by Mi-8 helicopters to an area southeast of Sylhet.

On 9 December, the 81 Mountain Brigade entered Maulvi Bazar and secured the ferry crossings at Saidpur and Sherpur. After completing its assigned objectives, the brigade was withdrawn to Agartala airfield as a corps reserve. The 59 Mountain Brigade continued its advance towards Sylhet and captured Fenchuganj on 11 December. The 5/5 Gorkha Rifles captured Chandghat, contributing to the encirclement of Sylhet from the north-east.

From 13 December 1971, Pakistani forces in the Sylhet area were surrounded from multiple directions. Following the surrender of Pakistani forces in East Pakistan on 16 December, the Pakistani garrison in Sylhet surrendered on 17 December.

Echo Sector captured Jaintiapur but was delayed at Sarighat on 7 December after the bridge there was destroyed. By 10 December, the sector had advanced to Hemu, which was captured that night. It subsequently captured Chandighat on 12 December and Khadim Nagar on 15 December.

== Relocation ==
The formation was moved to the state of Jammu and Kashmir in March 1990 in response to conflict there. It was concentrated in the Kashmir valley and tasked for counter insurgency operations. It was put under the Northern Command and also served as its reserve division. In addition to counter insurgency operations (Operation Rakshak), the division helped in the conduct of the 1996 parliamentary elections in Srinagar and Baramulla districts. Prior to the Kargil War, the division had the following brigades:

- 56 Mountain Brigade at Wusan in Ganderbal district
- 192 Mountain Brigade in the northern parts of the valley, including Sopore
- 81 Mountain Brigade
- 8 Mountain Artillery Brigade in Tangmarg
- 11 Sector Rashtriya Rifles in southern Kashmir

== Kargil War (Operation Vijay) ==
The 8th was shifted on 1 June 1999 to XV Corps for the Kargil conflict, taking over vacant positions formerly held by the 28th Mountain Division. The division under command of Major General Mohinder Puri moved north to take over the Dras-Mushkoh sector in the Kargil District. It augmented the beleaguered 3rd Infantry Division, which was based in Leh. The soldiers had to face the twin challenges of being moved to a high altitude environment and a frigid climate, without the benefit of acclimatization and adequate winter supplies. Following initial reversals, units from the division went on to dislodge the Pakistani infiltrators and recapture Indian territory by using the strategy of preliminary artillery bombardment, followed by climbing near-vertical cliffs during night time in high altitude, multi-directional attacks with overwhelming force and close combat. Prominent battles fought by the division during the war include Battle of Tololing, Battle of Point 5140, Battle of Black Rock, Battle of Point 4700, Battle of Tiger Hill, Battle of Point 4875 (Gun Hill) and the capture of Twin Bumps.

The brigades under the division during the Kargil war were as follows. (The full order of battle (ORBAT) can be found here- Kargil order of battle)

- 56 Mountain Brigade (Brigadier Amar Aul)
- 192 Mountain Brigade (Brigadier M. P. S. Bajwa)
- 8 Mountain Artillery Brigade (Brigadier Lakhwinder Singh)

Additional brigades under the division-

- 50 Parachute Brigade
- 79 Mountain Brigade (XV Corps reserve) (Brigadier RK Kakkar)
- 121 (Independent) Infantry Brigade (Brigadier O. P. Nandrajog)

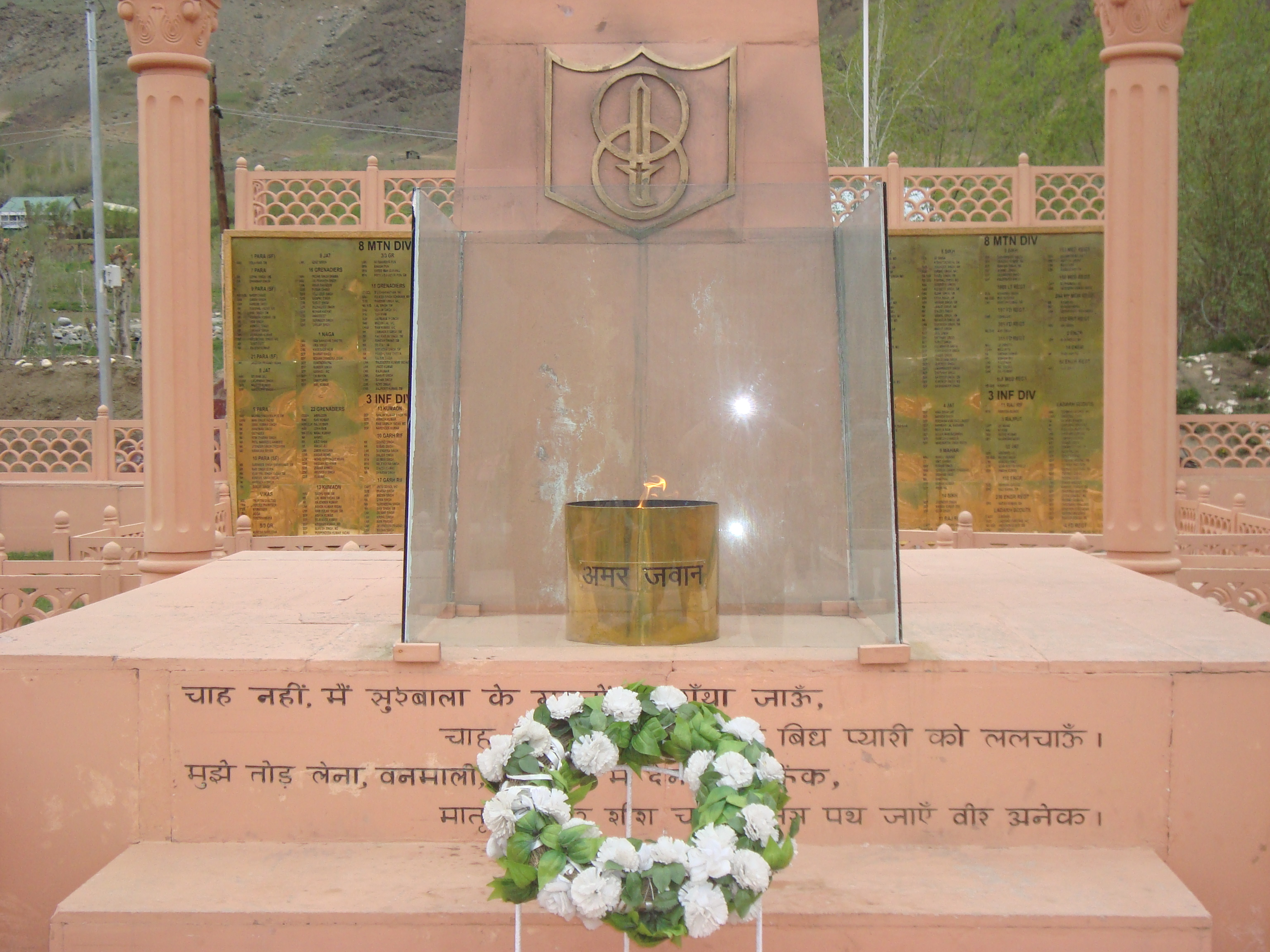
Kargil War Memorial at Dras with the division's 'formation sign'

The division won the bulk of the gallantry awards during the Kargil war. Prominent among them include:

Param Vir Chakra

- Captain Vikram Batra, 13 Jammu and Kashmir Rifles
- Rifleman Sanjay Kumar, 13 Jammu and Kashmir Rifles
- Grenadier Yogendra Singh Yadav, 18 Grenadiers

Maha Vir Chakra

- Major Rajesh Singh Adhikari, 18 Grenadiers
- Major Vivek Gupta, 2 Rajputana Rifles
- Major Padmapani Acharya, 2 Rajputana Rifles
- Captain Anuj Nayyar, 17 Jat
- Captain Neikezhakuo Kenguruse, 2 Rajputana Rifles
- Lieutenant Balwan Singh, 18 Grenadiers
- Naik Digendra Kumar, 2 Rajputana Rifles
- Naik Imliakum Ao, 2 Naga

== The present ==
The division is headquartered at Khumbathang, Ladakh and is now part of XIV Corps. It is tasked to look after the Line of Control in the Kargil sector.

== Badge ==
During World War II the insignia of the division was a yellow four-leafed clover (some versions appear as three-leafed -see images) flanked on each side by a yellow three-leafed clover, their stalks forming a "V", all on a red background. The division and its members were thus referred to as "clovers".

During the period the Scotsmen of the 1st Battalion, Argyll and Sutherland Highlanders served in the division, in the 19th Indian Infantry Brigade, the Jock soldiers fondly referred to the division insignia as "the three wee floo'ers" (the three little flowers).

In its second incarnation, the formation sign of the division depicts a red dagger superimposed on two overlapping gold circles on a black background.

== See also ==
- Operation Sabine (1941)
