= 18th Indian Infantry Brigade =

- Active: 1939–1943
- Country: (British Raj) British India
- Allegiance: British Empire
- Branch: British Indian Army
- Type: Infantry
- Size: Brigade
- Engagements: Anglo-Soviet invasion of Iran; North African Campaign

The 18th Indian Infantry Brigade was an infantry brigade formation of the Indian Army during World War II. It was formed in October 1940 at Meerut in India and assigned to the 8th Indian Infantry Division. It was then detached for independent duties in Abadan in Persia. In late June 1942 the 18th Brigade, having been rushed over to North Africa from Mosul, Iraq, was posted to defend a position with only two to four days to prepare. They were overrun by Erwin Rommel's tanks at Deir el Shein in front of the Ruweisat Ridge on 1 July 1942. In the process, however, they gained valuable time for the rest of the British Eighth Army to organise the defences for what was to be known as the First Battle of El Alamein, halting Rommel's advance towards Egypt.

The remnants of the Brigade were then sent to the 5th Indian Infantry Division and the 18th Brigade was officially disbanded in August 1942.

== Formation ==
- 2nd Battalion, 3rd Gurkha Rifles October 1940 to July 1942
- 3rd Battalion, 10th Baluch Regiment October 1940 to October 1941
- 1st Battalion, 2nd Gurkha Rifles November 1940 to April 1942
- 2/5th Battalion, Essex Regiment December 1941 to July 1942
- 4th Battalion, 11th Sikh Regiment April to July 1942
- 2nd Battalion, 11th Sikh Regiment August 1942

== See also ==
- List of Indian Army Brigades in World War II
