= Charles Harvey (Indian Army officer) =

British Indian Army general (1888–1969)

Sir Charles Harvey CB CVO CBE MC*
- Major-General Charles Harvey in 1945
- Born: 16 July 1888; Eastbourne, Sussex, England
- Died: 11 October 1969 (aged 81)
- Military career
- Allegiance: United Kingdom
- Branch: British Army; British Indian Army
- Service years: 1908–1946
- Rank: Major-General
- Service number: 40167
- Units: Highland Light Infantry; Central India Horse
- Commands: Central India Horse (1933–1936); Wana Brigade (1939–1940); 8th Indian Infantry Division (1940–1942)
- Conflicts: World War I; World War II; Anglo-Soviet invasion of Persia
- Awards: Knight Bachelor; Companion of the Order of the Bath; Commander of the Royal Victorian Order; Commander of the Order of the British Empire; Military Cross & Bar

Major-General Sir Charles Offley Harvey CB CVO CBE MC* (16 July 1888 – 11 October 1969) was an officer in the British Indian Army during World War I and World War II.

He was appointed CVO in 1922 for performing the duties of Assistant Military Secretary to the Prince of Wales (future Edward VIII) during His Royal Highness's Indian Tour in 1921-1922.

In the Anglo-Soviet invasion of Persia in 1941, he commanded 8th Indian Infantry Division, part of PAI Force (Persian & Iraq Force).

He was knighted in 1946 for his services as Military Adviser in Chief to the Indian State Forces.

He was assistant managing director of the Guinness Brewery with responsibility for personnel 1946-1961 and the founding chairman of the Irish Management Institute 1952-1956. He is commemorated in the IMI's Sir Charles Harvey Awards, conferred on leading MBA graduates in Irish universities.

== Army career ==
- Commissioned 1908
- 38th King George's Own Central India Horse 1909
- Commanding Officer Central India Horse (1933–1936)
- General Staff Officer 1 Meerut District, India (1936–1939)
- Commanding Officer Wana Brigade, Waziristan, India (1939–1940)
- General Officer Commanding 8th Indian Infantry Division (1940–1942)
- Military Adviser in Chief Indian States Forces (1943–1946)
- Retired 1946

== Business career ==
He was assistant managing director of the Guinness Brewery with responsibility for personnel from 1946-1961 and the founding chairman of the Irish Management Institute from 1952-1956. He is commemorated in the IMI's Sir Charles Harvey Awards, conferred on leading MBA graduates in Irish universities.^{[2]}

== Bibliography ==
- Duffy, Martin (2012) The Trade Union Pint: The Unlikely Union of Guinness and the Larkins. Dublin: Liberties Press. ISBN 9781907593468
- Anon (1946). One More River: The Story of The Eighth Indian Division. Bombay: H.W. Smith, Times of India Press.
- MacKenzie, Compton (1951). Eastern Epic. Chatto & Windus, London. pp. 623 pages.
- "Orders of Battle.com". Archived from the original on 17 July 2007.
- Smart, Nick (2005). Biographical Dictionary of British Generals of the Second World War. Barnesley: Pen & Sword. ISBN 1844150496.
