= 17th Indian Infantry Brigade =

- Active: 1939–1945
- Country: (British Raj) British India
- Allegiance: British Empire
- Branch: British Indian Army
- Type: Infantry
- Size: Brigade
- Engagements: Anglo-Iraqi War; Syria-Lebanon Campaign; Anglo-Soviet invasion of Iran; North African campaign Italian campaign

Commanders
- Notable commanders: Sir Douglas Gracey

The 17th Indian Infantry Brigade was an infantry brigade formation of the Indian Army during World War II.

== History ==
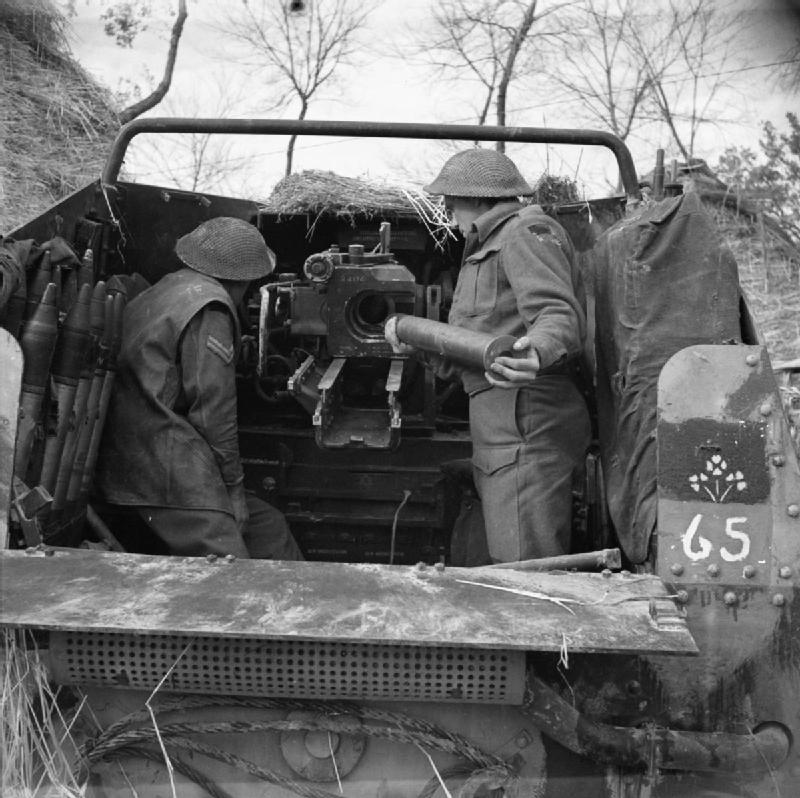
Men of the 1st Battalion, Royal Fusiliers operate a captured German Marder 75mm self-propelled gun, 30 December 1943.

It was formed in November 1940, at the Delhi Cantonment in India and assigned to the 8th Indian Infantry Division. They were sent to participate in the Anglo-Iraqi War and the Syria-Lebanon Campaign and came under command of the 10th Indian Infantry Division between July and August 1941. Returning to the 8th Indian Division in September 1941, at the end of the Anglo-Soviet invasion of Iran, they were sent to Egypt. They then spent 1942, as a garrison force in Syria. It then took part in the Italian Campaign from September 1943 to August 1945. It was briefly coming under command of the British 78th Infantry Division between 3 and 7 November 1943.

== Units ==
- 1st Battalion, 5th Royal Gurkha Rifles (Frontier Force) November 1940 to July 1941 and October 1941 to August 1945
- 1st Battalion, 12th Frontier Force Regiment May 1941 to June 1945
- 32nd Field Regiment, Royal Artillery July 1941
- 1st Battalion, King's Own Royal Regiment (Lancaster) July to December 1941
- 1st Battalion, Royal Fusiliers December 1941 to June 1945
- 144th Field Regiment, Royal Artillery July to August 1942
- 50th Royal Tank Regiment November 1943
- 52nd Field Regiment, Royal Artillery November 1943
- 166th Field Regiment, Royal Artillery November 1943
- 11th Canadian Armoured Regiment April to May 1944 and August 1944
- 6th Battalion, 13th Frontier Force Rifles June 1944
- 4th Anti Tank Regiment, Indian Artillery August 1944
- 6th Duke of Connaught's Own Lancers August 1944
- 5th Battalion, 5th Mahratta Light Infantry August 1944
- 1st Battalion, Jaipur Infantry December 1944 to April 1945

== Commanders ==
- Brigadier John Geoffrey Bruce (Nov 1940 – May 1941)
- Brigadier Douglas Gracey (May 1941 – Mar 1942)
- Brigadier F.A.M.B. Jenkins (Mar 1942 – Oct 1943)
- Brigadier H.L. Wyndham (Oct 1943 – Nov 1943)
- Brigadier James Scott-Elliot (Nov 1943 – Jan 1944)
- Brigadier Charles Hamilton Boucher (Feb 1944 – Jan 1945)
- Brigadier Playford Rawdon Macnamara (Jan 1945 – Aug 1945)

== See also ==
- List of Indian Army Brigades in World War II
