= 19th Indian Infantry Brigade =

- Active: 1939–1945
- Country: (British Raj) British India
- Allegiance: British Empire
- Branch: British Indian Army
- Type: Infantry
- Size: Brigade
- Part of: 8th Indian Infantry Division
- Engagements: Anglo-Soviet invasion of Iran; Italian Campaign

The 19th Indian Infantry Brigade was an infantry brigade formation of the Indian Army during World War II. It was formed on 1 October 1940 at Old Delhi in India and assigned to the 8th Indian Infantry Division. In August 1941, they took part in the Anglo-Soviet invasion of Iran. In September 1943, they moved to the Italian Front, coming briefly under command of the 2nd New Zealand Division in November 1943 and the British 1st Infantry Division in December 1943. Apart from those two attachments the brigade remained with the 8th Indian Division for the remainder of the war.

== Formation ==
- 3rd Battalion, 8th Punjab Regiment October 1940 to August 1945
- 1st Battalion, 1st Punjab Regiment December 1940 to November 1941
- 2nd Battalion, 6th Gurkha Rifles November 1940 to July 1942
- 1st Battalion, Essex Regiment December 1941 to May 1943
- 6th Battalion, 13th Frontier Force Rifles May to November 1942 and February 1943 to August 1945
- 5th Battalion, Essex Regiment May 1943 to March 1944
- 19th New Zealand Armoured Regiment November 1943
- 1st Battalion, Argyll and Sutherland Highlanders February 1944 to June 1945
- 1st Battalion, Jaipur Regiment September to October 1944

== See also ==
- List of Indian Army Brigades in World War II
