= East African campaign (World War II) order of battle =

The Order of battle of the East African campaign shows the ground forces of both sides in East Africa on the date that the Italians declared war on Britain and France, 10 June 1940 and for the British and Commonwealth forces involved in the 1941 offensive.

== Comando Forze Armate dell'Africa Orientale Italiana ==
Commander-in-Chief, Italian East African Armed Forces Command, Amedeo, 3rd Duke of Aosta

=== Northern Sector ===
- Northern Sector, in Asmara – Lieutenant-General Luigi Frusci

==== Eritrea Troops Command ====
- Eritrea Troops Command, in Asmara – Major-General Vincenzo Tessitore
  - V Colonial Brigade, in Kerora – Brigadier-General Angelo Bergonzi
    - XCVII Colonial Battalion
    - CV Colonial Battalion
    - CVI Colonial Battalion
    - V Colonial Artillery Group (65/17 field guns)
    - 5th Colonial Cavalry Squadron
    - 5th Mixed Colonial Engineer Company
    - 5th Colonial Field Hospital
    - 5th Colonial Supply Column
  - VIII Colonial Brigade, in Teseney – Colonel Antonio Rizzo
    - CI Colonial Battalion
    - CII Colonial Battalion
    - VIII Colonial Artillery Group (65/17 field guns)
    - 8th Colonial Cavalry Squadron
    - 8th Mixed Colonial Engineer Company
    - 8th Colonial Field Hospital
    - 8th Colonial Supply Column
  - XII Colonial Brigade, in Sebderat – Colonel Ugo Tabellini
    - XXXV Colonial Battalion
    - XXXVI Colonial Battalion
    - XLIII Colonial Battalion
    - XII Colonial Artillery Group (65/17 field guns)
    - 12th Colonial Cavalry Squadron
    - 12th Mixed Colonial Engineer Company
    - 12th Colonial Field Hospital
    - 12th Colonial Supply Column
  - 2nd CC.NN. Legion "Ivo Oliveti", in Asmara
    - XIII CC.NN. Battalion
    - XIV CC.NN. Battalion
    - XVI CC.NN. Battalion
    - CXVI CC.NN. Battalion
  - 1 × Colonial Artillery Group (77/28 field guns)
  - 1 × CC.NN. Anti-aircraft Group (75/27 CK and Model 35 anti-aircraft guns)
  - German Auto-transported Company (German volunteers)
  - Colonial Unit "Cheren" (Irregular forces)
  - Armoured Car Section "Eritrea" (1ZM armoured cars)

==== Amhara Troops Command ====
- Amhara Troops Command, in Gondar – Major-General Agostino Martini
  - III Colonial Brigade, in Debre Marqos – Colonel Saverio Maraventano
    - XI Colonial Battalion
    - XXIII Colonial Battalion
    - XXX Colonial Battalion
    - LXX Colonial Battalion
    - III Colonial Artillery Group (65/17 field guns)
    - 3rd Colonial Cavalry Squadron
    - 3rd Mixed Colonial Engineer Company
    - 3rd Colonial Field Hospital
    - 3rd Colonial Supply Column
  - IV Colonial Brigade, in Gondar – Colonel Livio Bonelli
    - XIV Colonial Battalion
    - XXV Colonial Battalion
    - XXVII Colonial Battalion
    - XXIX Colonial Battalion
    - IV Colonial Artillery Group (65/17 field guns)
    - 4th Colonial Cavalry Squadron
    - 4th Mixed Colonial Engineer Company
    - 4th Colonial Field Hospital
    - 4th Colonial Supply Column
  - XIX Colonial Brigade, in Injibara – Colonel Enrico Durante
    - XXI Colonial Battalion
    - LXV Colonial Battalion
    - LXXII Colonial Battalion
    - LXXXVI Colonial Battalion
    - XIX Colonial Artillery Group (65/17 field guns)
    - 19th Colonial Cavalry Squadron
    - 19th Mixed Colonial Engineer Company
    - 19th Colonial Field Hospital
    - 19th Colonial Supply Column
  - XXI Colonial Brigade, in Debre Tabor – Colonel Ignazio Angelini
    - LXXVII Colonial Battalion
    - LXXVIII Colonial Battalion
    - LXXIX Colonial Battalion
    - LXXX Colonial Battalion
    - XXI Colonial Artillery Group (65/17 field guns)
    - 21st Colonial Cavalry Squadron
    - 21st Mixed Colonial Engineer Company
    - 21st Colonial Field Hospital
    - 21st Colonial Supply Column
  - XXII Colonial Brigade, in Dangla – Colonel Adriano Torelli
    - LXVII Colonial Battalion
    - LXVIII Colonial Battalion
    - LXIX Colonial Battalion
    - LXXXI Colonial Battalion
    - XXII Colonial Artillery Group (65/17 field guns)
    - 22nd Colonial Cavalry Squadron
    - 22nd Mixed Colonial Engineer Company
    - 22nd Colonial Field Hospital
    - 22nd Colonial Supply Column
  - 3rd CC.NN. Legion "Reginaldo Giuliani", in Gondar
    - CXXXI CC.NN. Battalion
    - CXLI CC.NN. Battalion
    - CXLVI CC.NN. Battalion
    - CLI CC.NN. Battalion
  - 7th CC.NN. Legion "F. Battisti", in Dessie
    - CLXV CC.NN. Battalion
    - CCXL CC.NN. Battalion
    - DCXXX CC.NN. Battalion
    - DCXXXV CC.NN. Battalion
  - III Colonial Battalion
  - CVIII Colonial Battalion
  - CXIV Colonial Battalion
  - 1 × CC.NN. Anti-aircraft Group (75/27 CK and Model 35 anti-aircraft guns)
  - Colonial Unit "Amhara" (Irregular forces)
  - I Colonial Frontier Units Group
  - II Colonial Frontier Units Group
  - Armoured Car Section "Amhara" (1ZM armoured cars)

=== Southern Sector ===
- Southern Sector, in Jimma – General Pietro Gazzera (doubles as commander of the Galla and Sidama Troops Command)

==== Galla and Sidama Troops Command ====
- Galla and Sidama Troops Command, in Jimma – General Pietro Gazzera
  - I Colonial Brigade, in Magi – Colonel Guido Pialorsi
    - I Colonial Battalion
    - VI Colonial Battalion
    - VIII Colonial Battalion
    - XVIII Colonial Battalion
    - III Colonial Artillery Group (75/13 howitzers)
    - 1st Colonial Cavalry Squadron
    - 1st Mixed Colonial Engineer Company
    - 1st Colonial Field Hospital
    - 1st Colonial Supply Column
  - IX Colonial Brigade, in Yabelo – Colonel Flaminio Orrigo
    - II Colonial Battalion
    - XVII Colonial Battalion
    - LIX Colonial Battalion
    - LX Colonial Battalion
    - IX Colonial Artillery Group (65/17 field guns)
    - 9th Colonial Cavalry Squadron
    - 9th Mixed Colonial Engineer Company
    - 9th Colonial Field Hospital
    - 9th Colonial Supply Column
  - X Colonial Brigade, in Gimbi – Colonel Giuseppe Cloza
    - XXVIII Colonial Battalion
    - LV Colonial Battalion
    - CLXXXI Colonial Battalion
    - CLXXXVII Colonial Battalion
    - X Colonial Artillery Group (65/17 field guns)
    - 10th Colonial Cavalry Squadron
    - 10th Mixed Colonial Engineer Company
    - 10th Colonial Field Hospital
    - 10th Colonial Supply Column
  - XVIII Colonial Brigade, in Jimma – Colonel Bartolemeo Minola
    - XVI Colonial Battalion
    - LXI Colonial Battalion
    - CLXXXII Colonial Battalion
    - CLXXXIII Colonial Battalion
    - XVIII Colonial Artillery Group (65/17 field guns)
    - 18th Colonial Cavalry Squadron
    - 18th Mixed Colonial Engineer Company
    - 18th Colonial Field Hospital
    - 18th Colonial Supply Column
  - XXV Colonial Brigade, in Dolo – Lieutenant-Colonel Giorgio Rolandi
    - VII Colonial Battalion
    - XXVIII Colonial Battalion
    - LIV Colonial Battalion
    - XXV Colonial Artillery Group (65/17 field guns)
    - 25th Colonial Cavalry Squadron
    - 25th Mixed Colonial Engineer Company
    - 25th Colonial Field Hospital
    - 25th Colonial Supply Column
  - 6th CC.NN. Legion "Luigi Valcarenghi", in Jimma
    - DCCXXXI CC.NN. Battalion
    - DCCXLV CC.NN. Battalion
  - VI Colonial Cavalry Squadrons Group
  - XI Colonial Cavalry Squadrons Group
  - 1 × CC.NN. Anti-aircraft Group (75/27 CK and Model 35 anti-aircraft guns)
  - III Colonial Frontier Units Group
  - IV Colonial Frontier Units Group
  - V Colonial Frontier Units Group
  - Colonial Unit "Gallabi" (Irregular forces)
  - Colonial Unit "Uollame" (Irregular forces)
  - Colonial Unit "Uolkitti" (Irregular forces)
  - Armoured Car Section "Galla-Sidama" (1ZM armoured cars)

=== Eastern Sector ===
- Eastern Sector, in Addis Ababa – Lieutenant-General Guglielmo Nasi

==== Harar Troops Command ====
- Harar Troops Command, in Harar – Major-General Carlo De Simone
  - XIII Colonial Brigade, in Dire Dawa – Brigadier-General Cesare Nam
    - XX Colonial Battalion
    - XXXIX Colonial Battalion
    - XLVIII Colonial Battalion
    - XIII Colonial Artillery Group (65/17 field guns)
    - 13th Colonial Cavalry Squadron
    - 13th Mixed Colonial Engineer Company
    - 13th Colonial Field Hospital
    - 13th Colonial Supply Column
  - XIV Colonial Brigade, in Harar – Colonel Siliprandi
    - XXXVII Colonial Battalion
    - LXIV Colonial Battalion
    - LXXXIII Colonial Battalion
    - XIV Colonial Artillery Group (65/17 field guns)
    - 14th Colonial Cavalry Squadron
    - 14th Mixed Colonial Engineer Company
    - 14th Colonial Field Hospital
    - 14th Colonial Supply Column
  - XV Colonial Brigade, in Jijiga – Major Romano
    - XXXVIII Colonial Battalion
    - XL Colonial Battalion
    - XLIX Colonial Battalion
    - CXLII Colonial Battalion
    - XV Colonial Artillery Group (65/17 field guns)
    - 15th Colonial Cavalry Squadron
    - 15th Mixed Colonial Engineer Company
    - 15th Colonial Field Hospital
    - 15th Colonial Supply Column
  - XVII Colonial Brigade, in Lassar – Colonel Focanti
    - XLII Colonial Battalion
    - LVIII Colonial Battalion
    - LXVI Colonial Battalion
    - XVII Colonial Artillery Group (65/17 field guns)
    - 17th Colonial Cavalry Squadron
    - 17th Mixed Colonial Engineer Company
    - 17th Colonial Field Hospital
    - 17th Colonial Supply Column
  - 4th CC.NN. Legion "Filippo Corridoni", in Harar
    - CLXIV CC.NN. Battalion
    - CLXVI CC.NN. Battalion
    - DII CC.NN. Battalion
    - DIV CC.NN. Battalion
  - I Arab-Somali Battalion
  - LXV Machine Gun Battalion (detached from the 65th Infantry Division "Granatieri di Savoia")
  - XIV Colonial Cavalry Squadrons Group
  - 1x Colonial Artillery Group (77/28 field guns)
  - 1x CC.NN. Anti-aircraft Group (75/27 CK and Model 35 anti-aircraft guns)
  - VI Dubat Units Group
  - Colonial Unit "Fanelli" (Irregular forces)
  - Colonial Unit "Svianò" (Irregular forces)
  - Colonial Unit "Asellè" (Irregular forces)
  - Colonial Unit "Alefà" (Irregular forces)
  - 1st Armoured Car Squadron (Fiat 611 armoured cars)
  - Armoured Car Section "Harar" (1ZM armoured cars)

==== Scioa Troops Command ====
- Scioa Troops Command, in Addis Ababa – Major-General Ettore Scala
  - XX Colonial Brigade, in Baidoa – Colonel Giuseppe Azzolini
    - XL Colonial Battalion
    - LXXIV Colonial Battalion
    - LXXV Colonial Battalion
    - LXXVI Colonial Battalion
    - XX Colonial Artillery Group (65/17 field guns)
    - 20th Colonial Cavalry Squadron
    - 20th Mixed Colonial Engineer Company
    - 20th Colonial Field Hospital
    - 20th Colonial Supply Column
  - XXIII Colonial Brigade, in Waliso – Lieutenant-Colonel Casabassa
    - LXXXVIII Colonial Battalion
    - LXXXIX Colonial Battalion
    - XC Colonial Battalion
    - XXIII Colonial Artillery Group (65/17 field guns)
    - 23rd Colonial Cavalry Squadron
    - 23rd Mixed Colonial Engineer Company
    - 23rd Colonial Field Hospital
    - 23rd Colonial Supply Column
  - 1st CC.NN. Legion "Arnaldo Mussolini", in Addis Ababa
    - II CC.NN. Battalion
    - IV CC.NN. Battalion
    - V CC.NN. Battalion
    - XI CC.NN. Battalion
  - Addis Ababa Artillery Command, in Addis Ababa
    - 2 × CC.NN. Anti-aircraft groups (75/46 anti-aircraft guns)
    - 1 × Heavy Field Artillery Battery (104/32 howitzers)
    - 1 × Heavy Field Artillery Battery (149/13 howitzers)
    - 1 × Position Artillery Battery (120/45 naval guns in fixed positions)
    - 7 × Position Artillery batteries (120/25 field guns in fixed positions)
  - I Colonial Cavalry Squadrons Group
  - II Colonial Cavalry Squadrons Group
  - III Colonial Cavalry Squadrons Group
  - V Colonial Cavalry Squadrons Group
  - XV Colonial Cavalry Squadrons Group
  - XL Machine Gun Battalion (detached from the 40th Infantry Division "Cacciatori d'Africa")
  - Colonial Units Group "Altopiano" (Irregular forces)
  - Colonial Units Group "Rolle" (Irregular forces)
  - Colonial Units Group "Scioa" (Irregular forces)
  - Colonial Units Group "Uollo Ambassel" (Irregular forces)
  - Colonial Unit "Auasc" (Irregular forces)
  - Colonial Unit "Bolè" (Irregular forces)
  - Colonial Unit "Buriè" (Irregular forces)
  - Colonial Unit "Doduò" (Irregular forces)
  - Colonial Unit "Moggiò" (Irregular forces)
  - 3 × Anti-tank companies (47/32 anti-tank guns)
  - Armoured Car Section "Scioa" (1ZM armoured cars)

=== Autonomous Giuba Sector ===
- Autonomous Giuba Sector, in Mogadishu – Major-General Gustavo Pesenti
  - XCI Colonial Brigade, in Jilib – Colonel Italo Carnevali
    - LXXV Colonial Battalion
    - CXCIV Colonial Battalion
    - CXCVI Colonial Battalion
    - XCI Colonial Artillery Group (70/15 field guns)
    - 91st Colonial Cavalry Squadron
    - 91st Mixed Colonial Engineer Company
    - 91st Colonial Field Hospital
    - 91st Colonial Supply Column
  - XCII Colonial Brigade, in Barawa – Colonel Giaume
    - LXXIV Colonial Battalion
    - CXCI Colonial Battalion
    - CXCII Colonial Battalion
    - XCII Colonial Artillery Group (70/15 field guns)
    - 92nd Colonial Cavalry Squadron
    - 92nd Mixed Colonial Engineer Company
    - 92nd Colonial Field Hospital
    - 92nd Colonial Supply Column
  - 5th CC.NN. Legion "Luigi Razza", in Mogadishu
    - DV CC.NN. Battalion
    - DVI CC.NN. Battalion
    - DLXXXV CC.NN. Battalion
    - DCXXXI CC.NN. Battalion
  - IV Colonial Coastal Battalion
  - V Colonial Coastal Battalion
  - CI Colonial Artillery Group (70/15 field guns)
  - Dubat Grouping
    - I Dubat Units Group
    - II Dubat Units Group
    - III Dubat Units Group
    - IV Dubat Units Group
    - V Dubat Units Group
  - VI Colonial Frontier Units Group
  - Colonial Units Group "Desciech Uama" (Irregular forces)
  - Armoured Car Section "Giuba" (1ZM armoured cars)

=== General Reserve ===
- General Reserve, in Addis Ababa – Lieutenant-General Claudio Trezzani, Chief of Staff of the Italian East African Armed Forces Command
  - IV Motorized Artillery Group (77/28 field guns)
  - XXV Motorized Artillery Group (77/28 field guns)
  - XXVI Motorized Artillery Group (77/28 field guns)
  - XXXI Motorized Artillery Group (77/28 field guns)
  - XXXII Motorized Artillery Group (77/28 field guns)
  - CII Motorized Artillery Group (105/28 howitzers)
  - CIII Motorized Artillery Group (105/28 howitzers)
  - CIV Motorized Artillery Group (105/28 howitzers)
  - CV Motorized Artillery Group (105/28 howitzers)
  - CVI Motorized Artillery Group (105/28 howitzers)
  - 1st Special Tank Company "L", in Addis Ababa (L3/35 tankettes)
  - 2nd Special Tank Company "M", in Addis Ababa (M11/39 tanks)

==== 40th Infantry Division "Cacciatori d'Africa" ====
- 40th Infantry Division "Cacciatori d'Africa", in Addis Ababa – Major-General Giovanni Varda
  - 210th Infantry Regiment "Bisagno"
    - Command Company
    - 2 × Fusiliers battalions
  - 211th Infantry Regiment "Pescara"
    - Command Company
    - 2 × Fusiliers battalions
  - III CC.NN. Battalion
  - XV CC.NN. Battalion
  - I African Motorized Artillery Group (65/17 field guns)
  - XVIII Mixed African Engineer Battalion
  - Divisional Services

==== 65th Infantry Division "Granatieri di Savoia" ====
- 65th Infantry Division "Granatieri di Savoia", in Addis Ababa – Major-General Amedeo Liberati
  - 10th Grenadier Regiment
    - Command Company
    - 2 × Grenadier battalions
    - Alpini Battalion "Uork Amba"
    - Support Weapons Company (65/17 field guns)
    - Mortar Company (81mm Mod. 35 mortars)
  - 11th Granatieri Regiment
    - Command Company
    - 2 × Grenadier battalions
    - African Bersaglieri Battalion
    - Support Weapons Company (65/17 field guns)
    - Mortar Company (81mm Mod. 35 mortars)
  - 11th East African CC.NN. Legion
    - I CC.NN. Battalion
    - XII CC.NN. Battalion
  - 60th Artillery Regiment "Granatieri di Savoia" (Motorized)
    - Command Unit
    - I Group (65/17 field guns)
    - II Group (65/17 field guns)
    - III Group (65/17 field guns)
    - IV Group (100/17 howitzers)
    - V Group (105/28 howitzers)
    - Ammunition and Supply Unit
  - Cavalry Squadrons Group "Cavalieri di Neghelli" ("Knights of Neghelli")
    - 2 × Cavalry squadrons
    - 1 × Tank Squadron (L3/33 tankettes)
  - 60th Signal Engineers Company
  - 60th Engineer Company
  - Medical Section
  - Supply Section
  - Carabinieri Section

==== Autonomous brigades ====
- II Colonial Brigade, in Ankober – Colonel Orlando Lorenzini
  - IV Colonial Battalion
  - V Colonial Battalion
  - IX Colonial Battalion
  - X Colonial Battalion
  - II Colonial Artillery Group (65/17 field guns)
  - 2nd Colonial Cavalry Squadron
  - 2nd Mixed Colonial Engineer Company
  - 2nd Colonial Field Hospital
  - 2nd Colonial Supply Column
- VI Colonial Brigade, in Dessie – Colonel Agostino Magrini
  - XIX Colonial Battalion
  - XXIV Colonial Battalion
  - XXXI Colonial Battalion
  - XXXIV Colonial Battalion
  - VI Colonial Artillery Group (65/17 field guns)
  - 6th Colonial Cavalry Squadron
  - 6th Mixed Colonial Engineer Company
  - 6th Colonial Field Hospital
  - 6th Colonial Supply Column
- VII Colonial Brigade, in Ambo – Colonel Tiburzio Rean
  - XIII Colonial Battalion
  - XV Colonial Battalion
  - XLV Colonial Battalion
  - VII Colonial Artillery Group (65/17 field guns)
  - 7th Colonial Cavalry Squadron
  - 7th Mixed Colonial Engineer Company
  - 7th Colonial Field Hospital
  - 7th Colonial Supply Column
- XI Colonial Brigade, in Fiche – Colonel Francesco Prina
  - LI Colonial Battalion
  - LII Colonial Battalion
  - LVI Colonial Battalion
  - XI Colonial Artillery Group (65/17 field guns)
  - 11th Colonial Cavalry Squadron
  - 11th Mixed Colonial Engineer Company
  - 11th Colonial Field Hospital
  - 11th Colonial Supply Column
- XVI Colonial Brigade, in Teseney – Colonel Manlio Manetti
  - XXII Colonial Battalion
  - XXIII Colonial Battalion
  - XLVII Colonial Battalion
  - LIII Colonial Battalion
  - XVI Colonial Artillery Group (65/17 field guns)
  - 16th Colonial Cavalry Squadron
  - 16th Mixed Colonial Engineer Company
  - 16th Colonial Field Hospital
  - 16th Colonial Supply Column
- XLI Colonial Brigade, in Adigrat – Brigadier-General Ugo Fongoli
  - XCVIII Colonial Battalion
  - XCIX Colonial Battalion
  - CXXXI Colonial Battalion
  - CXXXII Colonial Battalion
  - XLI Colonial Artillery Group (65/17 field guns)
  - 41st Colonial Cavalry Squadron
  - 41st Mixed Colonial Engineer Company
  - 41st Colonial Field Hospital
  - 41st Colonial Supply Column
- LXXXV Colonial Brigade, in Shashamane – Colonel Lannuti
  - CLXXXIII Colonial Battalion
  - CLXXXIV Colonial Battalion
  - CLXXXV Colonial Battalion
  - CLXXXVI Colonial Battalion
  - LXXXV Colonial Artillery Group (65/17 field guns)
  - 85th Colonial Cavalry Squadron
  - 85th Mixed Colonial Engineer Company
  - 85th Colonial Field Hospital
  - 85th Colonial Supply Column

=== Colonial divisions ===
Over the course of the war the Italians combined some of the colonial brigades in divisions, however the sources as to which brigades were attached to which division and for how long are contradictory. Below follows the division listing as given by the Italian wikipedia at it:Divisioni del Regio Esercito nella seconda guerra mondiale#Divisioni coloniali - Africa Orientale Italiana:

Division	Brigades	Activated	Dissolved
Harar Colonial Division	XIII Colonial Brigade; XIX Colonial Brigade; XV Colonial Brigade	10 June 1940	
1st Eritrean Division	V Colonial Brigade; XLIV Colonial Brigade		
2nd Eritrean Division	VIII Colonial Brigade; XVI Colonial Brigade		
3rd Colonial Division	VI Colonial Brigade; XII Colonial Brigade	10 February 1941	
4th Colonial Division	XI Colonial Brigade; XLI Colonial Brigade	4 February 1941	
21st Colonial Division	IX Colonial Brigade; XVIII Colonial Brigade	10 June 1940	
22nd Colonial Division	I Colonial Brigade; LXXXVI Colonial Brigade	10 June 1940	9 luglio 1941
23rd Colonial Division	X Colonial Brigade ?	10 June 1940	
24th Colonial Division	XXV Colonial Brigade; LXXXV Colonial Brigade		
25th Colonial Division	? ?		
26th Colonial Division	VII Colonial Brigade ?		
101st Somali Division	XX Colonial Brigade; XCII Colonial Brigade		
102nd Somali Division	XCI Colonial Brigade ?		

=== May 1941 ===
- Supreme Commander FF AA AOI: Lieutenant-General Pietro Gazzera (Note: All data from Nafziger 2012, unless indicated. (Original source, National Archives Microcopy No. T-821, Roll 144, American Historical Association Committee for the Study of War Documents, Washington, DC. 1960.))

Total 127,000 men

- Southern Sector - Lieutenant-General Pietro Gazzera (80,000 men)
  - Left Zone, in Omo - Major-General Antonio Tissi
    - 21st Colonial Division - Brigadier-General Ettore Caffaratti
    - 24th Colonial Division - Brigadier-General Emanuele Beraudo di Pralormo
    - 25th Colonial Division - Brigadier-General Amedeo Liberati
    - 101st Colonial Division - Brigadier-General Alfredo Baccari
  - Central Zone - Major-General Ettore Scala
    - 22nd Colonial Division - Brigadier-General Guido Pialorsi
  - Dabus-Didessa Zone - Major-General Carlo De Simone
- Western Sector - Lieutenant-General Guglielmo Nasi (17,000 Italian & 23,000 colonial troops)
  - Gondar Fortified Place - Lieutenant-General Guglielmo Nasi (30,000 men)
  - Uolchefit Fortress - Lieutenant-Colonel Mario Gonella (4,000 men)
  - Debra Tabor Fortress - Colonel Ignazio Angelini (6,000 men)
- Danaclia Sector - Brigadier-General Pietro Piacentini (2,400 Italian and 3,300 colonial troops)
- Tio-Assab-Rahesta Garrison - Frigate-Capitan Guglielmo Bolla (800 men)
- Sardo-Dobi Presidio - Colonel Umberto Raugei (Royal Italian Navy, 1,300 men)
- Elidar-Manda Sector - Brigadier-General Pietro Piacentini (Royal Italian Air Force, 100 pilots)
- Batie Sector - Brigadier-General Luigi Frusci (2,500 Italian and 3,000 colonial troops)
- Isolated units:
  - Migiurtina Zone - Colonel R. de Maria
  - Arussi Zone - Brigadier-General Alborghetti

== Comando Aeronautica Africa Orientale Italiana, June 1940 ==
Generale di Squadra Aerea Pietro Pinna Parpaglia (Note: All data from Shores 1996 unless specified.)

=== Northern Sector Command ===
The Northern Sector Command (Italian: Commando Settore Nord) was based in Asmara.

- 26th Group, at Gondar
  - 11th Squadron (6 × Ca.133)
  - 13th Squadron (6 × Ca.133, at Bahar Dar, converting to SM.81)
- 27th Group, at Dessie
  - 18th Squadron (6 × Ca.133)
  - 52nd Squadron (6 × Ca.133)
  - 118th Squadron (6 × Ca.133, converting to SM. 81)
- 28th Group, at Zula and Gura in 1940; Sciasciamanna in 1941
  - 10th Squadron (6 × SM.81)
  - 19th Squadron (6 × SM.81)
- 29th Group, at Mille, Dessie, Sciasciamanna, Yavello in 1940; Bardera in 1941
  - 62nd Squadron (6 × SM.81)
  - 63rd Squadron (6 × SM.81)
  - 412th Squadron (9 × CR.42 - 4 at Massawa, 5 at Gura)
  - 413th Squadron (9 × CR.42 at Assab)
  - 414th Squadron (6 × CR.42 at Gura)
- Gasbarini Group, at Agordat
  - 41st Squadron (6 × Ca.133)
  - Northern Sector General Staff Squadron (6 × Ca.133)

=== Western Sector Command ===
The Western Sector Command (Commando Settore Ouest) was based in Addis Ababa. The Command was formed on 1 August 1940 and disbanded on 19 August 1941.

Generale di Brigata Aerea Collati

- 4th Terrestrial Bomber Group (Lieutenant-Colonel Branca)
  - 14th Squadron (6 × SM.81, at Diredawa)
  - 15th Squadron (6 × SM.81, at Diredawa)
- 44th Group
  - 6th Squadron (6 × SM.79, at Diredawa)
  - 7th Squadron (6 × SM.79, at Diredawa)
- 49th Group
  - 61st Squadron (6 × Ca.133, at Jimma)
  - 64th Squadron (6 × Ca.133, at Jimma)
  - 65th Squadron (6 × Ca.133, at Neghelli)
  - 66th Squadron (3 × Ca.133, at Yavello)
  - 110th Squadron (9 × Ro.37, at Diredawa)
  - 410th Squadron (9 × CR.32, at Diredawa)
  - 411th Squadron (9 × CR.32, at Addis Ababa)
  - Southern Sector General Staff Squadron

=== Southern Sector Command ===
The Southern Sector Command (Commando Settore Sud) was based in Mogadishu.(All data from Nafziger 2012, unless indicated; original source: National Archives Microcopy No. T-821, Roll 144, American Historical Association Committee for the Study of War Documents, Washington, DC. 1960.)

- 25th Terrestrial Bomber Group (Major Santagata)
  - 8th Squadron (6 × Ca.133, at Gobwen)
  - 9th Squadron (6 × Ca.133, at Lugh Ferrandi)
  - Southern Sector General Staff Squadron (7 × Ca.133, at Mogadishu)
- 1st Transport Group
- 2nd Transport Group
- CRA Addis Ababa
  - 4th Principal Magazine
  - 6th M.S.A. Magazine
- 1st M.S.A. Magazine
- 5th M.S.A. Magazine
- Squadron S.M.
- Asmara Airport Repair Service
- Assab Airfield Repair Service
- Bahar Dar Airfield Repair Service
- Dessie Airfield Repair Service
- Dire Dawa Airfield Repair Service
- Gimma Airfield Repair Service
- Gondar Airfield Repair Service
- Gura Airfield Repair Service
- Massaua Airfield Repair Service
- Mogadishu Airfield Repair Service

== British and Commonwealth forces ==
Commander-in-Chief – General Archibald Wavell, Cairo

=== Northern front, Sudan ===
- Commander – Major-General William Platt
  - 1st Battalion Worcestershire Regiment
  - 1st Battalion Essex Regiment
  - 2nd Battalion West Yorkshire Regiment
  - Six machine-gun companies of the Sudan Defence Force

=== Southern front, Kenya ===
- GOC East Africa Force – Major-General Douglas Dickinson (Note: Promoted to acting lieutenant-general in August 1940)
  - Southern Brigade/1st Brigade King's African Rifles (KAR) – Brigadier Charles Christopher Fowkes
  - Northern Brigade/2nd Brigade KAR Brigadier Colin Frederick Blackden
  - East African Reconnaissance Regiment, later named East African Armoured Car Regiment
  - 22nd (Derajat) Mountain Battery (Frontier Force)

=== British Somaliland ===
- Commander – Lieutenant-Colonel Arthur Reginald Chater to 11 August 1940, Major-General Reade Godwin-Austen from 11 August to 17 August (Note: This section cited to Playfair (1954) unless specified. Chater was promoted to Brigadier in August.)
  - Somaliland Camel Corps
  - 1st Battalion Northern Rhodesia Regiment
  - 2nd (Nyasaland) Battalion King's African Rifles
  - 3rd Battalion 15th Punjab Regiment (from 1 July)
  - 1st Battalion 2nd Punjab Regiment (from 7 August)
  - 2nd Battalion The Black Watch (from 8 August)
  - 1st East African Light Battery (Four 3.7-inch howitzers)

== British and Commonwealth forces, 1941 ==
Commander-in-Chief – General Archibald Wavell

=== Northern front, Eritrea ===
Commander – Lieutenant-General William Platt

- Corps artillery and armour
  - B Squadron 4th Royal Tank Regiment (RTR) (about six Matilda II infantry tanks)
  - 68 Medium Regiment, Royal Artillery (RA) (two batteries)
  - Jammu and Kashmir Mountain Battery, Indian Army
  - Battery, Sudan Horse, Sudan Defence Force
  - P Battery (Anti-tank) Royal Horse Artillery (RHA)
  - 41 Light Anti-aircraft Battery, Royal Artillery
- Corps infantry reserve
  - Two Motor Machine Gun Companies, Sudan Defence Force
  - No. 51 Commando (a mixed Arab and Jewish battalion raised in the British Mandate of Palestine. Attached to 5th Indian Infantry Division for periods of the campaign.)
- 4th Indian Infantry Division – Major-General Noel Beresford-Peirse
  - The Central India Horse (21st King George V's Own Horse) – the Divisional reconnaissance regiment
  - 5th Indian Infantry Brigade, Brigadier Wilfrid Lewis Lloyd
    - 1st Battalion Royal Fusiliers
    - 3rd Battalion 1st Punjab Regiment
    - 4th Battalion (Outram's) 6th Rajputana Rifles
  - 7th Indian Infantry Brigade, Brigadier Harold Rawdon Briggs
    - 1st Battalion Royal Sussex Regiment (detached to Briggsforce)
    - 4th Battalion 16th Punjab Regiment (detached to Briggsforce)
    - 4th Battalion 11th Sikh Regiment (detached to Gazelle Force)
  - 11th Indian Infantry Brigade, Brigadier Reginald Savory
    - 2nd Battalion The Queen's Own Cameron Highlanders
    - 1st Battalion (Wellesley's) 6th Rajputana Rifles
    - 4th Battalion 7th Rajput Regiment (until January 1941)
    - 3rd Battalion 14th Punjab Regiment (from January 1941)
    - 2nd Battalion 5th Mahratta Light Infantry
  - Gazelle Force, Colonel Frank Messervy (Note: Details on Gazelle Force taken from Prasad (1963) unless specified.)
    - 1st Duke of York's Own Skinner's Horse (detached from 5th Indian Infantry Division)
    - 4th Battalion 11th Sikh Regiment (detached from 7 Brigade)
    - 3 motor machine-gun companies of the Sudan Defence Force
    - 390th (Sussex Yeomanry) Field Battery of 144 Field Regiment (detached from 5th Indian Infantry Division)
  - Royal Artillery, Brigadier William H. B. Mirrless
    - 1 Field Regiment RA
    - 11/80 Field Battery RA
    - 52/98 Field Battery RA
    - 25 Field Regiment RA
    - 31 Field Regiment RA
  - Engineers
    - 4 Field Company King George V's Own Bengal Sappers and Miners, IE
    - 12 Field Company Queen Victoria's Own Madras Sappers and Miners, IE
    - 18 Field Company Royal Bombay Sappers and Miners, IE
    - 11 Field Park Company Queen Victoria's Own Madras Sappers and Miners, IE
- 5th Indian Infantry Division – Major-General Lewis Heath
  - 1st Duke of York's Own Skinner's Horse (reconnaissance regiment) (detached to Gazelle Force)
  - 9th Indian Infantry Brigade, Brigadier Mosley Mayne (to 1 March) Brigadier Frank Messervy (from 1 March to 13 April), Brigadier Bernard Fletcher (from 13 April)
    - 2nd Battalion West Yorkshire Regiment
    - 3rd Battalion 5th Mahratta Light Infantry
    - 3rd Royal battalion 12th Frontier Force Regiment
    - 3 motor machine-gun companies of the Sudan Defence Force
  - 10th Indian Infantry Brigade, Brigadier William "Bill" Slim (to 21 January), Lieutenant-Colonel Bernard Fletcher (from 21 January to 20 March), Brigadier Thomas "Pete" Rees (from 21 March)
    - 1st Battalion The Essex Regiment (until late November 1940)
    - 2nd Battalion Highland Light Infantry (from late November 1940)
    - 4th Battalion 10th Baluch Regiment
    - 3rd Battalion 18th Royal Garhwal Rifles
  - 29th Indian Infantry Brigade, Brigadier John Marriott
    - 1st Battalion the Worcestershire Regiment
    - 3rd Battalion 2nd Punjab Regiment
    - 6th Royal Battalion 13th Frontier Force Rifles
  - Royal Artillery, Brigadier Claude Vallentin
    - 4 Field Regiment RA
    - 28 Field Regiment RA
    - 144 Field Regiment RA
  - Engineers
    - 2 Field Company King George V's Own Bengal Sappers and Miners, IE
    - 20 Field Company Royal Bombay Sappers and Miners, IE
    - 21 Field Company Royal Bombay Sappers and Miners, IE (see Premindra Singh Bhagat)
    - 44 Field Park Company Queen Victoria's Own Madras Sappers and Miners, IE
- Briggs Force – Brigadier Harold Rawdon Briggs
  - 1st Battalion Royal Sussex Regiment (detached from 7 Brigade, 4th Indian Infantry Division)
  - 4th Battalion 16th Punjab Regiment (detached from 7 Brigade, 4th Indian Infantry Division)
  - Brigade of the East (Brigade d'Orient) (Free French) – Colonel Ralph Monclar
    - 1er Bataillon de Legion Etrangere (1st Battalion of French Foreign Legion)
    - Bataillon de Marche 3 (3rd provisional battalion of Senegalese tirailleurs)
    - 3e Cie du 1er bataillon d' infanterie de marine (3rd Company, 1st Marine Infantry Battalion)
    - 1er Escadron de Spahis Marocains (1st Squadron of Moroccan Spahis)
    - 1er Groupe d'Artillerie Coloniale (1st Colonial Artillery Battalion)
  - One motor machine-gun company of the Sudan Defence Force
  - One Battery from 25th Field Regiment, Royal Artillery (4th Indian Infantry Division)
  - 7th Field Company King George V's Own Bengal Sappers and Miners, IE
- Gideon Force (in Gojjam Province, Ethiopia), Colonel Orde Wingate
  - Sudan Defence Force Frontier Battalion
  - 2nd Ethiopian Battalion
- Mission 101 (in Gojjam Province, Ethiopia), Brigadier Daniel Sandford
  - Many Operational Centres, small groups of officers and NCOs operating in enemy territory, providing training and arms to Ethiopian patriot forces loyal to Emperor Haile Selassie I and co-ordinating their operations.

=== Southern front, Kenya ===
- Commander – Lieutenant-General Alan Cunningham
  - Corps troops
    - 1 East African Armoured Car Regiment (less two squadrons)
    - 1st South African Light Tank Company
    - 1st South African Medium Brigade (1st and 2nd Medium Batteries)
    - 53rd East African Light Battery
    - 4th Rhodesian Anti-Tank Battery
  - 1st South African Division – Major-General George Brink
    - 1st South African Infantry Brigade – Brigadier Dan Pienaar (detached to 12th African Division until 7 March, 11th African Division until 9 May, then 5th Indian Infantry Division, 10–22 May for Amba Alagi)
      - 1st Duke of Edinburgh's Own Rifles
      - 1st Royal Natal Carabineers
      - 1st Transvaal Scottish
      - 3rd South African Armoured Car Company
      - 4th Field Brigade (10, 11, 12 Field Batteries) South African Artillery
      - 1st Field Company, South African Engineers
    - 2nd South African Infantry Brigade – Brigadier F.L.A. Buchanan
      - 1st Natal Mounted Rifles
      - 1st Field Force Battalion
      - 2nd Field Force Battalion
      - 2nd South African Armoured Car Company
      - 12th Field Company, South African Engineers
    - 5th South African Infantry Brigade – Brigadier Bertram Armstrong
      - 1st South African Irish
      - 2nd Regiment Botha
      - 3rd Transvaal Scottish
      - 1st South African Armoured Car Company
      - 5th Field Company, South African Engineers
    - One platoon 1/3 King's African Rifles (Machine gun platoon)
    - Divisional Artillery:
      - 3rd Field Brigade (7, 8, 9 Field Batteries) South African Artillery
      - 6th Anti-aircraft Battery (one section), South African Artillery
      - 3rd Anti-tank Battery, South African Artillery
  - 11th African Division – Major-General Harry Wetherall
    - 21st (East African) Brigade – Brigadier Alan MacDougall Ritchie (detached to 1st South African Division from 27 February until 6 April and to 12th African Division thereafter)
      - 1/2 The King's African Rifles
      - 1st The Northern Rhodesia Regiment
      - 1/4 The King's African Rifles
      - 53rd (Gold Coast) Field Company, West African Engineers
    - 26th (East African) Brigade – Brigadier William Dimoline (detached as an independent brigade for the duration of the campaign)
      - 2/2nd Kings African Rifles
      - 4/4th Kings African Rifles
      - 3/6th Kings African Rifles
    - 23rd (Nigerian) Brigade – Brigadier Gerald Smallwood
      - 1st The Nigeria Regiment
      - 2nd The Nigeria Regiment
      - 3rd The Nigeria Regiment
      - 52 (Nigeria) Light Battery West African Artillery
      - 51 (Nigeria) Field Company, West African Engineers
    - 1st East African Armoured Car Regiment (C Squadron)
    - One platoon 1/3 King's African Rifles (Machine gun platoon)
    - Divisional Artillery
      - 7th Field Brigade (5, 17, 18 Field Batteries) South African Artillery
      - 6th Anti-aircraft Battery (one section), South African Artillery
      - 1st Anti-tank Battery, South African Artillery
    - Engineers
      - 16 Field Company, South African Engineers
  - 12th African Division – Major-General Reade Godwin-Austen
    - 22nd (East African) Brigade – Brigadier Charles Christopher Fowkes until 3 March then Lieutenant-Colonel Colin Frederick Blackden (detached to 11th African Division from 23 February to 1 March and from 12 March to 26 July)
      - 1/1 The King's African Rifles
      - 1/6 The King's African Rifles
      - 5th The King's African Rifles
      - 22 Mountain Battery Indian Artillery
      - 54 Field Company, East African Engineers
    - 25th (East African) Brigade – Brigadier W. Owen (detached to 1st South African Division until 6 April)
      - 2/3rd Kings African Rifles
      - 2/4th Kings African Rifles
      - 27 Mountain Battery, Indian Artillery
      - Detachment Somaliland Camel Corps Armoured cars
    - 24th (Gold Coast) Brigade – Brigadier Collen Edward Melville Richards
      - 1st Gold Coast Regiment
      - 2nd Gold Coast Regiment
      - 3rd Gold Coast Regiment
      - 51 (Gold Coast) Light Battery West African Artillery
      - 52nd Gold Coast Field Company, West African Engineers
    - 1st East African Armoured Car Regiment (B Squadron)
    - One company less one platoon 1/3 King's African Rifles (Machine gun)
    - Divisional Artillery
      - 1st Field Battery South African Artillery
      - 6th Anti-aircraft Battery (one section), South African Artillery
      - 2nd Anti-tank Battery, South African Artillery
    - Engineers
      - 3rd South African Field Company

=== British Somaliland ===
- Commander – Brigadier Arthur Reginald Chater
  - 1st battalion 2nd Punjab Regiment (until end March 1941 from Aden)
  - 3rd battalion 15th Punjab Regiment (from Aden)
  - Somaliland Camel Corps (reforming)

== See also ==
- East African campaign (World War II)
- Colonial heads of Italian East Africa
- MVSN Colonial Militia
- German Motorized Company
- Zaptie
- Dubats

== Sources ==
- Dunning, C. (1998). Courage Alone: The Italian Air Force 1940–1943. Aldershot: Hikoki. ISBN 1-902109-02-3.
- Mackenzie, Compton (1951). Eastern Epic: September 1939 – March 1943 Defence. Vol. I. London: Chatto & Windus. OCLC 1412578.
- Nafziger, G. (2012) [2011]. Nafziger Orders of Battle Collection: Finding Aid (online ed.). Fort Leavenworth, KS: Combined Arms Research Library (U.S. Army Command and General Staff College). OCLC 528648446. Archived from the original on 10 March 2016.
- Playfair, I. S. O.; et al. (1954). Butler, J. R. M. (ed.). The Mediterranean and Middle East: The Early Successes Against Italy (to May 1941). History of the Second World War, United Kingdom Military Series. Vol. I. HMSO. OCLC 494123451.
- Qureshi, N. A.; Pal, D.; Pandey, K. M. (1963). Prasad, Bisheshwar (ed.). East African Campaign, 1940–41. Official History of the Indian Armed Forces In the Second World War (1939–1945) (online ed.). Delhi: Combined Inter-Services Historical Section (India & Pakistan). OCLC 480344871.
- Shores, C. (1996). Dust Clouds in the Middle East: The Air War for East Africa, Iran, Syria, Iran and Madagascar, 1940–42. London: Grub Street. ISBN 978-1-898697-37-4.
