= Battle of Kassala (1940) =

1940 battle of East African Campaign of WWII

- Part of Northern front, East Africa, 1940
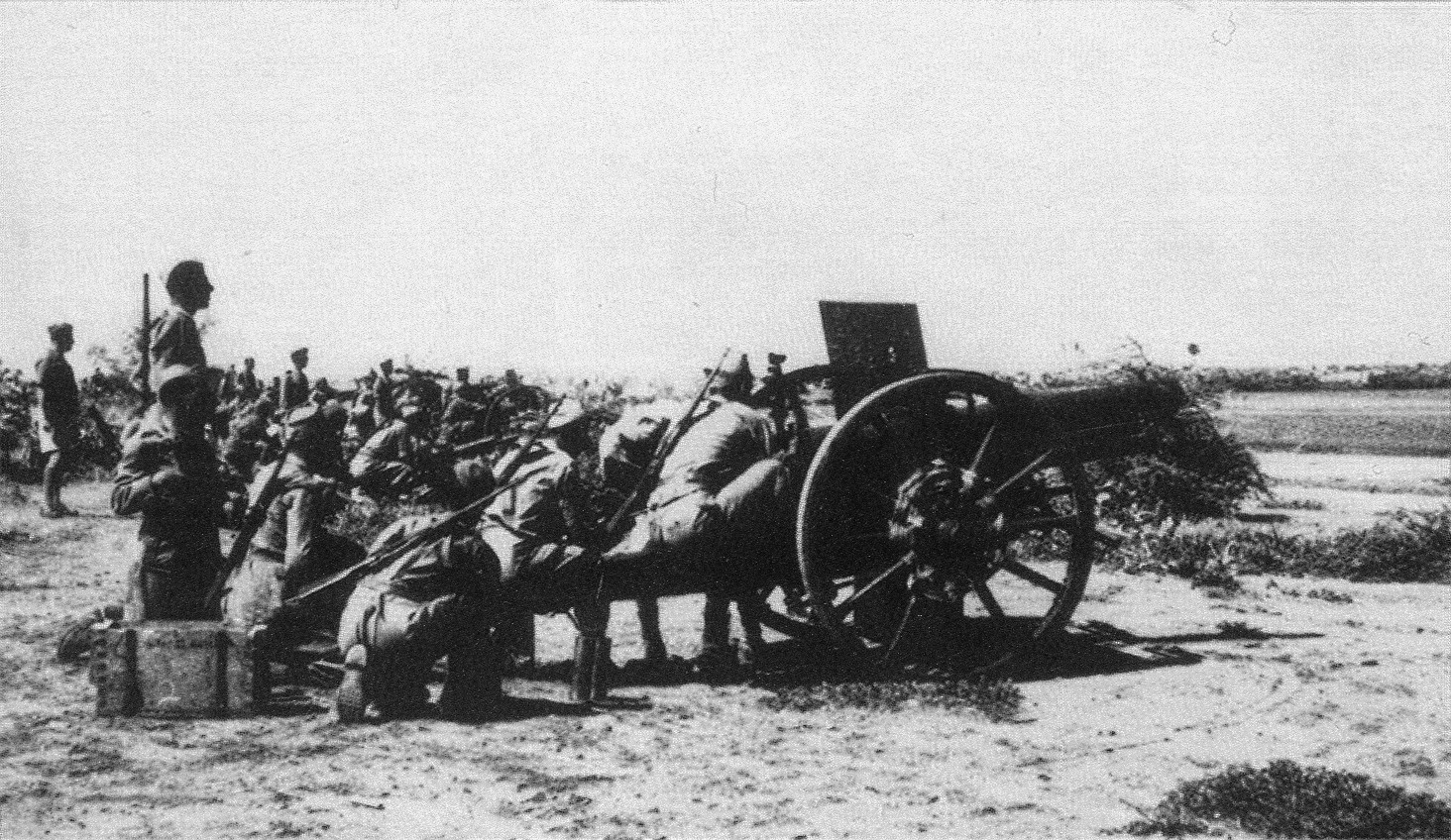
- Italian artillery in action during the Battle of Kassala
Date	4 July 1940
Location	Kassala, Sudan 15°27′N 36°24′E
Result	Italian victory
Territorial changes	A six month occupation by Italian forces, then retaken by the British

Belligerents
Kingdom of Italy; Italian East Africa	British Empire

Commanders and leaders
Prince Amedeo, Duke of Aosta; Luigi Frusci	Alan Cunningham; William Platt

Units involved
2 colonial infantry brigades; four squadrons of cavalry; air, artillery and armoured support	No.3 and No.5 Motor Machine-Gun Companies and No. 6 Mounted Infantry Company, Sudan Defence Force; Local police

Strength
6,300 infantry and cavalry, plus support; 8,000 in total	500

Casualties and losses
117	10

The Battle of Kassala was fought in Anglo-Egyptian Sudan around Kassala, in World War II on 4 July 1940, between an Italian force and a much smaller British/Sudanese garrison of soldiers and policemen. Both sides deployed large numbers of colonial troops. The battle, a relatively small action by the standards of World War II, occurred during the opening stages of the East African campaign. The Italians wanted to capture Kassala, a town near the frontier between Eritrea and Sudan, to strengthen the border defences of Italian East Africa.

East Africa was an area for colonial expansion for Italy, particularly in the 1930s, which had caused tension with Great Britain. With the outbreak of war on 10 June 1940, the British viewed protecting the Suez Canal as their primary objective in the region, and considered the Italian army in Libya as the greatest threat to Egypt. Consequently, defending Sudan was a low priority, and the British commander there, General Platt, had a small army, and chose to concentrate his best-equipped units in key cities, leaving the frontier with Italian East Africa thinly guarded. However, despite being outnumbered, Anglo-Sudanese soldiers on the border took the initiative, and began patrolling and raiding. In July, the Italians launched a limited offensive to capture several border towns in Sudan, including Kassala, to improve their strategic position on the frontier.

The attacking Italian columns that converged on Kassala on 4 July included infantry, cavalry and armour, with air and artillery support. The town's Anglo-Sudanese garrison was greatly outnumbered and had no artillery or air support, but put up a spirited defence before retreating, having inflicted far more casualties than it sustained. Kassala was occupied by Italy for six months, during which Italian and British Commonwealth troops skirmished in the surrounding countryside. In January 1941, in the face of an imminent British offensive, the Italians performed a strategic withdrawal to a defensive line in Eritrea which led to Kassala being abandoned and retaken by British Indian soldiers.

== Background ==
Fascist Italy, under the dictatorship of Benito Mussolini, invaded Ethiopia in the Second Italo-Ethiopian War (1935−1936) then merged it with the neighbouring Italian colonies of Italian Eritrea and Italian Somaliland. As diplomatic relations between Italy and Britain worsened in the late 1930s, the new and enlarged colony of Italian East Africa (Africa Orientale Italiana, AOI) represented a threat to several British-controlled territories and lines of communication. Egypt, a nominally independent Kingdom but a British client state, was a strategically-valuable base for Britain, particularly because of the Suez Canal. Libya, where Mussolini had a large army, was the most likely springboard for an invasion of Egypt by Italy.

For the British, the wide expanses, difficult terrain and inadequate roads (which were mostly impassable in the rainy season) of Sudan provided a useful defensive buffer between Egypt and the AOI, allowing Britain to concentrate on the threat in Libya. From Rome's perspective, Italy's lands in East Africa were isolated, with British colonies to the west (Sudan), north-east (British Somaliland) and south (Kenya). The AOI also bordered French Somaliland and France was allied with Britain. Adding to the Italian sense of insecurity was the Arbegnoch insurgency in Ethiopia, which meant that while the Italians appeared numerically strong in manpower, many troops were busy suppressing rebels.

In November 1939, a plan was produced for an invasion of north-west Sudan but it was only to be implemented if enough resources were available and internal security was sufficient in the AOI; French Somaliland had to be captured first. There were doubts whether the invading army could be adequately supplied. While the conditions for the offensive had not been achieved in summer 1940, planning had drawn attention to the value of Kassala as a possible starting point for an attack into Sudan. Also, Kassala was on a railway running to Port Sudan, making the town a possible location for the British to launch a future invasion of the AOI.

== Prelude ==
=== Italian East Africa at the outbreak of war ===
Map of Italian East Africa, its regions, and neighbouring colonies, in May 1940.

Italy entered World War II on 10 June 1940. Its territories in East Africa were cut off from Italy and Libya, making supply and reinforcement impossible. Mussolini had intended a defensive strategy in East Africa with tactical offensives to protect Eritrea by attacking British and French Somaliland (now Djibouti) and conducting limited attacks on Sudan. The Italian army in East Africa consisted of seven understrength colonial divisions, plus one metropolitan division, the equivalent of two European divisions, which was short of heavy weapons and transport. The Red Sea Flotilla of the Regia Marina comprised destroyers and submarines at Massawa that posed a threat to British shipping traversing the Red Sea, which was vital for reinforcing the British garrison in Egypt. The French Armistice of 22 June 1940 left Britain facing Italy alone in the Mediterranean and Africa.

=== Sudan ===
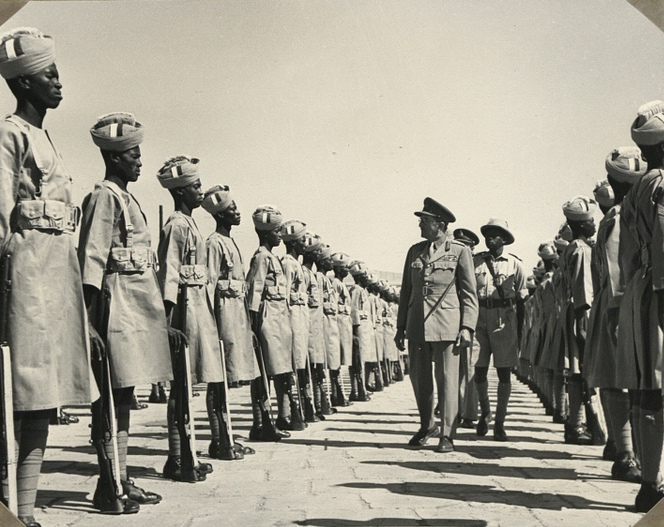
Inspection of a Sudan Defence Force honour guard (undated photo)

The British Commander-in-Chief in Sudan, General William Platt, had three British regular army battalions (around 2,500 men) plus 4,500 troops of the Sudan Defence Force (SDF) a uniformed colonial force led by British and Sudanese officers. The SDF was primarily an internal security unit but just before the war it had been expanded and made ready for combat against a military opponent. Some SDF companies had been motorised, with lorries that carried light machine guns and units were equipped with mortars and anti-tank rifles. They also had a few locally improvised armoured cars built using Ford trucks. SDF artillery were training at the time of the Battle of Kassala and not ready for combat.

Platt deployed his forces with the SDF (supported by local police and irregular scouts) on the border and the regular army battalions in the cities of Atbara and Khartoum in the interior, and Port Sudan on the Red Sea coast. This strategy prioritised guarding the major cities, which were critical to Platt's lines of communication, but maintained a forward presence at the border to monitor and harass the Italians. However, the cities were too far from the frontier for their garrisons to quickly reinforce the SDF. Since the outbreak of war, the SDF had patrolled and raided the Italians and were growing in confidence.

== Battle ==
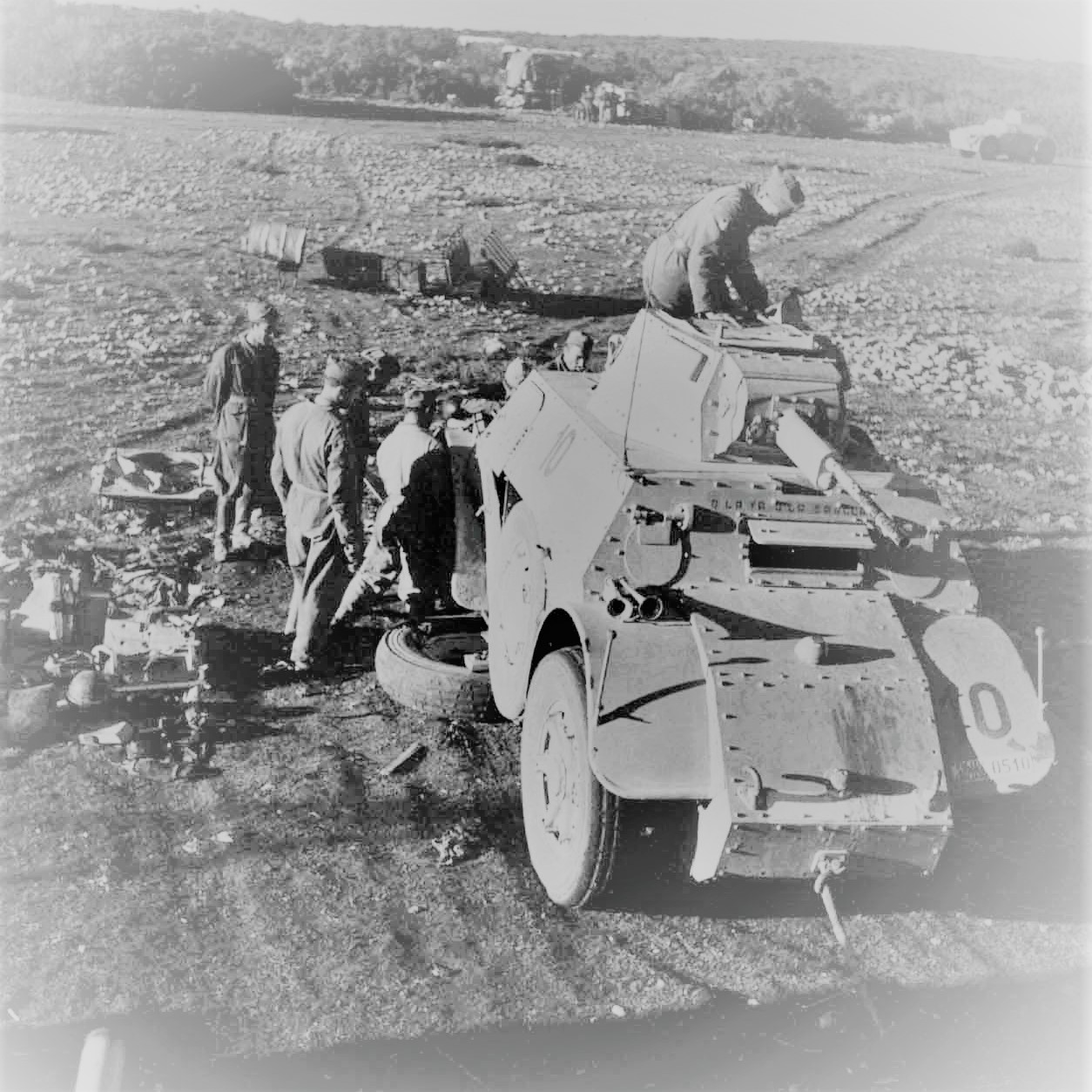
Italians in East Africa repairing an armoured car

Despite adopting a defensive strategy in East Africa, the Italians were interested in acquiring Kassala, to strengthen their frontier defences. It was also hoped taking Kassala would boost morale among Italian troops, and impress the native population. The rainy season was approaching, and once the rains began offensive operations would be ruled out until the end of September, due to the lack of paved roads, creating a time pressure on the Italians to act. An Italian force was assembled near the Sudan border tasked with taking Kassala. The British were aware of its presence and had considered a pre-emptive strike, but this was prevented by poor wireless communication.

General Luigi Frusci planned the Italian attacks on the Sudan frontier in 1940, including at Kassala

The operation against Kassala was planned and led by the governor of Eritrea and Amhara, General Luigi Frusci, assisted by General Vincenzo Tessitori. Advancing on Kassala were two colonial infantry brigades, four squadrons of cavalry, approximately 24 armoured vehicles (a mix of light tanks, medium tanks and armoured cars) and ten batteries of artillery. Many of the troops were Askari in Italian service. Starting out from Teseney (an Eritrean town to the south east of Kassala), the Italian force was divided into three columns, one of which approached Kassala from the east (consisting mainly of cavalry), while the other two advanced on either side of the Gash River.

Kassala had a garrison of around 500 men of the SDF and the local police, with no artillery support or armoured vehicles. The SDF force consisted of two motorised infantry companies, and one mounted infantry company. The action began with an air raid by the Regia Aeronautica, then at 06:30 hours Italian cavalry arrived and engaged the defenders. The fighting took place outside of the town. SDF troops in lorries with machine guns carried out hit-and-run attacks on the flanks and tails of the Italian columns. Despite being outnumbered and having no artillery or air support, the SDF and police put up a spirited defence that inflicted significantly more casualties on the attackers than they suffered themselves. After an action Pitt described as "brisk but short-lived", the defenders withdrew from Kassala and reassembled at the next stop on the railway line, Butana Bridge.

Poor intelligence had led the Italians to believe an additional 3,000 British troops were in the vicinity, causing them to accept casualties to take Kassala quickly, as they feared reinforcements might arrive to aid the defenders if the battle became drawn-out. The battle coincided with the Italians capturing the lightly defended settlements of Gallabat and Karora on the Sudan–AOI border. On 7 July, the Italians took another border town, Kurmuk, which was defended by 60 Sudanese policemen.

=== Subsequent operations ===
The Italians had hoped to find anti-British feeling amongst the local Sudanese population, but during the six month occupation Kassala residents passed intelligence to the British. The Italians advanced no further into Sudan, but they had strengthened their defensive perimeter and gained tactical advantages from their limited offensive. The Italian garrison at Kassala was then reinforced, growing to 13,500 soldiers, 60 artillery guns, and 30 light and medium tanks.

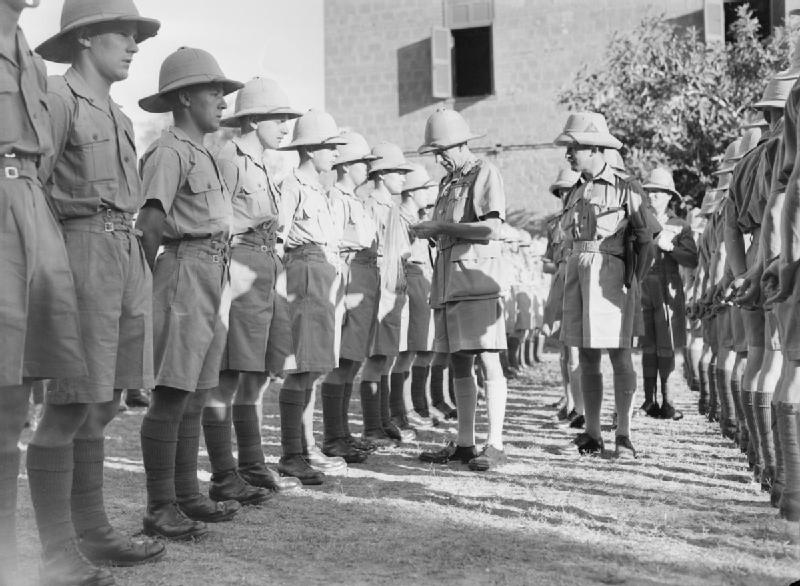
General William Platt inspects British troops

A company of the 2nd Battalion West Yorkshire Regiment was sent to reinforce and act as a reserve for the SDF, who continued patrolling and harassing the Italians. From September 1940, Platt began to receive substantial reinforcements, with the arrival of the 5th Indian Infantry division, a mixed squadron of light and cruiser tanks, an artillery regiment and a troop of anti-tank guns. Also, an Indian battalion was sent from Aden. By the end of October, the British strength in Sudan had risen to 28,000 troops. The 4th Indian Infantry division began deploying in Sudan from late December onwards. Accompanying the 4th Indian division was a squadron of heavily armoured Matilda II tanks from 4th Royal Tank Regiment.

On 16 October 1940, Gazelle Force, a motorised reconnaissance and raiding unit, equipped with lorries, Universal Carriers and improvised armoured cars was formed from units of the SDF and 5th Indian Division. It was commanded by Colonel Frank Messervy, was roughly the size of a brigade and had its own artillery support, field hospital and a workshop section. It had a dual role of patrolling deep into Italian territory but in the event of a new offensive into Sudan was to delay its advance.

In September and October 1940, the Viceroy of Italian East Africa, Prince Amedeo, responded to reports of Gazelle Force raiding around Kassala by ordering Frusci to be less passive. This resulted in an Italian colonial battalion being sent on 1 November into the backcountry north east of Kassala where it was surrounded and attacked by Gazelle Force; who also assaulted and divided into two a guarded supply column. After several days of sporadic fighting, the British attacks were repelled and in the early evening of 11 November, Gazelle Force began a withdrawal that had completed by 01:00 hours on 12 November, with Italian reinforcements arriving later that day. The action had demonstrated how extensively infiltrated the territory around Kassala had become.

By late 1940, the Royal Air Force (RAF) in East Africa began receiving Hurricane fighters, which greatly strengthened the British position in the air. On 6 December, the RAF carried out a raid on a concentration area for Italian vehicles north of Kassala, which also saw nearby Blackshirt and colonial troops strafed. Gazelle Force raids on supply transports bound for Kassala in November and December prompted Frusci to consider withdrawing to a position whose lines of communication were easier to protect.

=== Recapture of Kassala ===
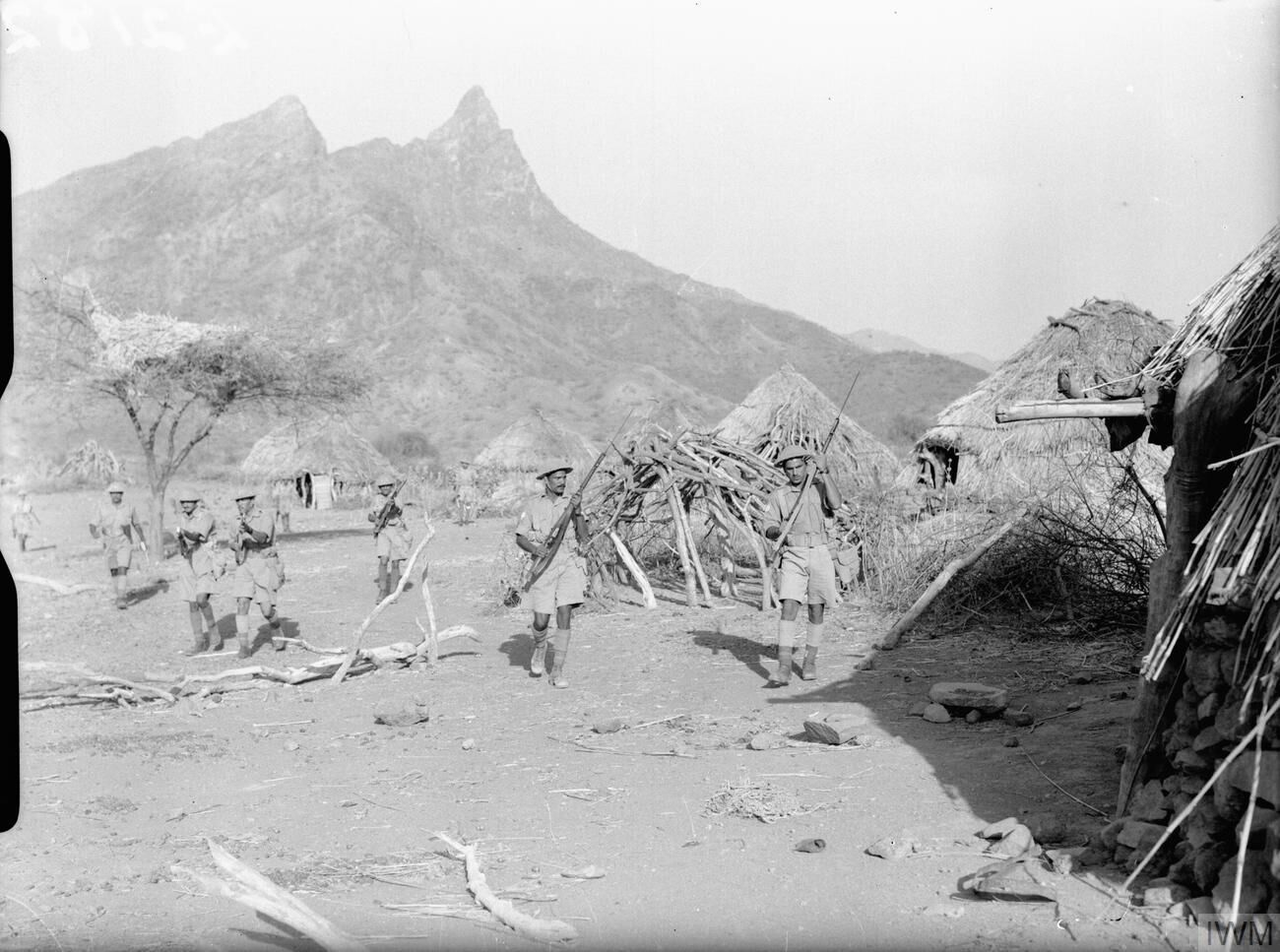
Indian troops clearing a village in Eritrea, 1941.

By January 1941, the British had reinforced the Sudan frontier with modern equipment, regular troops, tanks and adequate air support. With the defeat of the Italian invasion of Egypt and the British invasion of Cyrenaica (eastern Libya) during Operation Compass (9 December 1940 to 9 February 1941) the British commander-in-chief in the Middle East, General Wavell could shift his attention to East Africa, and permanently remove the threat to his lines communication posed by the AOI. It was clear to the Italian army in the AOI that a British offensive was imminent, with Kassala a likely early objective. The Italians began gradually withdrawing troops from the frontier, including Kassala, to a defensive line inside Eritrea.

On 19 January 1941, British Indian troops entered Kassala to find the Italians had already left. Gallabat was similarly abandoned by the Italians on the night of 31 January / 1 February, while Karora was recaptured on 9 February. This was followed by an invasion of Eritrea by the 4th Indian Infantry Division, 5th Indian Infantry Division and Gazelle Force, with Asmara (the capital of Eritrea) falling on 1 April and Massawa, with its Red Sea naval base, taken on 8 April. The AOI also faced a coinciding British Commonwealth invasion from Kenya into Italian Somaliland. An amphibious landing retook the capital of British Somaliland, Berbera, in March. The Allied victory at the Battle of Gondar (13–27 November) marked the end of the East African Campaign.

== See also ==
- Italian invasion of British Somaliland
- Mediterranean and Middle East theatre of World War II
- Military history of Italy during World War II
- Northern front, East Africa, 1940
