= Gideon Force =

1940–1941 military unit active in East Africa

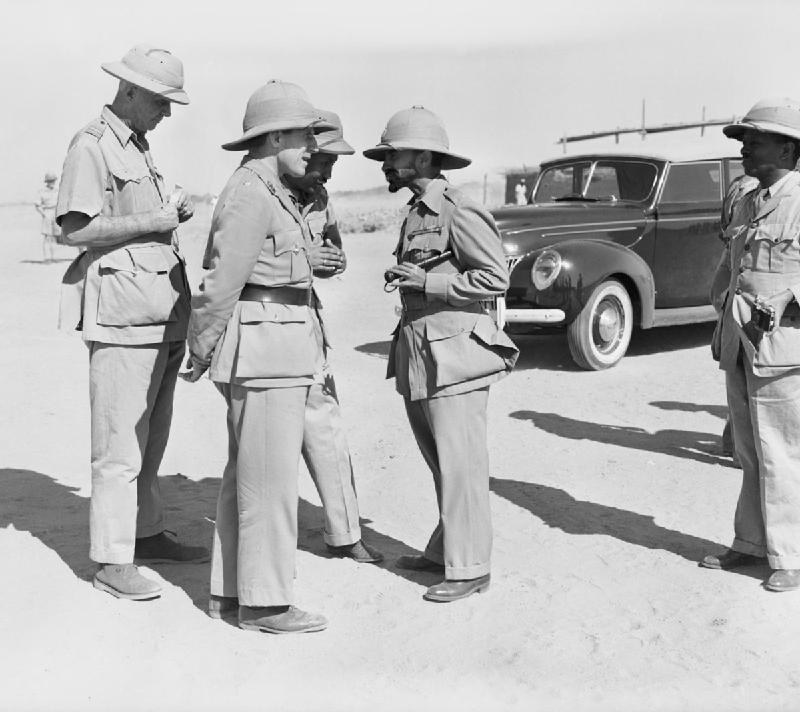
- Orde Wingate, the Gideon Force commander, talking with Emperor Haile Selassie of Ethiopia
- Active: 1940–1941
- Disbanded: 1 June 1941
- Countries: Britain, Sudan, Ethiopia
- Branch: Army
- Type: Infantry; Special Operations
- Role: Irregular warfare

Commanders
- Notable commanders: Orde Wingate

Gideon Force was a small British and African special force, a Corps d'Élite with the Sudan Defence Force, Ethiopian regular forces and Arbegnoch (Amharic for Patriots) and a group of veterans of the Haganah, Special Night Squads (SNS). Gideon Force fought the Italian occupation in Ethiopia, during the East African Campaign of the Second World War. The leader and creator of the force was Major (later Colonel) Orde Wingate. At its peak, Gideon Force had fifty officers, twenty British NCOs, 800 trained Sudanese troops and 800 part-trained Ethiopian regulars, a few mortars but no artillery and no air support, except for intermittent bombing sorties by the Royal Air Force.

The force operated in difficult country at the end of a long, tenuous supply-line, on which perished nearly all of the 15,000 camels used as beasts of burden. Gideon Force and the Arbegnoch ejected the Italian forces commanded in Ethiopia by General Guglielmo Nasi (the conqueror of British Somaliland). The campaign took six weeks; 1,100 Italian and 14,500 Ethiopian troops were captured along with twelve guns, many machine-guns, rifles, much ammunition and over 200 pack animals. Gideon Force was disbanded on 1 June 1941, Wingate resumed this substantive rank of Major and returned to Egypt, as did many of the troops of Gideon Force, who joined the Long Range Desert Group (LRDG) in the Eighth Army.

== Background ==
=== Italian East Africa ===
During the First Italo-Abyssinian War (1895–1896), the Royal Italian Army (Regio Esercito) had been defeated by the forces of Emperor Menelik II of Ethiopia at the Battle of Adowa. During the Second Italo-Abyssinian War in October 1935, the Italians invaded Ethiopia from Italian Somaliland and Eritrea. On 9 May 1936, the Italian dictator, Benito Mussolini, proclaimed Italian East Africa (Africa Orientale Italiana, AOI), formed from the newly conquered Ethiopia and the colonies of Italian Eritrea and Italian Somaliland. On 10 June 1940, Mussolini declared war on Britain and France, making the AOI a threat to the British supply route along the Red Sea and the Suez Canal. The Kingdom of Egypt remained neutral during the war but the Anglo-Egyptian Treaty of 1936 allowed the British to occupy Egypt to defend the Suez Canal. Egypt included the Sudan as a condominium known as Anglo-Egyptian Sudan. Egypt, the Suez Canal, French Somaliland and British Somaliland were vulnerable to an Italian invasion but Mussolini looked forward to propaganda triumphs in the Sudan and British East Africa (Kenya, Tanganyika and Uganda). Comando Supremo (the Italian General Staff) had planned for a war after 1942 and in the summer of 1940 was not prepared for a long war or the occupation large parts of Africa.

=== Middle East Command ===
The British had based forces in Egypt since 1882 but these were greatly reduced by the terms of the treaty of 1936. A small British and Commonwealth force garrisoned the Suez Canal and the Red Sea route, which was vital to British communications with its Indian Ocean and Far Eastern territories. In mid-1939, Lieutenant-General Archibald Wavell was appointed General Officer Commanding-in-Chief (GOC-in-C) of the new Middle East Command, over the Mediterranean and Middle East. Until the Franco–German Armistice of 22 June 1940, French divisions in Tunisia faced the Italian 5th Army on the western Libyan border. In Libya, the Italian Army had about 215,000 men and in Egypt, the British had about 36,000 troops, with another 27,500 men training in Palestine. Wavell had about 86,000 troops at his disposal for Libya, Iraq, Syria, Iran and East Africa, whose frontiers were guarded by an average of about eight men to 1 mi (1.6 km).

Wavell resolved to conduct the delaying actions recommended in Operations against Italian East Africa by his Operations Section of August 1940. Pressure was to be maintained everywhere to make the Italians exhaust their resources, a limited offensive in Sudan was to be conducted at Kassala and an advance was to be made on Kisimayu by January or February 1941. The Foreign Secretary Anthony Eden convened a conference in Khartoum at the end of October 1940, with the Ethiopian emperor Haile Selassie and others. Attempts would be made to encourage unrest among local civilians, particularly in Ethiopia, where Mission 101 had crossed the frontier on 12 August and the inclusion Ethiopian irregular forces was agreed upon at the conference. In November 1940, the British and Commonwealth forces gained an intelligence advantage when the Government Code and Cypher School (GC & CS) at Bletchley Park broke the high grade cypher of the Regio Esercito in East Africa. Later that month, the replacement cypher for the Italian Air Force (Regia Aeronautica) was broken by the Combined Bureau, Middle East (CBME).

==== Mission 101 ====
The AOI (1938–1941)

In August 1939, Wavell had ordered a plan covertly to encourage the rebellion in the western Ethiopian province of Gojjam, that the Italians had never been able to repress. In September, Colonel Daniel Sandford arrived to run the project but until the Italian declaration of war, the conspiracy was held back by the policy of appeasement. (Note: Sandford had fifteen years' experience of Ethiopia and was a friend of Selassie.) Mission 101 (named after the No. 101 fuze) was a force composed of British, Sudanese and Ethiopian soldiers formed to co-ordinate the activities of the Ethiopian resistance. In June 1940, Selassie arrived in Egypt and in July, went to Sudan to meet Platt and discuss plans to re-capture Ethiopia, despite Platt's reservations.

In July, the British recognised Selassie as emperor and in August, Mission 101 entered Gojjam province to reconnoitre. Sandford requested that supply routes be established before the rains ended, to the area north of Lake Tana and that Selassie should return in October, as a catalyst for the uprising. Gaining control of Gojjam required the Italian garrisons to be isolated along the main road from Bahrdar Giorgis south of Lake Tana, to Dangila, Debre Marqos and Addis Ababa, to prevent them concentrating against the Arbegnoch. Italian reinforcements arrived in October and patrolled more frequently, just as dissensions among local potentates were reconciled by Sandford's diplomacy.

The Frontier Battalion of the Sudan Defence Force, established in May 1940, was joined at Khartoum by the 2nd Ethiopian and 4th Eritrean battalions, raised from émigré volunteers in Kenya. Operational Centres of an officer, five NCOs and several Ethiopian troops, were formed and trained in guerrilla warfare, to provide leadership cadres; £1 million was set aside to finance operations. Major Orde Wingate was sent to Khartoum with an assistant to join the HQ of the SDF. On 20 November, Wingate was flown to Sakhala to meet Sandford and the RAF managed to bomb Dangila, drop propaganda leaflets and supply Mission 101, which raised Ethiopian morale, having suffered much from Italian air power since the Second Italo-Abyssinian War. Mission 101 managed to persuade the Arbegnogh north of Lake Tana to spring several ambushes on the Metemma–Gondar road and the Italian garrison at Wolkait was withdrawn in February 1941.

== Prelude ==
=== British plans, Gideon Force ===
Platt planned to take a stronghold in Gojjam, install Selassie and then expand the revolt. The Frontier Battalion was to capture Belaya, 70 mi (110 km) over the border as an advanced base for the Operational Centres moving into the province. Sandford was to send recruits to Belaya and collect 3,000 mules to add to camels from Sudan for transport and Selassie was to move to Belaya as soon as possible. The Italians retaliated by returning Ras Hailu to Gojjam, where he had great prestige, to weaken the Arbegnoch. By January 1941, the Frontier Battalion had made two routes to Belaya and delivered stores but Sandford had failed to provide the mules, thought essential for climbing the escarpment if camels proved unsuitable. Only two Operational Centres were ready and Ethiopian nobles had been reluctant to provide recruits. On 21 January, just after the Italian retirement from Kassala, Selassie crossed into Ethiopia and reached Belaya. Sandford was promoted to act as liaison between Selassie, Wavell, Platt and Cunningham, Wingate took over Mission 101 and in February, the Frontier Battalion SDF, 2nd Ethiopian Battalion and Nos 1 and 2 Operational Centres along with several Haganah, Special Night Squads veterans, were renamed Gideon Force. Wingate was ordered to capture Dangila and Bure, which had garrisons of a colonial brigade each and to gain control of the road to Bahrdar Giorgis, to provide a base for Selassie. The Arbegnoch were to attack the main roads from Gondar and Addis Ababa and keep as many Italian troops back defending Addis Ababa as possible. (Note: In the 1987 edition of Hailie Selassie's war, Anthony Mockler wrote that Gideon Force comprised "a few hundred impoverished nobles...a few hundred Sudanese soldiers with their amateurish British Officers. A little group of Kenya settlers, five Australians, a handful of Jews and several eager young cavalry subalterns". The force was accompanied by the reporters Leonard Mosley, the US writer Stevens, Laurens van der Post and Wilfred Thesiger.)

== Battle ==
=== Gojjam province ===
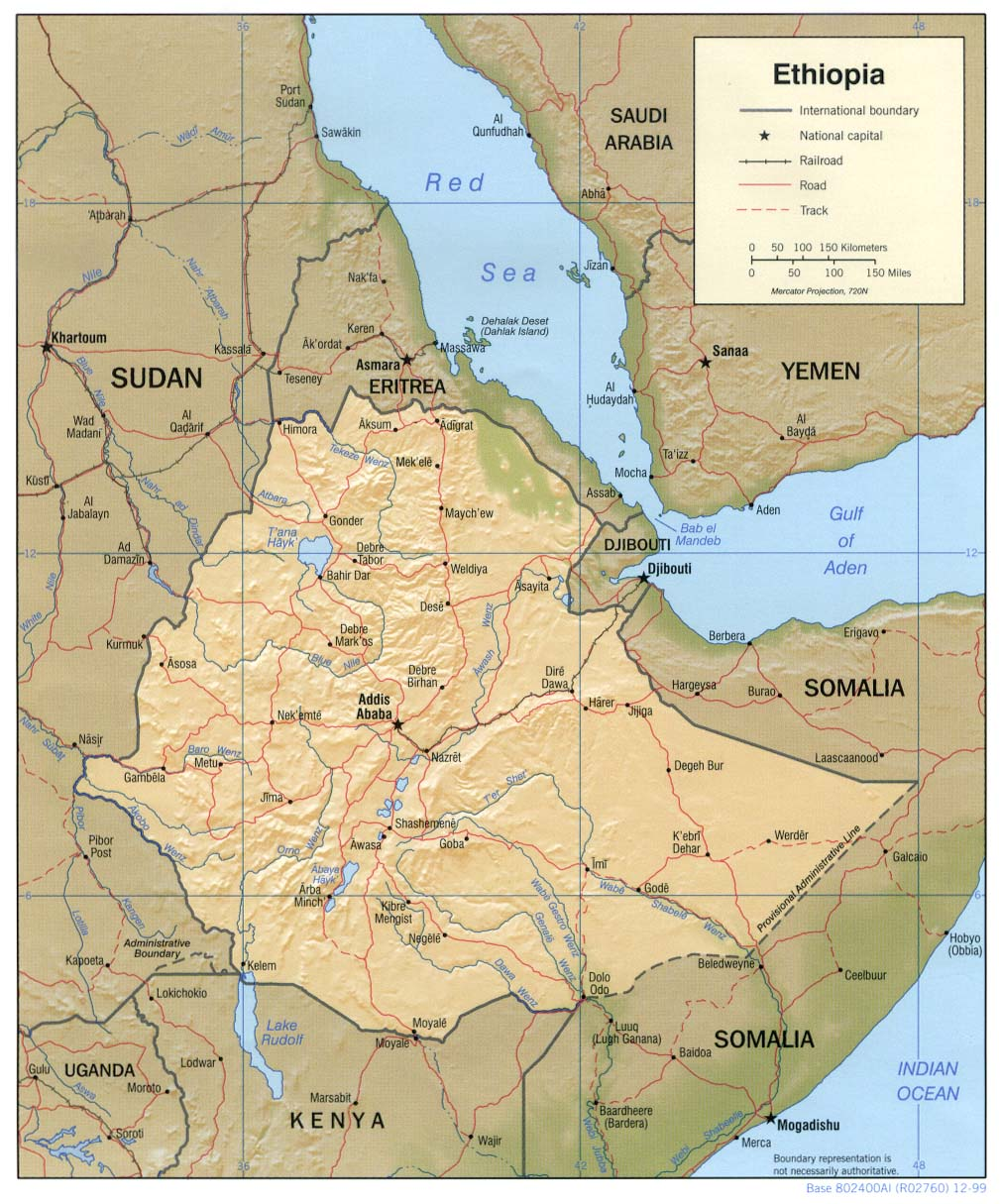
Modern map of Ethiopia

After Italian defeats in the Balkans and North Africa, exaggerated reports of British and Ethiopian troops operating from Sudan and increasing hostility from the Ethiopian population, a retirement by the Italians from western Gojjam, to Bahrdar Giorgis and Debre Marqos appeared imminent. A retreat would free the road needed by Gideon Force and on 19 February, the force reached Matakal, by a route which was found passable by the camel trains. Selassie and Gideon Force rallied Arbegnoch, using loudspeakers to announce the presence of the emperor and induce local notables and Italian Askari to desert. The Dangila garrison had retreated towards Bahrdar Giorgis and Wingate ordered that the remaining garrisons on the road were to be eliminated using guerrilla tactics to magnify the threat perceived by the defenders.

From 27 February to 3 March, Gideon Force harassed the forts at Bure, while propagandists talking through megaphones, fostered the belief that the Italians were being attacked by a substantial force, rather than 450 men, provoking many desertions. On 4 March, fearing that the road to Debre Marqos was threatened Natale retreated for Dembacha on the Debre Marqos road. Pursued by the Frontier Battalion, the Italians ran into the 2nd Ethiopian Battalion west of Dembacha and was overrun after a determined defence, suffering about 400 casualties, 2,000 prisoners, four guns and a quantity of vehicles and supplies. The 2nd Ethiopian Battalion lost 100 casualties and many pack animals, reducing it to the size of a company. The west end of the Gojjam road was freed and Selassie entered Bure on 14 March. The most westerly Italian positions were now at the Debre Marqos forts, which Wingate besieged with the Frontier Battalion and moved the rest of Gideon Force towards the Blue Nile.

Ras Hailu, with several thousand followers appeared, joining the Italians at Debre Marqos, by when Nasi realised that the size of Gideon Force had been exaggerated. Colonel Natale at Markos was sacked and replaced by Colonel Maraventano. Nasi announced that Bure would be reoccupied; re-took Fort Emmanuel and attacked the force at Bahrdar Giorgis. Wingate could retire on his communications towards Bure or attack boldly against the much superior Italian force and chose to go on the offensive. Guerilla attacks were made at night after careful preparation and needed great skill, discipline and dash from the Sudanese troops involved. In the middle of the night, parties of about fifty men crept to within 10 yd (9 m) of a post and attacked with grenades and bayonets. By early April, the defenders had been forced back to the inner defensive ring of Debre Marqos. Aosta ordered a withdrawal and on 4 April, 12,000 people (including 4,000 women), began a 200 mi (322 km) trek to Safartak and then on to Dessie. The attack on Bahrdar Giorgis by Colonel Adriano Torelli, with five infantry battalions with pack artillery also failed. Selassie entered Debre Marqos on 6 April, the same day that Addis Ababa was captured from the south. The British successes in Eritrea, Italian Somaliland and Southern Ethiopia transformed the strategic outlook. British policy became one of re-installing Selassie and mobilising Ethiopian military potential to participate in the reduction of the remaining Italian garrisons.

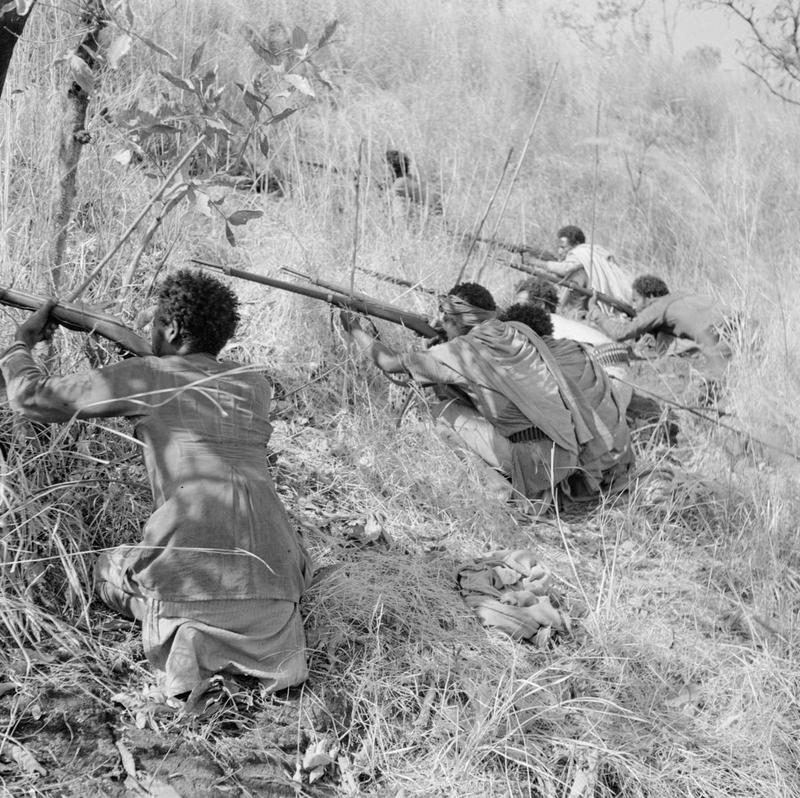
Ethiopian Patriots attacking the Fort of Debra Marcos

Wingate arranged for Lij Belay Zeleke to block a route of retreat from Debre Marqos over the Blue Nile, assisted by Bimbashi Wilfred Thesiger and Captain Foley, with a platoon of the Ethiopian Battalion. Zaleka apparently intrigued with Ras Hailu, remained passive and the Italians got across the Blue Nile, heading for Addis Deraa. Three platoons of the Frontier Battalion and one from the Ethiopian Battalion pursued, despite running out of supplies and ammunition. At the end of April, two Operational Centres arrived to encourage the Arbegnoch and command was taken by Major D. H. Nott of Mission 101. The local population remained reluctant to participate but by guile and bluff, the pursuers kept the Italians disorganised as they ascended the escarpment before Addis Deraa.

An Italian counter-attack was repulsed and a counter-raid inspired the civilian population to help and donate food. On 15 May, Wingate arrived from Addis Ababa on the night that the Italians retreated towards Agibar and the Debra Tabor–Gondar road. Wingate took no notice of orders calling him away and sent part of the force to cut off the Italians, as the main force with another 300 Arbegnoch (Amharic for Patriots) who had arrived, continued the pursuit. On 19 May, Wingate called on Maraventano to surrender, who refused but undertook to consult with HQ by wireless. The Italians attempted another counter-attack and Wingate claimed that his troops were going to leave and that only the Arbegnoch would remain. The ruse worked and Maraventano surrendered with 1,100 Italian and 7,000 Ethiopian troops.

Gideon Force received new orders to cut roads over a wide area to stop the Italians at Amba Alagi, Gondar, Dessie (and Jimma to the south-west) from uniting. Two Operational Centres were sent to Begemdir, east of Lake Tana, to cut the main road through Debra Tabor. The centres managed to spring several ambushes, recruited many more Arbegnoch and kept the Italians inside their fortifications. In late April, the company of the Frontier Battalion at Bahrdar Giorgis repulsed an attack and soon afterwards the Italians retreated along the east side of Lake Tana. Part of the Frontier Battalion remained to watch over Ras Hailu and then went with Selassie to Addis Ababa, joining the 1st South African Brigade advance to Asmara. The rest of the battalion advanced north from Debre Marqos to Lake Tana (in summer uniforms over a 14,000 ft (4,300 m) pass in a blizzard), got to Mota and by an audacious bluff persuaded the last Italian battalion in Gojjam to surrender. On 5 May, Platt handed command of Gideon Force and Arbegnoch operations beyond the curve of the Blue Nile to Cunningham, commander on the Southern Front, where the East African Force had invaded Ethiopia from Italian Somaliland.

== Aftermath ==
=== Analysis ===
At its peak, Gideon Force had fifty officers, twenty British NCOs, 800 trained Sudanese troops and 800 partially trained Ethiopian regulars, a few mortars but no artillery and no air support, except for intermittent bombing sorties. The force operated in difficult country at the end of a long and tenuous supply-line, on which nearly all of the 15,000 camels perished. Assisted by the Arbegnoch, Gideon Force ejected the Italian forces under Nasi in six weeks and captured 1,100 Italian and 14,500 Ethiopian troops, twelve guns, many machine-guns, rifles, ammunition and over 200 pack animals.

=== Subsequent events ===
Gideon Force was disbanded on 1 June 1941, Wingate was demoted to Major and returned to Egypt along with many of the troops of Gideon Force, who joined the Long Range Desert Group (LRDG) of the Eighth Army. Wingate's request for decorations for his men was ignored and his attempts to get back-pay for them was obstructed. Wingate wrote a report on 18 June, to Wavell, in which he outlined the successes of the campaign and his views on future actions of a similar type,

To sum up it is proposed to assemble and employ a force of the highest fighting qualities capable of employment in widely separated columns...that it should be allocated an objective behind the enemy's lines, the gaining of which will decisively affect the campaign; and that to enable it to carry out its task it must be given a political doctrine consonant with our war aims.

Wavell rebuked Wingate for the language of the report and undertook to look into the grievances but was sacked and posted to India soon after. Wingate languished in Cairo, came down with malaria and was sent back to Britain by troop ship, much to the relief of the general staff in Cairo, who had feared that he would meddle in the post-war politics of Ethiopia.

== See also ==
- List of British military equipment of World War II
- List of Second Italo-Ethiopian War weapons of Ethiopia-Arbegnoch used Ethiopian and captured Italian weapons
- List of Italian Army equipment in World War II
- East African Campaign (World War II)
- Gazelle Force - an improvised British Commonwealth reconnaissance and raiding force during the East African Campaign.
- Order of Battle, East African Campaign (World War II)

== Bibliography ==
- Anglim, S. J. (2007). Orde Wingate and the British Army 1922–1944: Military Thought and Practice Compared and Contrasted (PhD). University of Wales, Aberystwyth. OCLC 828579432.
- Barker, A. J. (1971). Rape of Ethiopia, 1936. London: Ballantine Books. ISBN 978-0-345-02462-6.
- Dear, I. C. B.; Foot, M. R. D., eds. (2005) [1995]. Oxford Companion to World War II. New York: Oxford University Press. ISBN 978-0-19-280670-3.
- Mockler, A. (1987) [1984]. Haile Selassie's War (2nd. pbk. Grafton Books, London ed.). London: Oxford University Press. ISBN 0-586-07204-7.
- Playfair, I. S. O.; Stitt, G. M. S.; Molony, C. J. C.; Toomer, S. E. (1959) [1959]. Butler, J. R. M. (ed.). The Mediterranean and Middle East: The Early Successes Against Italy (to May 1941). History of the Second World War, United Kingdom Military Series. Vol. I (3rd impression ed.). HMSO. OCLC 888934805.
- Raugh, H. E. (1993). Wavell in the Middle East, 1939–1941: A Study in Generalship. London: Brassey's. ISBN 0-08-040983-0.
- Rooney, David (1994). Wingate and the Chindits. London: Cassell. ISBN 0-304-35452-X.
- Stewart, A. (2016). The First Victory: The Second World War and the East Africa Campaign (1st ed.). New Haven, CT: Yale University Press. ISBN 978-0-300-20855-9.
