= Gazelle Force =

Improvised British Commonwealth military unit in World War II

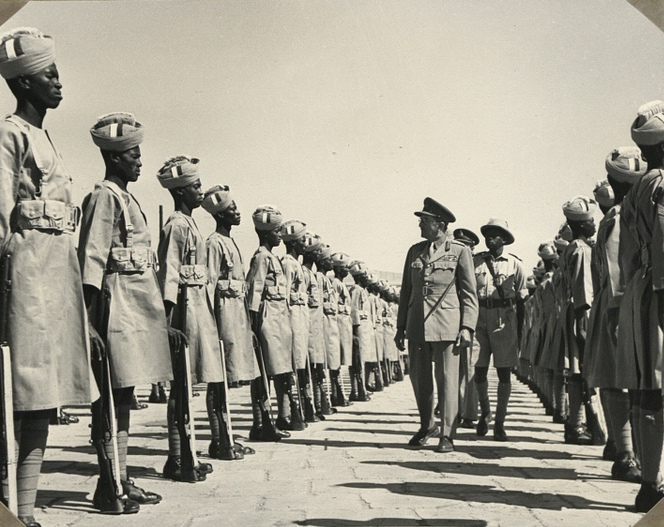
- Inspection of a Sudan Defence Force (SDF) honour guard (undated photo). SDF troops formed a large part of Gazelle Force's combat troops.
- Active: October 1940 – February 1941
- Disbanded: 15 February 1941
- Country: British Empire
- Branch: British Army
- Role: Reconnaissance; Intelligence gathering Raiding operations
- Size: Brigade strength
- Part of: Initially 5th Infantry Division (India); Later 4th Infantry Division (India)
- Equipment: Chevrolet and Ford 15 cwt lorries, Universal Carriers, improvised armoured cars, QF 18-pounder guns, QF 25-pounder guns
- Engagements: Second World War: East African campaign; Battle of Agordat (1941); Battle of Keren

Commanders
- Notable commanders: Colonel (later General) Frank Messervy

Gazelle Force was a short-lived improvised British Commonwealth raiding and reconnaissance force deployed during the East African Campaign in World War II. It comprised units of the Sudan Defence Force and the 5th Indian Infantry Division, and was created on 16 October 1940 as part of a reinforcing of the British garrison in Sudan following an Italian limited offensive in July that captured a number of Sudanese settlements on the border with Italian East Africa (Africa Orientale Italiana, or the AOI), including the strategic town of Kassala.

Initially Gazelle Force was tasked with raiding and scouting Italian army positions, and gathering intelligence. In the event of an invasion deep into Sudan, Gazelle Force was to slow the enemy advance. The formation was brigade-sized and operated deep inside Italian-held territory, interdicting supplies, sabotaging communications and skirmishing. Gazelle Force was fully motorised, operating lorries equipped with light machineguns, Universal Carriers and some improvised armoured cars. It also had its own artillery support and field hospital. Most of the troops were Indians and Sudanese, with a British minority (many of them either officers or Royal Artillery Gunners).

Such was Gazelle Force’s success in infiltrating the countryside around Kassala that the Italians considered withdrawing their garrison.

By January 1941, the British had built up a significant army in Sudan, and were in a position to launch an invasion of Eritrea, a region in the north of the AOI. Gazelle Force was a spearhead unit during the invasion, pursuing retreating Italian units and flanking defensive positions. It fought at the Battle of Agordat and Battle of Keren. However, the countryside around Keren was mountainous, reducing the mobility of Gazelle Force with its many lorries, and the unit was consequently deployed as infantry during the Keren battle. Due to the change in terrain, it was disbanded on 15 February 1941.

== Background ==
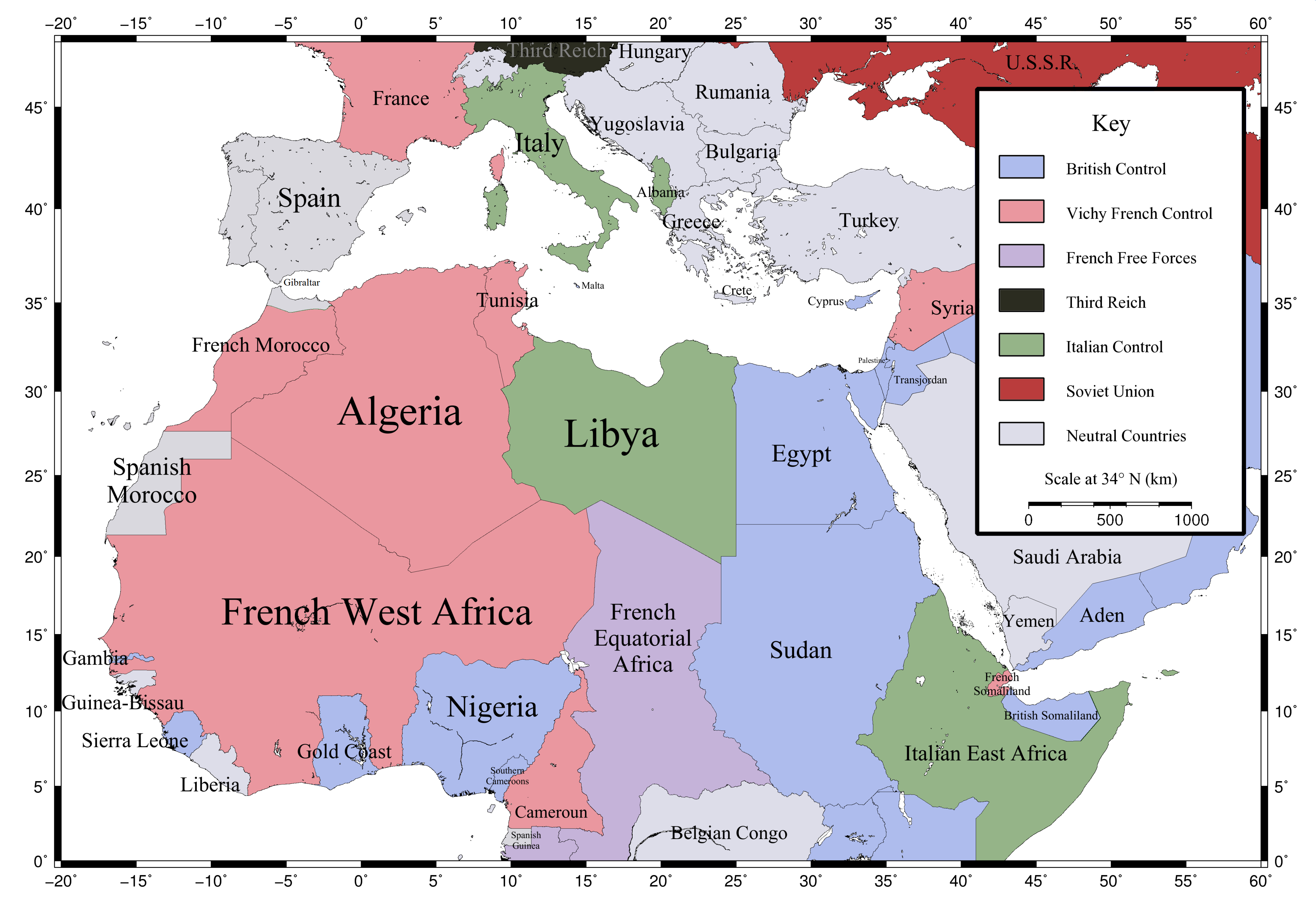
Strategic situation in North and East Africa in June 1940

Italy entered World War II on 10 June 1940, which left the British garrison in Sudan (7,000 troops) in a vulnerable position, as it bordered the large Italian colony of the AOI, which had an army of 256,000 soldiers (plus a further 24,000 irregulars). The disparity in the numbers was overwhelming, although the Italian army in the AOI was also fighting an insurgency in Ethiopia, and was surrounded by British and French colonies, including Kenya to the south, and British Somaliland and French Somaliland to the north, as well as the Aden Protectorate across the Gulf of Aden. So, the AOI faced multiple threats which dispersed their forces over a vast area of 1.7 million square kilometres. The army in the AOI was cut off from Italy, so had no prospect of resupply of arms and ammunition, and there was doubt whether they could adequately supply a force invading deep into Sudan. The AOI's forces were poorly organised, and colonial units lacked heavy weapons. Also, the Italian intelligence service greatly overestimated how many British troops were in Sudan, believing the garrison to be 31,000 strong in June 1940, and British disinformation activities meant the estimates became further exaggerated in the subsequent months.

For the British in Sudan, being so heavily outnumbered by the enemy was a major concern, as was the knowledge that they were initially at the back of the queue for troops and weapons, due to the threat of invasion of Britain itself in 1940 and the priority given by Middle East Command to defending Egypt, especially the Suez Canal. However, geography and climate helped the British defenders, as the vastness of the Sudan, the lack of paved roads and a rainy season (July to September) during which much of the countryside was impassable, added to the problems facing any Italian invasion.

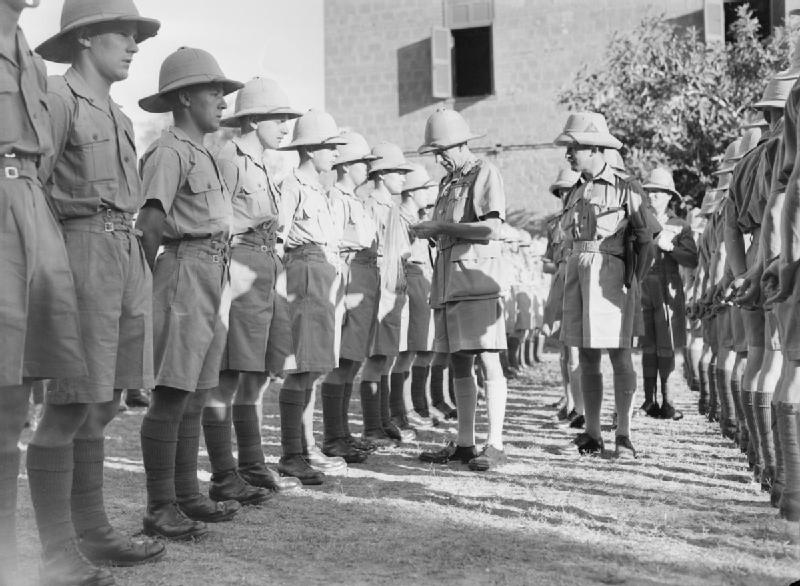
General William Platt inspects British troops

The British commander in Sudan, General William Platt, commanded a force that consisted of three British regular army battalions, and the Sudan Defence Force (SDF). The SDF was a colonial gendarmerie, focussed on internal security, but in the run up to World War II had begun receiving the training necessary to fight a military opponent. Five companies had been mechanised, with lorries that carried light machineguns, and some locally improvised armoured cars were built using Ford trucks. The force had mortars, but an artillery battery equipped with 3.7-inch mountain howitzers (a gun of World War I vintage) was still in training at the time of the outbreak of war with Italy. The three British regular battalions were deployed in Sudan's major cities, which were vital to Platt's lines of communication. However, this meant the best-equipped units were a considerable distance from the frontier with the AOI. The border was thinly manned by the SDF (supported by the local police and irregular scouts), who were tasked with patrolling and raiding.

In Rome, Mussolini decided the AOI's forces should largely follow a defensive strategy, bar an invasion of British Somaliland and limited offensives to seize strategic points on the borders with Sudan and Kenya. Early July 1940 saw Italian troops seize several lightly defended Sudanese border towns, notably with the Battle of Kassala, where 500 SDF troops and local policemen put up a brief but spirited defence then retired in the face a far larger and better equipped attacking force. The arrival of the seasonal rains then turned the countryside into a quagmire, which ruled out further operations until the end of September. The limited offensive achieved its objectives for the Italians of strengthening the AOI's border defences, but also drew British Middle East Command's attention to the need to reinforce Sudan.

== Formation and early operations ==
A company of the 2nd Battalion West Yorkshire Regiment was sent to reinforce and act as a reserve for the SDF, who continued patrolling and harassing the Italians. From September 1940, Platt began to receive substantial reinforcements, with the arrival of the 5th Indian Infantry division, a mixed squadron of light and cruiser tanks, an artillery regiment and a troop of anti-tank guns. Also, an Indian battalion was sent from Aden. By the end of October, the British strength in Sudan had risen to 28,000 troops.

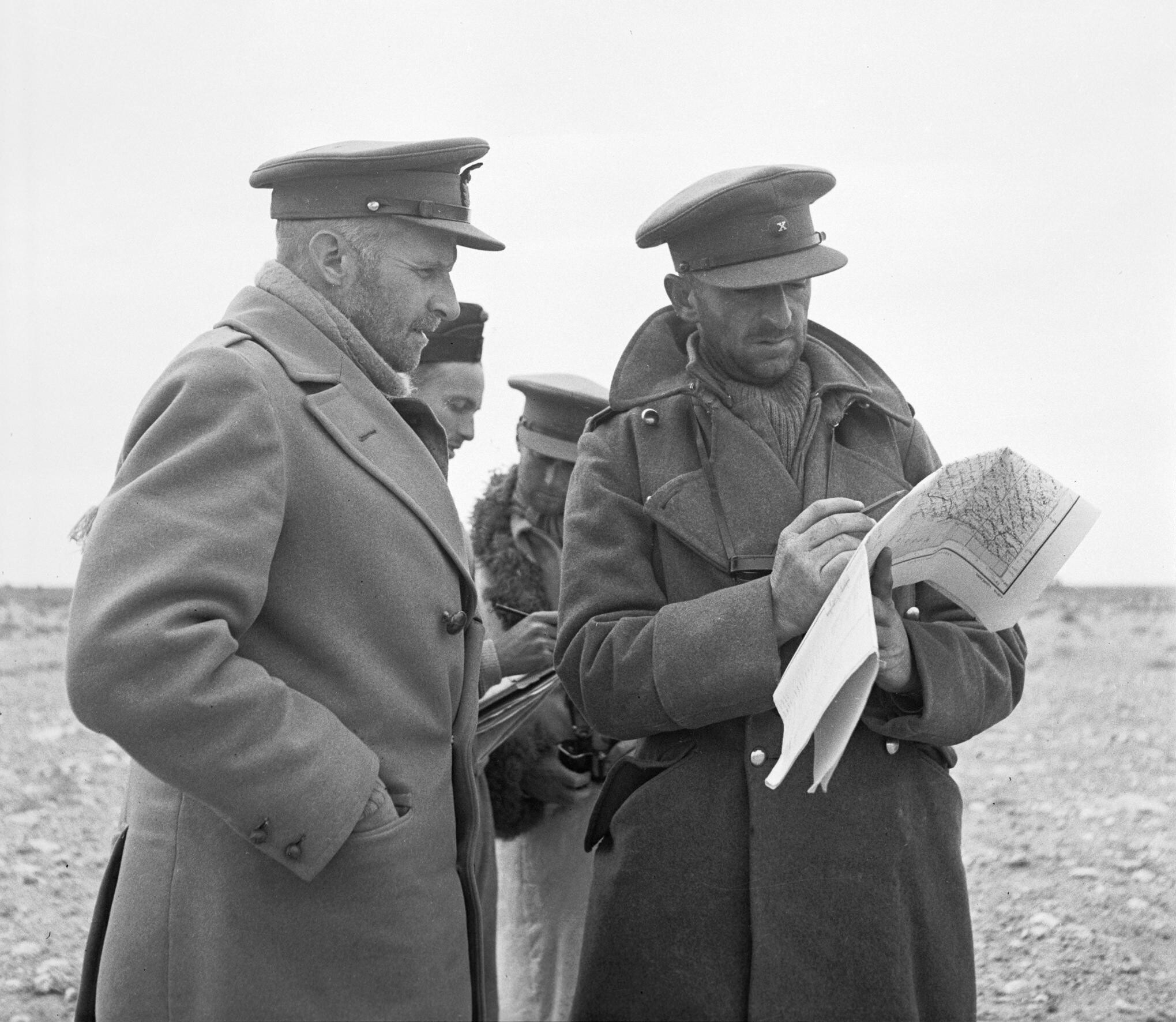
Messervy (left), after the East African Campaign, commanding 4th Indian Division in North Africa.

On 16 October 1940, a motorised reconnaissance and raiding unit, equipped with lorries, Universal Carriers and improvised armoured cars, known as Gazelle Force, was formed from units of the SDF and 5th Indian division. It reported to the headquarters of 5th Indian Division but largely operated independently, and was commanded by Colonel Frank Messervy. Gazelle Force was roughly the size of a brigade, and had its own artillery support, field hospital and a workshop section. It had a dual role of patrolling deep into enemy territory, but in the event of a new Italian offensive into Sudan was to delay its advance. During 1940, Gazelle Force was focussed on raiding around Kassala, particularly to the north of the town and east of the Gash River.

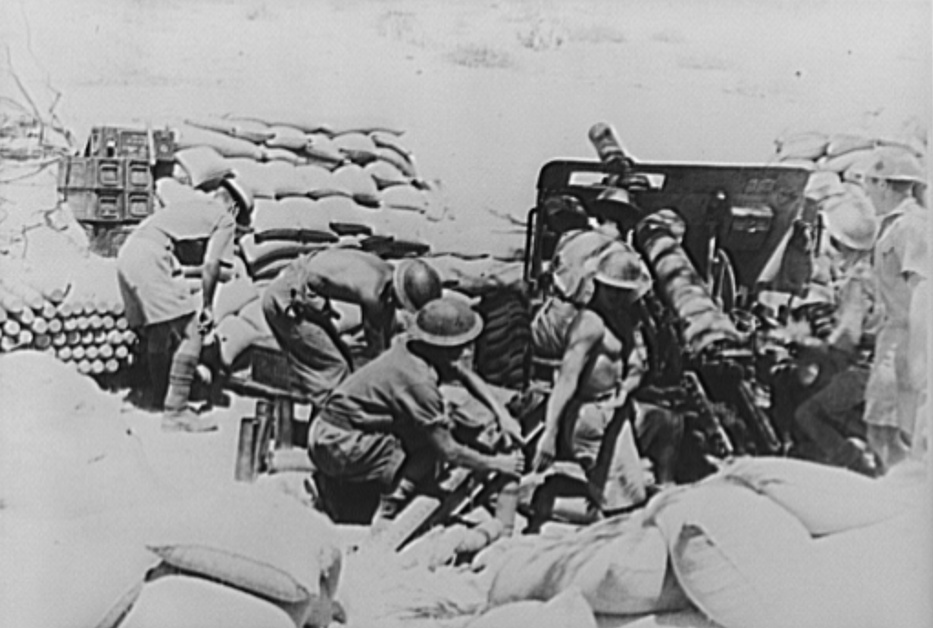
Indian Army 18-pounder field gun in action in the East African Campaign.

Gazelle Force's core units were No. 1 Motor Machine-Gun Group of the Sudan Defence Force (three companies of motorised infantry), 1st Horse (Skinner's Horse), which was attached to 5th Indian Division, and 390th Field Battery of the 144th Field Regiment, Royal Artillery (which replaced a battery of 18-pounders initially assigned to the force). Skinner's Horse was a cavalry regiment with a long and distinguished history in the British Indian Army, counting among its many battle honours: the first and second Afghan wars, first and second Sikh wars, the Boxer Rebellion and the Western Front of World War I. In 1939, it replaced horses with 15 cwt Chevrolet lorries and Universal Carriers in order to operate as a mechanised reconnaissance regiment. The SDF troops operated 15 cwt Ford lorries with mounted machine guns. 390th Field Battery was a British Territorial Army unit, and had recently been equipped with modern 25-pounder field guns. As a Territorial unit, 390th's gunners were before the war part-time volunteer soldiers, many of whom worked as their main occupation in London's 'Square Mile' financial district and legal cluster, so its personnel included many stockbrokers, barristers and architects. Other units were temporarily attached to Gazelle Force over the course of its existence, including the 4th Battalion of the 11th Sikh Regiment.

In September and October 1940, the Viceroy of Italian East Africa, Prince Amedeo, Duke of Aosta, responded to reports of aggressive Gazelle Force raiding around Kassala by ordering the Italian commander in Eritrea, General Luigi Frusci, to be less passive and counterattack. This resulted in an Italian colonial battalion being sent on 1 November into the backcountry north east of Kassala where it was surrounded and attacked by Gazelle Force; who also assaulted and divided into two a guarded supply column. After several days of sporadic fighting, the British attacks were repelled, and in the early evening of 11 November, Gazelle Force began a withdrawal that had completed by 01-00 hours on 12 November, with Italian reinforcements arriving later that day. However, the action had demonstrated how extensively infiltrated the territory around Kassala had become.

Repeated Gazelle Force raids on supply transports bound for Kassala in November and December prompted General Frusci to consider withdrawing the Kassala garrison to a position whose lines of communication were easier to protect.

== Invasion of Eritrea ==
Invasion of Eritrea.

From late December 1940, 4th Indian Infantry division began deploying in Sudan, accompanied by a squadron of heavily armoured Matilda II tanks from 4th Royal Tank Regiment. By January 1941, the British had reinforced the Sudan frontier with modern equipment, regular troops, tanks and adequate air support. With the defeat of the Italian invasion of Egypt and the British invasion of Cyrenaica (eastern Libya) during Operation Compass (9 December 1940 to 9 February 1941) the British commander-in-chief in the Middle East, General Wavell could shift his attention to East Africa, and permanently remove the threat to his lines communication posed by the AOI. It was clear to the Italian army in the AOI that a British offensive was imminent, with Kassala a likely early objective. The Italians began gradually withdrawing troops from the frontier, including Kassala, to a defensive line inside Eritrea. For the upcoming offensive, Gazelle Force was transferred to the command of 4th Indian Division, although it continued to enjoy considerable operational freedom.

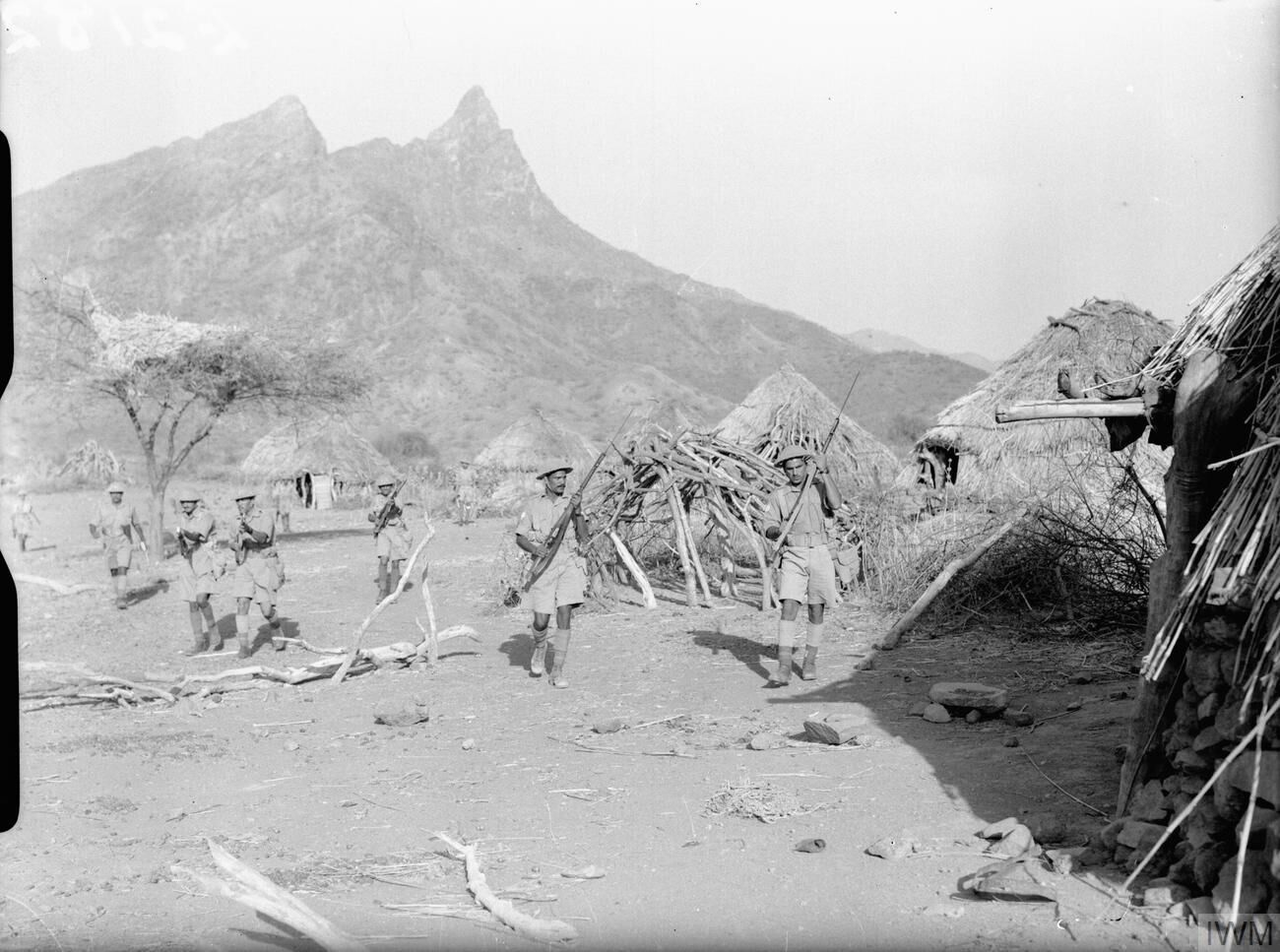
Indian soldiers clear a village in Eritrea.

On 19 January 1941, British Indian troops entered Kassala to find the Italians had already left. This was followed by an invasion of Eritrea by the 4th Indian Infantry Division and 5th Indian Infantry Division. Three columns advanced into Eritrea. One column marched eastwards from Kassala to Agordat, with Gazelle Force scouting ahead. Another column approached Agordat from the south west. A third column recaptured Karora then marched south.

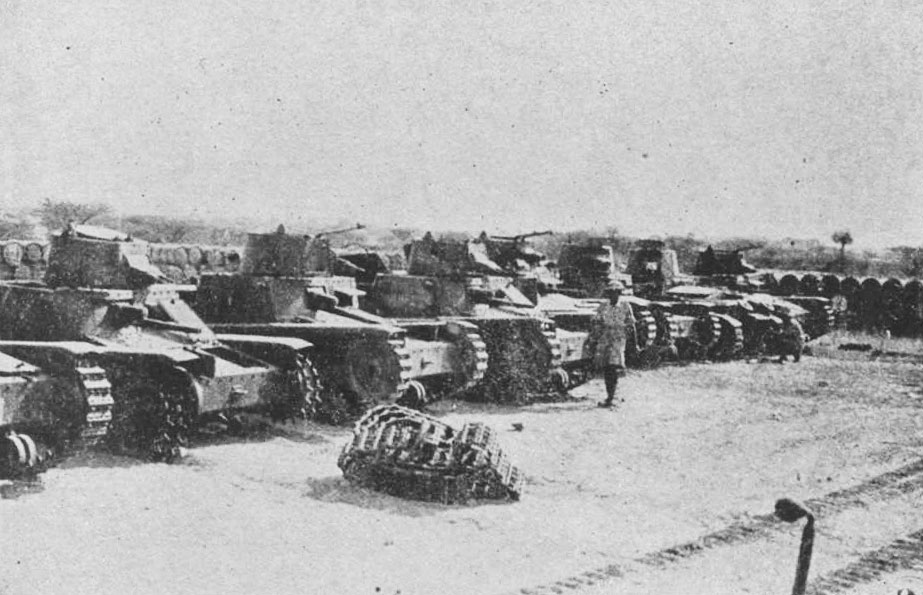
Italian M11/39 tanks captured at Agordat

During the advance, Gazelle Force fought a brief battle with the Italian 41st Colonial Brigade near the village of Keru on 21-22 January 1941, where they found themselves being charged by Askari cavalry. Once the surprise of facing a horseback charge in the 1940s passed, Gazelle Force troops opened fire with field guns, rifles and machineguns. According to Pitt: "within ten minutes it was all over, dead and wounded men and beasts strewn about, dust clouds covering the survivors as they galloped frantically for the shelter of the scrub from which they had so dramatically appeared". Stubborn fighting followed as 4/11th Sikhs (later relieved by the 2nd battalion Queen's Own Cameron Highlanders) engaged enemy troops on high ground. The enemy eventually retreated during the night, abandoning to the British "a formidable defensive position", after finding themselves flanked and under attack from the rear by troops from the Highland Light Infantry. During the 41st Colonial Brigade's withdrawal, 800 Italian colonial troops were taken prisoner, including the Brigade commander and his staff.

The next major objective ahead was Agordat, which had nearby rugged terrain where forts and field defences had been constructed. The Battle of Agordat saw Gazelle Force scout the Italian positions, then 11th Indian Infantry Brigade and 5th Indian Infantry Brigade (the latter supported by Matilda II tanks) assaulted the defensive perimeter facing determined resistance. The town was taken on 1 February when its garrison withdrew on the only road left open to them. Gazelle Force then pursued the retreating Italians to Keren. However, the campaign was now moving into mountainous country, where sappers could quickly block roads and the rugged off-road terrain was unsuited to Gazelle Force’s lorries and armoured cars.

== Battle of Keren and disbandment ==
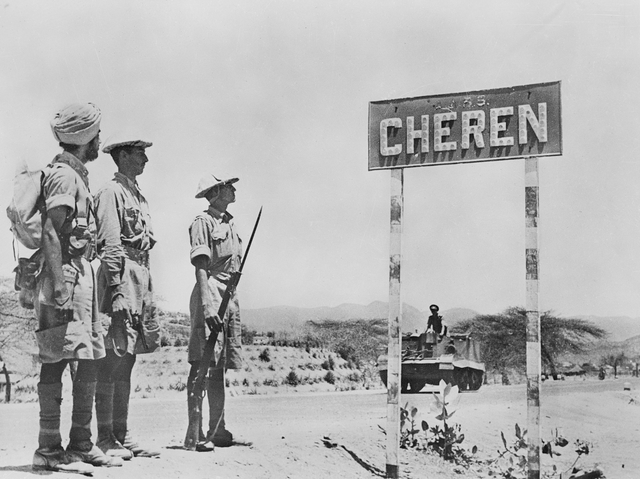
Indian troops inspect Cheren (Keren) signpost

The Battle of Keren began on 3 February 1941, and would last until 27 March, with a lull in the fighting between mid-February to mid-March, leading some to talk of 'First' and 'Second' Battles of Keren. The mountainous terrain, according to Battistelli, "presented one of the most formidable natural defences that had to be overcome in World War II". Keren was protected by a series of high peaks and the Italians had concentrated a large army there, manning trenches. This made for a longer and more costly battle than the British offensive in Eritrea had faced up to that point. Infantry assaults by 4th Indian Division on the mountains and ridges began, but hard-won gains were typically lost to counterattacks, and soon ammunition was in short supply. Gazelle Force was committed to the battle, essentially fighting as another infantry brigade, and took two mountain peaks on 6 February and held them against counterattacks. The Acqua Gap, a mountain pass held by Italian Askari, became the scene of intense combat from 7 February onwards, with Gazelle Force joining the fighting there on the night of 9/10 February. After a final push on 12 February the British attacks were halted in order to regroup and bring up supplies, with the Italians still holding the Acqua Gap and other strategic locations.

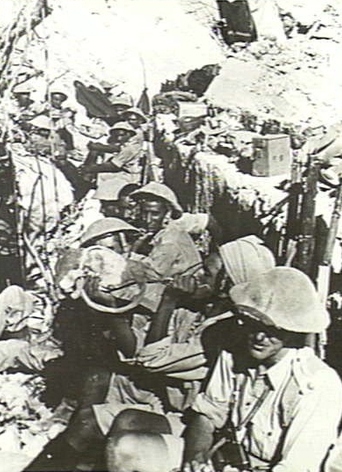
Indian Sepoys in a trench at the Battle of Keren

On 13 February 1941, Messervy was told by the commander of 4th Indian Infantry Division, Major-General Noel Beresford-Peirse, that Gazelle Force was to be disbanded. While in the open lowlands between Kassala and Agordat Gazelle Force had been in its element pursuing the enemy and flanking defensive positions, in the mountains around Keren, a mobile force was of limited value now an infantry-led battle of attrition had developed. Messervy returned to 5th Indian Division, and was promoted to Brigadier General and given command of 9th Indian Infantry Brigade on 1 March.

In the written order confirming the disbandment, Beresford-Peirse commented: "[Gazelle Force] has achieved success to a remarkable degree and has been in continuous contact with the enemy for over four months - during which period it has inflicted sharp defeats and serious losses upon the Italian Forces. Those who have served in Gazelle are entitled to be proud of their success." Messervy wrote in a letter to his father: "Owing to the mountainous nature of the country, which limits the scope of mobile forces, Gazelle has been broken up. It has, however, had a grand run for four months and I have been lucky to have had command of such a force."

Gazelle Force was redeployed out of the frontline on the night of 13/14 February 1941, and officially disbanded on 15 February. However, in late February, a replacement mobile unit called Kestrel Force was formed, including SDF and Indian Army troops, under the command of Lt-Colonel (later Brigadier) Philip Stafford Myburgh. The Battle of Keren resumed on 15 March, and following further intense fighting, the town fell to British Matilda II tanks and Indian troops in Universal Carriers on 27 March.

In April 1941, Messervy was promoted to Major General and took command of 4th Indian Infantry Division, which he led in the North African campaign until 2 January 1942.

== Bibliography ==
- Battistelli, Pier Paolo (2024). East Africa Campaign 1940−41: The Battle for the Horn of Africa. Oxford: Osprey Publishing. ISBN 978-1-47-286071-2.
- Maule, Henry (1961). Spearhead General: The epic story of General Sir Frank Messervy and his men in Eritrea, North Africa and Burma. London: Odhams Press.
- Pitt, Barrie (1980). Crucible of War (Vol.1): Wavell's Command. London: Jonathan Cape. ISBN 978-1-08-224835-1.
- Playfair, I. S. O.; et al. (1957) [1954]. Butler, J. R. M. (ed.). The Mediterranean and Middle East: The Early Successes Against Italy (to May 1941). History of the Second World War, United Kingdom Military Series. Vol. I (4th ed.). London: HMSO. OCLC 494123451.
- Prasad, Bisheshwar (1963). Official history of the Indian armed forces in the second world war 1939 - 45 : east african campaign 1940-41. Agra: University of Agra Press.
- Soboski, Marek (2020). East Africa 1940–1941 (land campaign): The Italian Army defends the Empire in the Horn of Africa. Zielona Góra: independently published. ISBN 979-8-57-786912-0.

== See also ==
- Gideon Force
- Jock column
- Long Range Desert Group
- Popski's Private Army
