= Colin Frederick Blackden =

Brigadier Colin Frederick Blackden (1897 – November 1986) was an officer in the British Army during the Second World War.

Blackden was acting commander of several brigades of the King's African Rifles during the East African Campaign.

== Command history ==
- Acting Commanding Officer, 2nd (East Africa) Infantry Brigade, East Africa – 1940
- Acting Commanding Officer, 22nd (East Africa) Infantry Brigade, detached to 11th African Division – 1941
- Commanding Officer, Lines of Communication Area, East Africa – 1941 to 1942
- Commanding Officer 27th (N Rhodesia) Infantry Brigade, East Africa – 1942
- Commanding Officer, Sub-Area, East Africa – 1943 to 1944

== See also ==
- East African Campaign
- Order of Battle, East African Campaign (World War II)
