= Sudan Defence Force =

Formation of the British Colonial Auxiliary Forces (1925–1956)

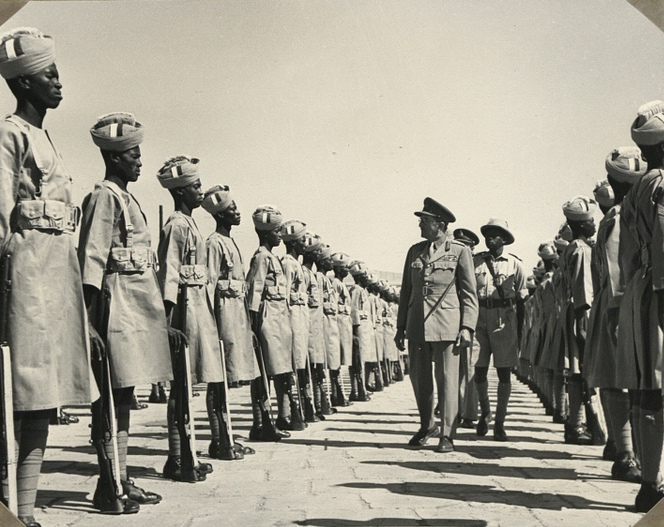
- Undated photo of inspection of SDF honour guard by Chief of the Imperial General Staff.
- Active: 1925–1956
- Country: (United Kingdom) (Kingdom of Egypt) Anglo-Egyptian Sudan
- Allegiance: British Empire
- Branch: British Colonial Auxiliary Forces
- Type: Line infantry
- Role: Light infantry
- Garrison/HQ: Khartoum
- Nickname: SDF

Insignia
- Flag of the Sudan Defence Force (1925–1956)

The Sudan Defence Force (SDF) was a formation of the British Colonial Auxiliary Forces raised in the Anglo-Egyptian Sudan in 1925 to assist local police in internal security duties and maintain the condominium's territorial integrity. During the Second World War, it campaigned in East Africa as part of the East African campaign and in North Africa during the Western Desert campaign.

== Establishment ==
Between 1898 and 1925 Sudanese soldiers served in separate infantry battalions of the Egyptian Army, under British and Egyptian officers. These were designated as either "Sudanese Battalions" or "Arab Battalions", based on their region of recruitment within the Sudan. In contrast to the bulk of the Egyptian Army, who were recruited through annual conscription, the Sudanese units enlisted only long-serving volunteers.

Following a mutiny of Sudanese troops in 1924, and at a time of unrest in Egypt itself, the garrisoning of the Sudan was put on a new basis. Egyptian military units and Egyptian officers of Sudanese battalions were transferred back to Egypt itself. The Sudanese troops remaining were incorporated into the newly created Sudan Defence Force. The junior commissioned officer and NCO positions previously held by Egyptian personnel, were now open to "Sudanisation". A military academy was opened in Omdurman to train the new Sudanese officer corps, most of whom were Muslims from the north. By 1939 the SDF numbered 5,000 officers and men.

== Composition ==
O'Ballance describes the SDF on its formation as divided into five regions, with '..four "corps", all dissimilar, the Eastern Arab Corps, based at Kasala, comprising mostly infantry companies, with a small mounted detachment, the Camel Corps in Kordofan (another source refers to it as 'the Hajana') with a large element of camel-borne soldiers to patrol the vast desert expanses, the Western Arab Corps in Darfur consisting of a few mounted companies and the Equatoria Corps (often referred to as the Southern Corps) in the three southern provinces, consisting of infantry companies – as, even leaving the tsetse fly out of account, camels and horses were of little value in the forest and swamp. There was a detachment of cavalry at Shendi (other sources refer to the 'Shendi Horse') and of engineers at Omdurman, the establishment being just under 5,000. Ibrahim Abboud commanded the Camel Corps after the Second World War. (OB 50)

"Before the establishment of the SDF, under the early Condominium, troops in the Sudan had been part of the Egyptian Army, which then consisted of eight Egyptian (that is, serving in Egypt) and seven Sudanese (serving in the Sudan) battalions, the latter was officered by both British and Egyptians, the soldiers being Egyptian fellaheen and Sudanese."

In peacetime, the SDF comprised approximately 4,500 regular Sudanese soldiers. During the Second World War, the SDF expanded greatly to counter the threat from the four neighbouring Italian territories, to the north-west, Libya, to the east Eritrea, Italian Somalia and the recently (1936) occupied Abyssinia (Ethiopia). To accommodate the extra numbers, a new war-service battalion was formed, the Sudanese Frontier Force. In wartime, the SDF grew to as many as 20,000 men.

There were also two units of improvised special forces to which the SDF contributed personnel during World War II:

- Gideon Force (under Orde Wingate).
- Gazelle Force (war-formed; see Playfair, Volume I.).

== Background ==
The British did not garrison their Empire exclusively with British troops, almost every territory had a local militia or an indigenous regular force. Prior to 1925, the garrison of the Sudan comprised a British battalion near the capital and battalions of the Egyptian Army, both Egyptian and Sudanese, in the regional capitals.

British military involvement in the Sudan goes back to the days of Generals Charles Gordon and Herbert Kitchener who were sent by London to defend British interests in the country. In 1896–1898 Kitchener led the advance on Khartoum in command of an Anglo-Egyptian Expeditionary Force composed of British, Egyptian and Sudanese troops. As a young Army officer Winston Churchill saw military service in the Sudan.

Since 1819 the Sudan had been a territory loosely administered by Egypt but in the 1880s it had fallen to the forces of the Mahdi. From 1885 to 1898 it was ruled, de facto, by the Mahdi and his successor the Khalifa (literally 'Successor'). Following the defeat of the Mahdists at the Battle of Omdurman, the Sudan was reorganised as an Anglo-Egyptian Condominium. The Head of the Egyptian Army was the Governor-General and there was still a large garrison, as the territory was huge and the remoter parts, such as Darfur, were not pacified until 1916.

In 1925, the Governor-General Sir Lee Stack was assassinated by a group of Egyptian nationalists, while being driven through Cairo. Sudanese soldiers in Khartoum mutinied, the Egyptian Army garrison of the Sudan was deemed unreliable and the Egyptian battalions were sent home, while the Sudanese battalions were disbanded. One hundred and forty British officers were transferred from the Egyptian army and a new Sudanese force was formed under the first Kaid Lewa Huddleston who had previously been acting Sirdar (Commander-in-Chief) of the Egyptian Army. The structure of the new force of about 6,000 troops was slightly different: a little looser and more territorial, to give a better esprit de corps and sense of responsibility in each 'Corps' for its own territory. Unlike the old battalions, with anonymous numbers, the names of the four main corps were Camel Corps, Eastern Arab Corps, Western Arab Corps and Equatoria Corps. These were intended to give a distinct and regional, identity, like English county regiments. Recruitment in each Corps reflected the local ethnicities. These corps were supported by artillery, engineer, armoured car and machine-gun units, plus medical, signals and transport services.

Some continuity was maintained, the ruler of Egypt, the Khedive or Viceroy, had been, nominally, a subject of the Ottoman Sultan and so the SDF continued to use Egyptian ranks, which in turn were derived from former Ottoman titles. The result was that British officers in the Sudan were called Bimbashi not Major, or an Arabic equivalent, and Kaimakam. The use of Turkish military terms extended beyond the rank structure.

== Inter-war years ==
The main duties of the SDF were internal security, assisting the police in the event of unrest, including restraining inter-tribal violence, cattle raiding and slave trading; or natural disaster. In such a vast country, companies could be detached on garrison duties far from the Corps headquarters.

In the mid to late 1930s, the SDF was used to counter the Italian military forces under Marshal Italo Balbo based in Italian North Africa (Africa Settentrionale Italiana or ASI) Libya. In December 1933, the Italians probed various positions in the Jebel Uweinat area along the poorly defined border between the Kingdom of Egypt, the Sudan and ASI. Responding to the Italian probes in the area, the SDF was ordered to occupy the Merga oasis and then the area around the Karkur Marr spring. The Italian conquest of Ethiopia led to a reorganisation and an increase in scope of the force. By June 1940 the SDF comprised twenty-one companies—including five (later six) Motor Machine Gun Companies— totalling 4,500 men.

== Second World War ==
As part of the Anglo-Egyptian "Condominium", the Sudan was at war with the Axis from the time of the Invasion of Poland in 1939 and the United Kingdom declared war on Germany. Initially the war was limited to Europe and so the Sudan Defence Force had little to do other than preparation work should the land war reach Africa.

From 10 June 1940, when Fascist Italy declared war on Britain and France, the SDF was involved in the East African Campaign. At first, the SDF went on the defensive against attacks into the Sudan by forces of the Italian Regio Esercito and the Italian Regia Aeronautica based in Italian East Africa (Africa Orientale Italiana AOI). The Italians occupied the railway junction at Kassala, the small fort at Gallabat, and the villages of Ghezzan, Kurmuk and Dumbode on the Blue Nile. In the first days of August, an Italian force of irregular Eritreans raided as far north as Port Sudan.

The SDF fought during the East African Campaign on the "Northern Front" under the command of Lieutenant-General William Platt. In October 1940, three motor machine-gun companies from the SDF were part of Gazelle Force, a mobile reconnaissance and fighting force commanded by Colonel Frank Messervy. The Frontier battalion from the SDF was part of Gideon Force commanded by Major Orde Wingate. In January 1941, during the British and Commonwealth offensive into the AOI, the SDF took part in the successful invasion of Eritrea. During this invasion, the SDF contributed machine gun companies, howitzer batteries, and other forces (including some homemade armoured cars).

The SDF also played an active role during the Western Desert Campaign along the Sudanese border with ASI in North Africa. The SDF was used to supply the Free French and then the Long Range Desert Group (LRDG) garrisons of the former Italian Fort Taj at the Kufra oasis in south-eastern Libya. In March 1941, French and LRDG forces had wrested control of the fort from the Italians during the Battle of Kufra.

SDF convoys of 3-ton trucks had to make a round trip of about 1,300 miles to keep the garrisons at Kufra supplied with petrol, food, and other vital supplies. The overall scarcity of petrol meant that LRDG patrols could do little more than guard Kufra against attacks from the north. They were unable to raid northwards from Kufra. In February 1941, the situation was somewhat improved when twenty 10-ton trucks were added to the convoys. Ultimately the SDF took over the garrison duties at the oasis from the LRDG. In September 1942 Force Z of the SDF battalion working with the LRDG launched a raid on Jalo Oasis. Captain Preston John Hurman discusses this action in his war memories held by the Imperial War Museum. on Operation Nicety in support to Operation Agreement.

The SDF provided the garrison for Jalo Oasis. British Military Intelligence in Cairo worked very closely with the SDF and used them in numerous operations. In 1942 on instructions from London, British Military Intelligence, Cairo and elements of the Sudan Defence Force were involved with countering Operation Salaam, the infiltration of German Brandenburgers into Egypt. Together with British intelligence agents and members of the SDF were ordered to intercept and capture the Abwehr (German military intelligence commandos and their Hungarian guide, desert explorer László Almásy.

Even after the Tunisian Campaign had ended in Allied victory, SDF patrols were busy thwarting German efforts to land agents behind the lines. The Germans continued attempts to make contact with Arab rebels. On 15 May 1943, a four-engine aircraft with German markings attempted to land at El Mukaram only to be engaged and shot up by a SDF patrol. The aircraft was able to take off and make good its escape, but it did so with casualties and flying on two engines.

By the end of the war, the SDF was an experienced military force with about 70 Sudanese officers, almost all of them Muslim northerners. Gradually Sudanese officers were appointed to replace British officers in the years that preceded independence.

== Independence ==
"From mid-1945 to the introduction of self-determination in January 1954, the number of men serving in the SDF remained roughly constant, between 4,500 and 5,000."

In March 1954 British troops in the Sudan consisted of one battalion stationed in Khartoum, reporting ultimately to the Governor-General. The Governor-General's military commander was the Major-General Commanding British Troops in the Sudan, who was also Commandant of the Sudan Defence Force. In this post from 1950 onward was Major General Reginald 'Cully' Scoones. The last British troops, 1st Battalion Royal Leicestershire Regiment, left the country on 16 August 1955. Ibrahim Abboud was Commander of the SDF in 1949 and Assistant Commander in Chief in 1954. He was appointed Commander in Chief of the Sudanese Armed Forces at independence. Aboud later served as Prime Minister of Sudan from 1958 to 1964 and as president in 1964.

One source wrote that Sudan was "the one African Country south of the Sahara to emerge from the colonial period with a military establishment possessing the attributes of an independent national army." Internal religious and racial divisions led to the mutiny and disbandment of the Equatoria Corps (recruited from southern black Africans) in 1955 and the commencement of a 17-year civil war.

== British officers ==
Most middle-ranking and senior officers of the SDF were British Army officers on secondment for a few years. The attraction was independence of command, sporting (game-hunting) opportunities in leisure hours and local promotion (1 rank). On the outbreak of war, many young men of the Sudan Political Service, the administrative service for the Condominium, were allowed to join up. Those who served in the SDF included:

- Wilfred Thesiger, desert explorer
- Hilary Hook
- Maurice Stanley Lush, chief political officer
- Orde Wingate

Commandants of the Sudan Defence Force included those officers listed below: In this role the Commandant carried the Arabic title of al-qa'id al-'amm ("the Leader of the Army") and was often referred to simply as "the Kaid".

- Major-General Hubert Huddleston: 1925 – March 1930
- Major-General Stephen Butler: March 1930 – March 1935
- Major-General Harold Franklyn: March 1935 – December 1938
- Lieutenant-General Sir William Platt: November 1938 – October 1941
- Lieutenant-General Sir Noel Beresford-Peirse: October 1941 – April 1942
- Major-General Balfour Hutchison: May 1942 – December 1943
- Major-General William Ramsden: January 1944 – 1945
- Major-General William Donovan Stamer: 1945 – June 1948
- Major-General Lashmer Whistler: June 1948 – May 1950
- Major-General Reginald Scoones: May 1950 – November 1954

== See also ==
- History of Anglo-Egyptian Sudan
- East African campaign
- Order of battle, East African campaign
- Bikaner Camel Corps
- Somaliland Camel Corps
- King's African Rifles
- Sudan Defence Force General Service Medal
- Sudanese Armed Forces
