= William Platt =

British Army officer (1885–1975)

General Sir William Platt GBE KCB DSO
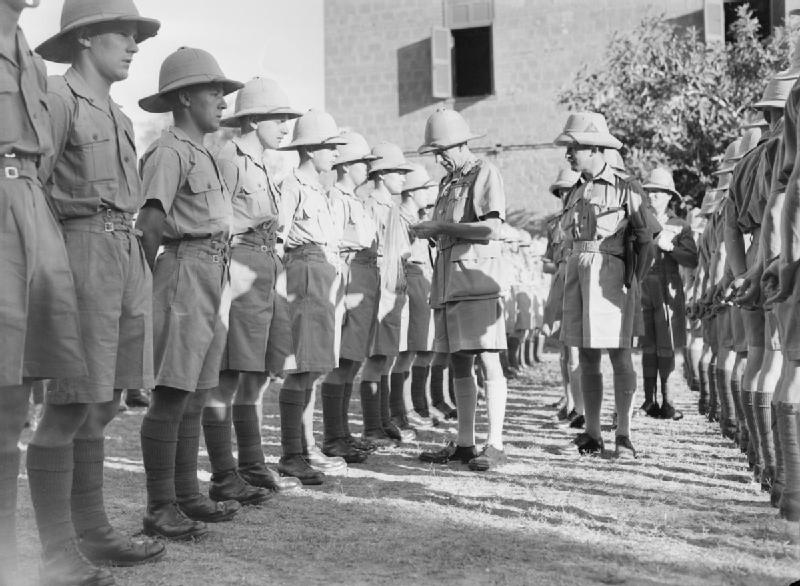
- Platt inspecting troops during the Second World War
- Born: 14 June 1885; Brooklands, Cheshire, England
- Died: 28 September 1975 (aged 90); London, England
- Military career
- Allegiance: United Kingdom
- Branch: British Army
- Service years: 1905–1945
- Rank: General
- Nickname: "The Kaid"
- Service number: 9000
- Units: Northumberland Fusiliers; Wiltshire Regiment
- Commands: East Africa Command; Sudan Defence Force; 7th Infantry Brigade; 2nd Battalion, Wiltshire Regiment
- Conflicts: North-West Frontier; First World War; Western Front; Second World War; East African campaign; Battle of Keren; Battle of Gondar
- Awards: Knight Grand Cross of the Order of the British Empire; Knight Commander of the Order of the Bath; Distinguished Service Order; Mentioned in Despatches (6); Grand Cordon of the Order of the Nile (Egypt); Grand Cross of the Order of the Star of Ethiopia; Commander of the Legion of Honour (France)
- Other work: Colonel of The Wiltshire Regiment (1942–54); Director, Messrs. Mather and Platt Ltd., Manchester (1946–57)

General Sir William Platt, GBE, KCB, DSO (14 June 1885 – 28 September 1975) was a senior officer of the British Army during both the First and the Second World Wars.

== Early years ==
Platt was educated at Marlborough College and the Royal Military College, Sandhurst.

On graduating from the latter, Platt was commissioned as a second lieutenant into the Northumberland Fusiliers in August 1905. From 1908 to 1914, he served on the North-West Frontier in India where he won the Distinguished Service Order (DSO) and was mentioned in despatches for the first of six such citations. Platt was promoted to lieutenant in June 1909 and captain in November 1914.

== First World War ==
From 1914 to 1918, Platt fought in France and Belgium on the Western Front during the First World War. Between 1915 and 1916, he was appointed brigade major of the 103rd (Tyneside Irish) Brigade, a Kitchener's Army formation, and was promoted brevet major in December 1916. Between 1916 and 1917, Platt was a General Staff Officer Grade 2 (GSO2) of the 21st Division, another Kitchener's Army formation. In 1917, he was made a GSO2 of II Australian and New Zealand Army Corps in France. This corps was later reformed as the British XXII Corps. In July 1918 he was promoted to temporary lieutenant colonel and appointed GSO1 of the 37th Division.

== Between the wars ==
After attending the Staff College, Camberley from 1919 to 1920, Platt was GSO1 of the 37th Division. In 1920, he once more became a brigade major, this time of the 12th Brigade, Eastern Command and then, until 1922, Galway Brigade, Irish Command, after which he returned to regimental duties. Platt's permanent rank was advanced to major in January 1924, simultaneous with the award of brevet lieutenant-colonel status.

In March 1924, Platt once again received an appointment as brigade major, this time for two years in Egypt. In late 1927, Platt returned to the War Office in London, taking the post of Deputy Assistant Adjutant General on the Adjutant-General's staff. His promotion to substantive lieutenant-colonel rank came in 1930 simultaneous with his transfer to the Wiltshire Regiment to command its 2nd Battalion. On completion of this tour of duty in January 1933 Platt was promoted full colonel, and appointed as the GSO1 of the 3rd Division, Bulford.

In October 1934, Platt was given command of 7th Infantry Brigade in the rank of temporary brigadier. From 1937 to 1938, he was aide-de-camp to the King and in late 1938 Platt was promoted to major-general to take up the appointment as Commandant of the Sudan Defence Force. In this role he carried the Arabic title of al-qa'id al-'amm ("the Leader of the Army") and was often referred to simply as "the Kaid". He was appointed a Companion of the Order of the Bath in 1939.

== Second World War ==
As a result of the threat from Italian forces in Italian East Africa, Platt's modest forces in Sudan were reinforced in late 1940 and early 1941, primarily by the arrival of the Indian 4th Infantry Division and the Indian 5th Infantry Division. In recognition of his larger corps-sized command he was promoted acting lieutenant-general in January 1941.

He commanded the forces invading Italian East Africa from Sudan during the East African Campaign. After re-taking the abandoned Kassala railway junction in Sudan on 18 January 1941, Platt advanced into Eritrea and captured Agordat on 28 January. He next faced strong Italian resistance at Keren. From 3 March to 1 April, Platt's leadership played a large part in the successful outcome of the Battle of Keren.

The Eritrean capital, Asmara, was taken by the Indian 5th Infantry Division on 1 April while Keren was still being mopped up by the Indian 4th Infantry Division. After the battle of Keren, Platt lost the Indian 4th Infantry Division which returned to Egypt. On 8 April, the port city of Massawa surrendered. The forces still under Platt then marched on Amba Alagi.

Platt's forces, advancing from the Sudan, met the forces of Lieutenant-General Alan Cunningham, advancing from Kenya, at Amba Alagi. A large Italian force under Amedeo, Duke of Aosta, was dug in at Amba Alagi in what it considered impregnable positions. The Battle of Amba Alagi started on 3 May. On 18 May, the Duke of Aosta surrendered his embattled force and the campaign in East Africa was all but over.

From 1941 to 1945, Platt was the General Officer Commanding-in-Chief of the East Africa Command, which although no longer a theatre of war was an important source of manpower. Platt raised seventeen new battalions of the King's African Rifles. From 1942 to 1954, Platt was the honorary colonel of the Wiltshire Regiment. His lieutenant-general rank was made permanent in May 1941 and he was promoted to general in January 1943. He retired from the army in April 1945.

== Honours and awards ==
In addition to his British honours, Platt also received the Egyptian Order of the Nile (1st Class) in 1942, the Grand Cross of the Order of the Star of Ethiopia in 1945, and the French Légion d'Honneur in 1945.

== Aftermath ==
After his retirement from the army Platt joined his family's business, Mather & Platt, where he served as a director until 1957.

== Army career summary ==
- Commissioned officer, Northumberland Fusiliers – 1905 to 1914
- Captain, Northumberland Fusiliers – 1914 to 1915
- Brigade-Major, 103rd Infantry Brigade – 1915 to 1916
- General Staff Officer, Grade 2, of the 21st Division – 1916 to 1917
- General Staff Officer, Grade 2, of the 2nd Australian and New Zealand Army Corps – 1917 to 1918
- General Staff Officer, Grade 1, of the 37th Division – 1918 to 1920
- Brigade-Major, 12 Infantry Brigade, 1st Eastern Command and Galway Brigade, Irish Command – 1920 to 1922
- Commanding Officer, 2nd Battalion Wiltshire Regiment – 1930 to 1933
- General Staff Officer 1, 3rd Division – 1933 to 1934
- Commanding Officer 7th Brigade – 1934 to 1938
- General Officer Commanding, British Troops in Sudan – 1938 to 1941
- General Officer Commanding, Sudan Defence Force – 1938 to 1941
- General Officer Commanding, Northern Front, Eritrea and Ethiopia – 1941
- Commander in Chief, East Africa Command – 1941 to 1945

== Bibliography ==
- Mackenzie, Compton (1951). Eastern Epic: September 1939 – March 1943 Defence. Vol. I. London: Chatto & Windus. OCLC 1412578.
- Mead, Richard (2007). Churchill's Lions: a biographical guide to the key British generals of World War II. Stroud (UK): Spellmount. ISBN 978-1-86227-431-0.
- Smart, Nick (2005). Biographical Dictionary of British Generals of the Second World War. Barnesley: Pen & Sword. ISBN 1844150496.

Military offices
Preceded by Harry Wetherall (As GOC East Africa Force)	GOC East Africa Command; 1941–1945	Succeeded by Sir Kenneth Anderson
