= Battle of Keren order of battle =

The Battle of Keren order of battle shows Italian army forces that participated in the Battle of Keren from February to March 1941 and British troops in Sudan on 20 January 1941, which participated in military operations against Eritrea during the East African Campaign 1940–1941.

== Regio Esercito at Keren, 1941 ==
=== 7 February 1941 ===
- Zelale Sector: Colonel Francesco Prina
  - 52nd Colonial Battalion (11th Brigade)
  - 9th Colonial Battalion (2nd Brigade)
  - 1 Battery, 81 mm mortars
- Sanchil Sector: Colonel Corsi
  - 2nd Grenadier Battalion
  - "Tipo" Colonial Battalion
  - 51st Colonial Battalion
  - 97th Colonial Battalion
  - 3rd Bersagliere Battalion
  - 104th Artillery Group
  - 10th Anti-Tank Battery, 5th Artillery Group, 4 miscellaneous anti-tank guns
- Mount Amba Sector: Colonel Adolfo Oliveti
  - 56th Colonial Battalion (11th Brigade)
  - 63rd Colonial Battalion (11th Brigade)
  - 106th Colonial Battalion (5th Brigade)
  - 2nd Artillery Group
  - 1st Battalion, Garrison Commanders Reserve
  - 10th Colonial Battalion
  - 4th "Toselli" Colonial Battalion

=== 5 March 1941 ===
- Begana Zelale-Falestoh Sector:
  - 11th Colonial Brigade
  - 51st, 52nd, 56th, 63rd Battalion
  - 44th Artillery Group (65/17 guns, camel transported)
  - 1 Battery, 75 mm/13 guns
- Dologorodoc–Sanchil Sector:
  - 2nd Grenadier Battalion
  - "Tipo" Colonial Battalion
  - 11th Artillery Group (65/17 guns)
  - 5th Artillery Group (65/17 guns)
  - Anti-Aircraft Battery (20 mm guns)
  - Anti-Tank Battery (47/32 guns)
- Mount Amba–Brig's Peak–Rotunda Sector:
  - 5th Colonial Brigade
  - 97th & 106th Battalion
  - Alpini "Work Amba" Battalion
  - 5th Colonial Battalion
  - 1st/60th Artillery Group (65 mm/17 guns)
  - Artillery Group (105 mm/28 howitzers)
  - Anti-Aircraft Battery (75 mm/27 Ck guns)
- Samana (Beit–Garbru–Dobac) Sector:
  - 12th Colonial Brigade
  - 36th, 41st & 103rd Battalions
  - 77 mm/28 Battery
  - 65 mm/17 Battery
  - 4th Colonial Battalion
- Northern Sector:
  - 2nd Colonial Brigade
  - 9th, 10th & 151st Battalion
  - 6th Colonial Brigade
  - 19th, 24th, 31st & 34th Battalion
  - 44th Black Shirt Battalion
  - 2nd Artillery Group (65 mm/17 guns)
  - 6th Artillery Group (65 mm/17 guns)
  - 13th Artillery Group (65mm/17 guns)
  - 2 Batteries (77 mm/28 guns)
- Garrison Commander's Reserve
  - 11th Black Shirt Legion (2 battalions)
  - 44th Colonial Brigade
  - 105th & 105th Battalion
  - 3 Independent Black Shirt Companies
  - 15th Squadron, Cavalry Group

=== 24 March 1941 ===
- Begana–Zelale–Falestoh Sector: Colonel Vincenzo Ossoli
  - Combined Colonial Battalion
  - Remnants 52nd & 63rd Battalion
  - 105th Colonial Battalion
  - 1 Battery, 106th Artillery Group
- Dologorodoc–Sanchil Sector: Colonel Francesco Prina
  - 50th Colonial Battalion
  - Alpini "Work Amba" Battalion
  - Combined 57th/85th Colonial Battalion
  - Combined 51st/56th Colonial Battalion
  - 21st & 46th Batteries, 5th Artillery Group (65 mm/17 guns)
- Mount Sanchil Sector: Colonel Corsi
  - 11th Regiment, Savoia Grenadiers
  - 1st Grenadiers Battalion
  - 3rd Bersaglieri Battalion
  - 10th Battery, 5th Artillery Group
- Mount Amba Sector: Colonel Adolfo Oliveti
  - 5th Colonial Battalion
  - 106th Colonial Battalion
  - 11th Black Shirt Legion
  - 3rd Carabiniere Company
  - Artillery Group (100 mm/57 howitzers)
- Sama Sector: Colonel Livio Bonelli
  - 36th Colonial Battalion
  - 41st Colonial Battalion
- Northern Sector:
  - 2nd Colonial Brigade
  - 6th Colonial Brigade
  - 12th Artillery Group
- Garrison Commander's Reserve
  - 99th Colonial Battalion
  - 132nd Colonial Battalion
  - 15th Squadron, Cavalry Group

== HQ Troops Sudan ==
HQ Troops Sudan Lieutenant-General (acting) William Platt

- Force Troops
  - "B" Squadron, 4th Royal Tank Regiment
  - 1st Independent Anti-Tank Troop
  - 68th (4th West Lancashire) Medium Regiment, RA (RHQ, 233 Battery, Signal Section & Light Aid Detachment)
    - 212 Battery, 64th (London) Medium Rgt – attached
  - 25th Heavy AA Battery, 9th HAA Regiment
  - 41st Light AA Battery, 15th (Manx) LAA Regiment
  - 1st Survey Troop, 4th Survey Regiment, RA
  - 514th Field Survey Company, RE
  - Detachment, 3rd HQ Signals
  - No. 51 Commando
  - No. 52 Commando
  - Sudan Horse, X and Y LAA Batteries, Sudan Defence Force

=== 4th Indian Infantry Division ===
(Major-General Noel Beresford-Peirse)

- 5th Indian Infantry Brigade (Brigadier Wilfrid Lewis Lloyd)
  - HQ 5th Indian Infantry Brigade
    - 5th Indian Infantry Brigade Signal Section
    - 5th Indian Infantry Brigade Anti-Tank Company
    - 5th Indian Infantry Brigade Light Aid Detachment
    - 1st Royal Fusiliers
    - 3rd Bn 1st Punjab Regiment
    - 4th Bn 6th Rajputana Rifles
- 11th Indian Infantry Brigade (Brigadier Reginald Savory)
  - HQ 11th Indian Infantry Brigade
    - 11th Indian Infantry Brigade Section
      - 11th Indian Infantry Brigade Anti-Tank Company
      - 11th Indian Infantry Brigade Light Aid Detachment
    - 2nd Bn Cameron Highlanders
    - 1/6th Rajputana Rifles
    - 3/14th Punjab Regiment
  - Gazelle Force (Colonel Frank Messervy) (ad hoc mobile force under command of 5th Indian Infantry Brigade from 11 February. Disbanded 15 February)
    - 1st Horse (Skinner's Horse) – detached from duty as 5th Indian Infantry Division reconnaissance regiment
    - 1 Troop 'P' Battery Royal Horse Artillery
    - 1 Troop 28 Field Regiment RA (18-pounders)
    - 4 Ordnance Workshop Section
    - 170 Cavalry Field Ambulance (less det)
    - 1 Motor Machine-Gun Group Sudan Defence Force (2, 4 and 6 Coys)
  - Divisional Troops
    - The Central India Horse (21st King George V's Own Horse) - divisional reconnaissance regiment
    - HQ 4th Indian Division Employment Platoon
  - Artillery (Brigadier William H B Mirrlees)
    - HQ 4th Indian Divisional Artillery
    - 1st Field Regiment (11/80th Battery, 52/98th Battery, Signal Section & Light Aid Detachment)
    - 25th Field Regiment (31/58th Battery, 12/25th Battery, Signal Section & Light Aid Detachment)
    - 31st Field Regiment (105/119th Battery, 106/118th Battery, Signal Section & Light Aid Detachment)
  - Engineers
    - HQ 4th Indian Divisional Engineers
    - 4th Field Company Sappers & Miners
    - 12th Field Company Sappers & Miners
    - 18th Field Company Sappers & Miners
    - 11th Field Park Company Sappers & Miners
  - Signals
    - 4th Indian Divisional Signals (and Light Aid Detachment)
  - Supplies & Transport
    - HQ 4th Indian Division RIASC
    - Divisional HQ Mechanical Transport Company RIASC
    - 4th Indian Division Supply Column (Light Aid Detachment)
    - 4th Indian Division Ammunition Company (Light Aid Detachment)
    - 4th Indian Division Petrol Company (Light Aid Detachment)
    - 12th Supply Issue Section
    - 13th Supply Issue Section
    - 14th Supply Issue Section
    - 15th Supply Issue Section
  - Medical
    - 14th Indian Field Ambulance
    - 17th Indian Field Ambulance
    - 19th Indian Field Ambulance
    - 15th Indian Field Hygiene Section
    - 2nd Indian Casualty Clearing Station
  - Ordnance
    - 17th Mobile Workshop Company
    - 18th Mobile Workshop Company
    - 19th Mobile Workshop Company
    - 20th Mobile Workshop Company
    - 21st Mobile Workshop Company
  - Miscellaneous
    - 13th Field Post Office
    - 17th Field Post Office
    - 19th Field Post Office
    - 25th Field Post Office
    - 4th Indian Divisional Provost Unit

=== 5th Indian Infantry Division ===
(Major-General Lewis Heath)

  - 9th Indian Infantry Brigade (Brigadier A.G.O.M. Mayne to late February then acting Brigadier F. W. Messervy)
    - HQ 9th Indian Infantry Brigade
      - 9th Indian Infantry Brigade Signal Section
    - 2nd West Yorkshire Regiment
    - 3/5th Mahratta Light Infantry
    - 3 Royal/12th Frontier Force Regiment
  - 10th Indian Infantry Brigade (Lieutenant-Colonel Bernard Fletcher acting commander until 20 March, then Brigadier Thomas "Pete" Rees)
    - HQ 10th Indian Infantry Brigade
      - 10th Indian Infantry Brigade Signal Section
    - 2nd Highland Light Infantry
    - 4/10th Baluch Regiment
    - 3/18th Royal Garhwal Rifles
  - 29th Indian Infantry Brigade (Brigadier J. C. O. Marriott)
    - HQ 29th Indian Infantry Brigade
      - 29th Indian Infantry Brigade Signal Section
    - 1st Bn Worcester Regiment
    - 3/2nd Punjab Regiment
    - 6 Royal/13th Frontier Force Rifles
  - Divisional Troops
    - 1st Horse (Skinner's Horse) – Divisional reconnaissance regiment detached from duty to Gazelle Force until 15 February
    - HQ 5th Indian Division Employment Platoon
    - 5th Indian Divisional Anti-Tank Company
  - Artillery (Brigadier Claud Vallentin)
    - HQ 5th Indian Divisional Artillery
    - 4th Field Regiment (less one troop) (4/14th Battery, 7/66th Battery, Signal Section & Light Aid Detachment)
    - 28th Field Regiment (less one troop) (1/5th Battery, 3/57th Battery, Signal Section & Light Aid Detachment)
    - 144th Army Field Regiment (less one Troop) (389th Battery, 390th Battery, Signal Section & Light Aid Detachment)
    - Jammu & Kashmir Mountain Battery Indian State Forces
    - 5th Indian Division Ammunition Unit
  - Engineers
    - HQ 5th Indian Divisional Engineers
    - 2nd Field Company Sappers & Miners
    - 20th Field Company Sappers & Miners
    - 21st Field Company Sappers & Miners
    - 44th Field Park Company Sappers & Miners
  - Signals
    - 5th Indian Divisional Signals
  - Supplies & Transport
    - HQ 5th Indian Division RIASC
    - 20th Supply Issue Section
    - 32nd Supply Issue Section
    - 33rd Supply Issue Section
    - 52nd Divisional HQ Mechanical Transport Section
    - 14th Indian Mechanical Transport Company
    - 15th Indian Mechanical Transport Company (less 28 Section)
    - 29th Indian Mechanical Transport Company
  - Medical
    - 3rd Indian Casualty Clearing Station
    - 10th Indian Field Ambulance
    - 20th Indian Field Ambulance
    - 7th Indian Field Hygiene Section
    - 12th Indian Field Hygiene Section
  - Ordnance
    - 22nd Mobile Workshop Company
    - 23rd Mobile Workshop Company
    - 24th Mobile Workshop Company
    - 25th Mobile Workshop Company
    - 26th Mobile Workshop Company
  - Miscellaneous
    - 15th Field Post Office
    - 23rd Field Post Office
    - 24th Field Post Office
    - 5th Indian Divisional Provost Unit
- 7th Indian Infantry Brigade (Brigadier Harold Rawdon Briggs) (Detached from 4th Indian Infantry Division as a reinforced independent brigade group known as Briggsforce)
  - HQ, 7th Indian Infantry Brigade
    - 7th Indian Infantry Brigade Signal Section
    - 7th Indian Infantry Brigade Anti-Tank Company
    - 7th Indian Infantry Brigade Light Aid Detachment
  - 1st Royal Sussex Regiment
  - 4/11th Sikh Regiment (detached to Force Troops)
  - 4/16th Punjab Regiment

=== Brigade of the East (Brigade d'Orient) ===
Data taken from Ghémard (2017) unless noted. (Free French) - Colonel Raoul Magrin-Vernerey (nom de guerre Ralph Monclar)

    - 1er Bataillon de Legion Etrangere (1st Battalion of French Foreign Legion)
    - Bataillon de Marche 3 (3rd provisional battalion of Senegalese tirailleurs)
    - 3e Cie du 1er bataillon d' infanterie de marine (3rd Company 1st marine infantry battalion)
    - 1er Escadron de Spahis Marocains (1st Squadron of Moroccan Spahis)
    - 1er Groupe d'Artillerie Coloniale (1st Colonial artillery battalion)
  - 4th motor machine-gun company of the Sudan Defence Force
  - One Battery from 25th Field Regiment, Royal Artillery (Indian 4th Infantry Division)
  - 12th Field Company Queen Victoria's Own Madras Sappers & Miners, IE
