= Battle of Gemmano =

1944 WWII battle in Italy

- Part of the Gothic Line Offensive during the Italian campaign of World War II
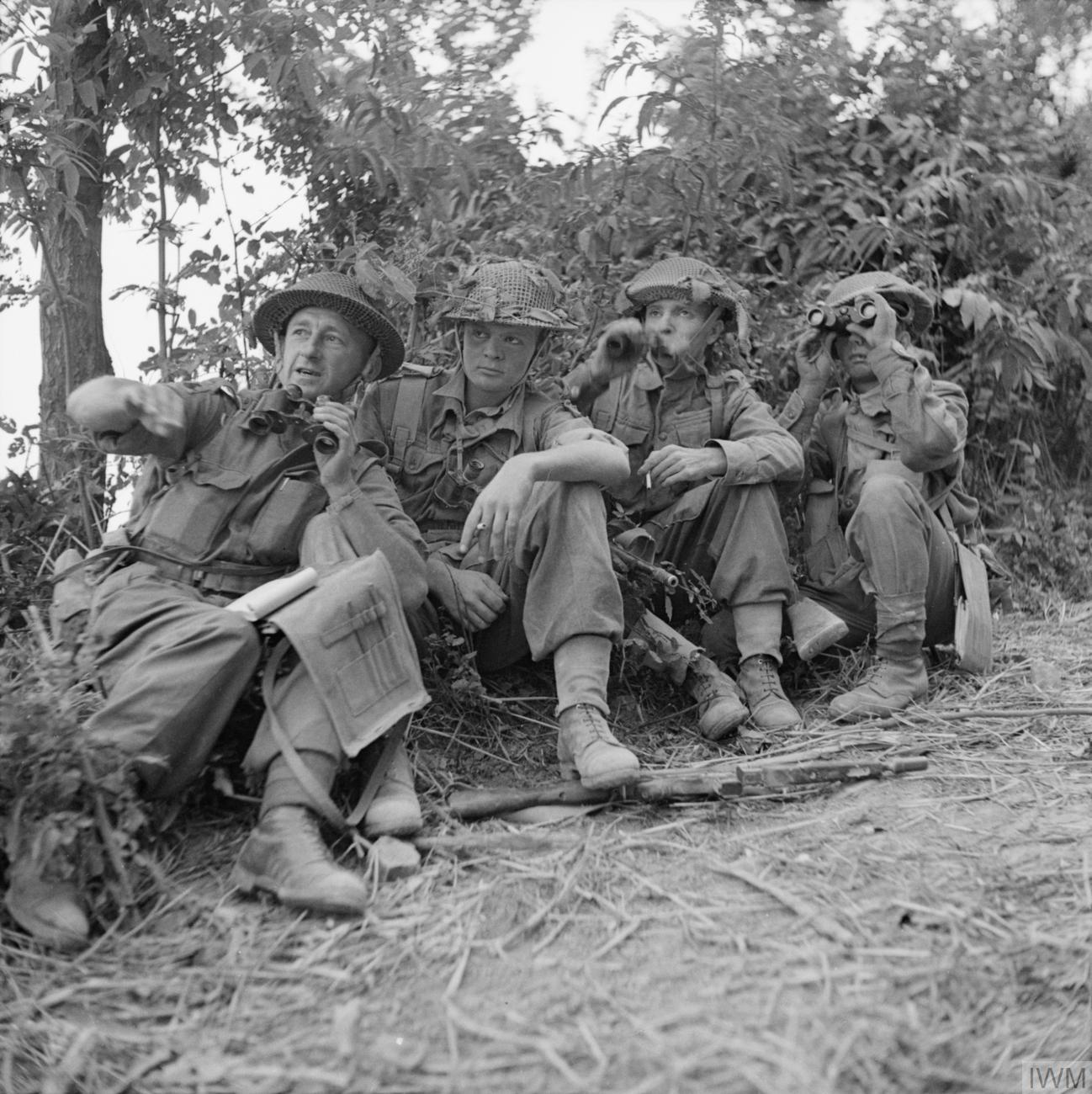
- Platoon commanders of 7th Battalion, Oxford and Bucks Light Infantry, part of 167th Brigade of 56th (London) Division, plan the attack on the village of Gemmano, 6 September 1944.
Date	4–15 September 1944
Location	Gemmano, Italy
Result	Allied victory

Belligerents
Germany	United Kingdom: British India

Commanders and leaders
Traugott Herr	John Yeldham Whitfield

Strength
German LXXVI Panzer Corps	56th Infantry Division, British V Corps

The Battle of Gemmano took place during World War II, between 4 September and 15 September 1944. The battle occurred in the area of the Gothic Line, near the Apennine Mountains in northern Italy, which would soon turn out to be the last line of defence for the Axis powers in Italy. The village of Gemmano was eventually captured on September 9, 1944, by the British Eighth Army, but two more subsequent attacks were needed to secure the area surrounding the village of Gemmano. Fighting was so fierce, similar to that of the famous battle of Monte Cassino, that the battle was sometimes referred to as “The Cassino of the Adriatic”.

== Order of battle ==
German

- 71st Infantry Division
  - 191st Regiment
  - 194th Regiment
  - 211th Regiment
- 98th Infantry Division
  - 117th Regiment
  - 289th Regiment
  - 290th Regiment
- 5th Mountain Division
  - 85th Regiment
  - 100th Mountain Regiment
  - 95th Mountain Artillery
- 278th Infantry Division
  - 992nd Regiment
  - 993rd Regiment
  - 994th Regiment
  - 278th Rifle Battalion

British

- 44th Reconnaissance Regiment
- 56th (London) Infantry Division
  - 6th Cheshire Regiment
  - 167th (1st London) Brigade
    - 8th Battalion, Royal Fusiliers
    - 9th Battalion, Royal Fusiliers
    - 7th Battalion, Oxfordshire and Buckinghamshire Light Infantry
  - 168th (2nd London) Brigade
    - 1st Battalion, London Irish Rifles
    - 1st Battalion, Welch Regiment
    - 1st Battalion, London Scottish,
  - 169th (3rd London) Brigade
    - 2/5th Battalion, Queen's Royal Regiment (West Surrey)
    - 2/6th (Bermondsey) Battalion, Queen's Royal Regiment (West Surrey)
    - 2/7th (Southwark) Battalion, Queen's Royal Regiment (West Surrey)
- 7th Armoured Brigade
  - 2nd Royal Tank Regiment
  - 6th Royal Tank Regiment
  - 8th Royal Tank Regiment
- 25th Army Tank Brigade
  - 51st Royal Tank Regiment
  - North Irish Horse
  - 142nd Regiment Royal Armoured Corps
- 4th Indian Infantry Division
  - 5th Indian Infantry Brigade
  - 7th Indian Infantry Brigade
  - 11th Indian Infantry Brigade
  - 6th Royal Tank Regiment
  - 12th Royal Lancers

== Background ==
Under Operation Olive, the objective for the British Eighth Army on the Adriatic Coast was to break the German defences and enter the Po Plains. The US Fifth Army would then follow up with an attack north of Florence, completing the German defeat.

Lieutenant general Oliver Leese, general officer commanding Eighth Army, plan was for V Corps to attack at Gemmano and Croce and so pin down the Germans forces at the southern end of the Gothic line. At the same time Canadian Corps would attack in the north to take Coriano. The second phase of the plan had 1st Armoured Division and 4th Infantry Division passing through the Canadians and cross the Marano. The final phase was for the New Zealand Division and Canadian armoured forces to advance towards Bologna and Ferrara.

Gemmano ridge was the "anchor point" of the German line of defences north through San Savino and down the Coriano Ridge to the Adriatic Sea.

The Gemmano ridge itself was about a mile long and 1,500 feet high with four main heights along it. On the eastern end, Gemmano village was on Point 404 with a smaller height of Villa slightly to the east. West of Gemmano village 500 yards away was a single house on top of Point 414. Point 449 with a wooden cross on it was 300 yards farther west. The last height was Point 402 1,000 yards farther on above the hamlet of Zollara. Three subsidiary ridges ran up from the valley of the Ventona river to Gemmano Ridge. One ended between Gemmano and Villa, the second near the western end of Gemmano village, and the last ("Farneto Spur") at Point 449

Initially it was thought Gemmano could be bypassed. Two days before the first planned attack, on September 4, the 44th Reconnaissance Regiment was sent up towards Gemmano to guard the flank of fighting by 56th Division around Croce. The 44th reached Villa and patrolled towards Gemmano. A platoon of 30 men was sent to determine the size and strength of the German defences. The British made an unfortunate mistake, underestimating the size of the German forces as only one battalion.The actual size of the German force was approximately three battalions, around 4,500 men of the 100th Mountain Regiment (Austrian Gebirgsjägers) that were overlooking the allied positions.

The German reconnaissance battalion was on Fareto Spur, there was a battalion on each of Point 402 and Point 409, and the last battalion occupied Gemmano village and Villa.

The Allies left only one battalion to fight the battle at Gemmano because of their wrong estimation of the German forces.These German battalions consisted of antiaircraft weaponry as well, which could also be used as artillery on the advancing allied infantry and armoured vehicles.

A full battalion of Ox and Bucks was ordered to take Gemmano. They attacked on the afternoon of 6 September and entered the village. A German counterattack pushed them out back to Villa in the night. In order to take Gemmano ridge, the British decided to use a full brigade.

The plan of attack for 8 September was for the 2nd/6th and 2nd/7th Queen's Royal Regiment (West Surrey) to make the assault in the afternoon. The 2nd/6th on the left was to clear Points 414 and 449 and the 2nd/7th on the right was to capture Gemmano village itself. The third battalion of the brigade (2nd/5th Queen's) was held in reserve. Support for the attack was provided by 4.2-inch mortars, medium machine-guns of the 6th Bn Cheshire Regiment, two squadrons of Sherman tanks of the 8th Royal Tank Regiment, and all of the divisional artillery.

== Battle ==
It rained heavily on the morning of the attack. heavy rainfall hindered the advance of Allies as well. This heavy rainfall caused roads to crumble, rivers to overflow, and mud to form, all of which made it difficult for movement. As vehicles could not navigate the roads, the brigade had been provided with 130 mules for transporting ammunition and stores.

By evening on the first day 2nd/7th Queen's had the remnants of company in Gemmano established in two houses on the edge of the village and a ridge covering it. Both sides had taken large casualties from German counter-attacks. The following day, the battalion reinforced the position with another company and took control of Gemmano.

Below are personal memoirs, testimony, and description of the battle by soldiers who were involved.

"All around the bullet-chipped cross on Pt.449, the dead, khaki and field-grey, lay heaped, unburied, in score upon score; at their centre a soldier of the Lincolns whose hands were still frozen in death round the cross itself, which he had reached in his battalion's first attack. Few regiments of 8th Army had ever known fiercer fighting than that of Gemmano"

"Within twenty-four hours the only men left in the village of Gemmano... were the men who would never leave".

"They sat, wedged side by side, in the ruined cellars of the old stone houses; sprawled in piles on the doorways of barns; lay in untidy heaps in the little peasants' houses where they had crawled to die".

== Aftermath ==
Casualties from both sides are not well documented, but according to British sources, Germans killed in action were more than 900. Lt.Col.Ernst also estimated more than 2,400 casualties of dead, wounded, and MIA of his regiment alone. British casualties were immense too: every battalion lost, on average, 100 to 150 men. More than 100 civilians were also killed during the battle, mainly due to the Royal Navy and its bombardment of Gemmano.

The German 100th Mountain Regiment, or Gebirgsjager, under the orders from Lt. Col. Richard Ernst, earned the regiment six Knight's Cross of the Iron Cross (Ritterkreuz des Eisernes Kreuz) for valor demonstrated during the battle of Gemmano as well as acts of bravery in combat far beyond the normal fulfillment of duty. Ritterkruez awards were given to: Lt. Col. Richard Ernst, Capt. Heinrich Hermann, Capt. Fritz Bachmaier, Ensign August Rappel, Corp. Lorenz Schmied, and Lt. Karl Kurz

Major-General Arthur Holworthy, (CO 4th Indian Div.) wrote in his diary :"A good show. Gemmano full of dead and smells like another Cassino"
