= 5th Infantry Division (India) =

Infantry division of the Indian Army during World War II

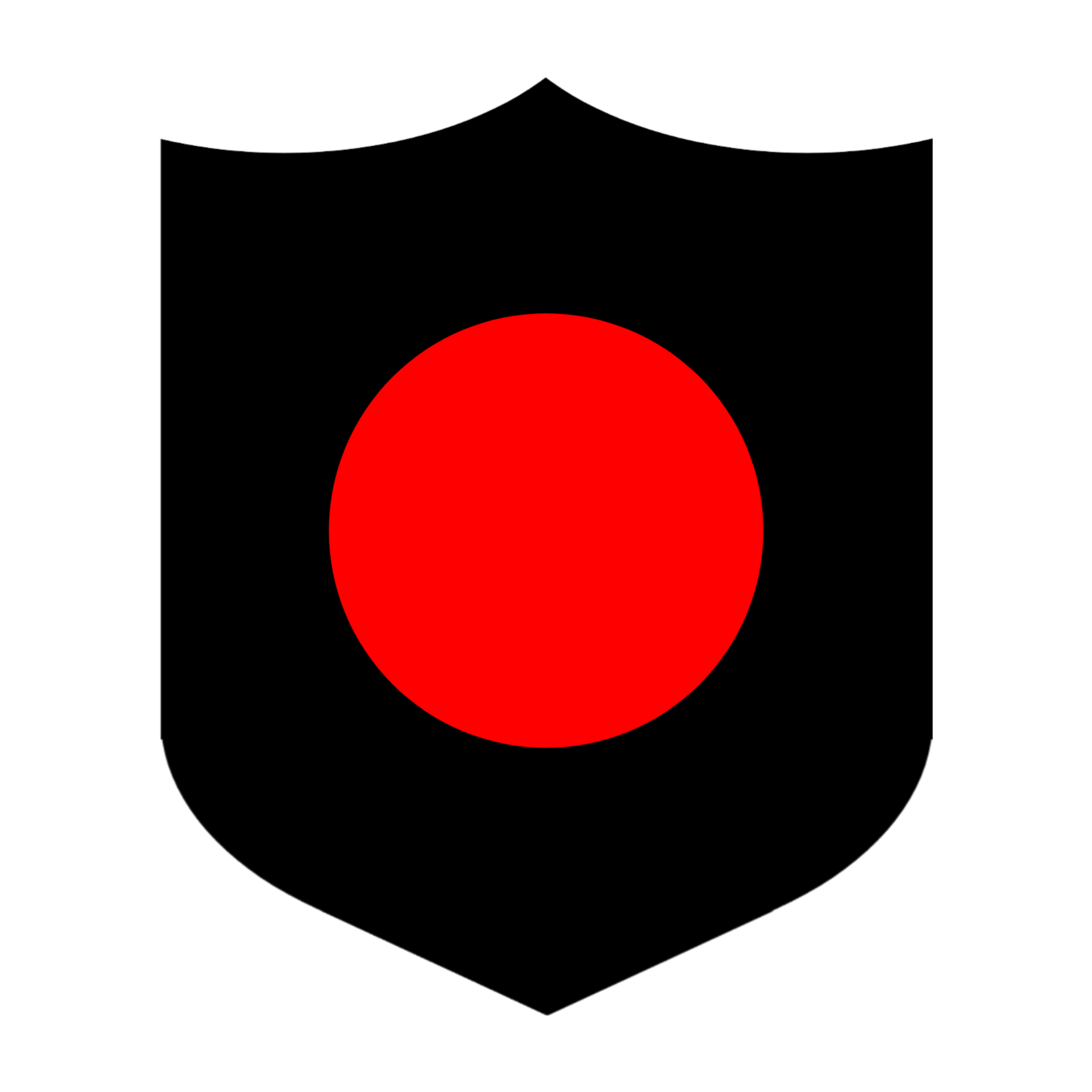
- Insignia of the 5th Infantry Division
- Active: 1939–present
- Country: (British Raj) British India; India
- Allegiance: India
- Branch: British Indian Army; Indian Army
- Type: Infantry
- Size: Division
- Part of: IV Corps
- Garrison/HQ: Rupa
- Nickname: "Ball of Fire".
- Engagements: East Africa; Battle of Kassala; Battle of Moyale; Western Desert Campaign; Burma Campaign; Battle of Kohima; Operation Tiderace; Battle of Surabaya

Commanders
- Current commander: Maj Gen KS Grewal
- Notable commanders: Lewis Heath; Harold Rawdon Briggs; Geoffrey Evans

East Africa Campaign northern front: Allied advances in 1941.

The 5th Infantry Division is an infantry division of the Indian Army. It was raised during the Second World War and fought in several theatres of war and was nicknamed the "Ball of Fire". It was one of the few Allied divisions to fight against three different armies - the Italian, German, and Japanese armies.

The division was raised in 1939 in Secunderabad with two brigades under command. In 1940, the 5th Indian Division moved to Sudan and took under command three British infantry battalions stationed there and was reorganised into three brigades of three battalions each. The division fought in the East African Campaign in Eritrea and Ethiopia during 1940 and 1941, thence moving to Egypt, Cyprus and Iraq. In 1942, the division was heavily engaged in the Western Desert Campaign and the First Battle of El Alamein. From late 1943 to the Japanese surrender in August 1945, it fought continuously from India through the length of Burma. After the end of the war, it was the first unit into Singapore and then fought pro-Independence forces in Eastern Java. The division was converted into a mountain division in 1963.

== History ==
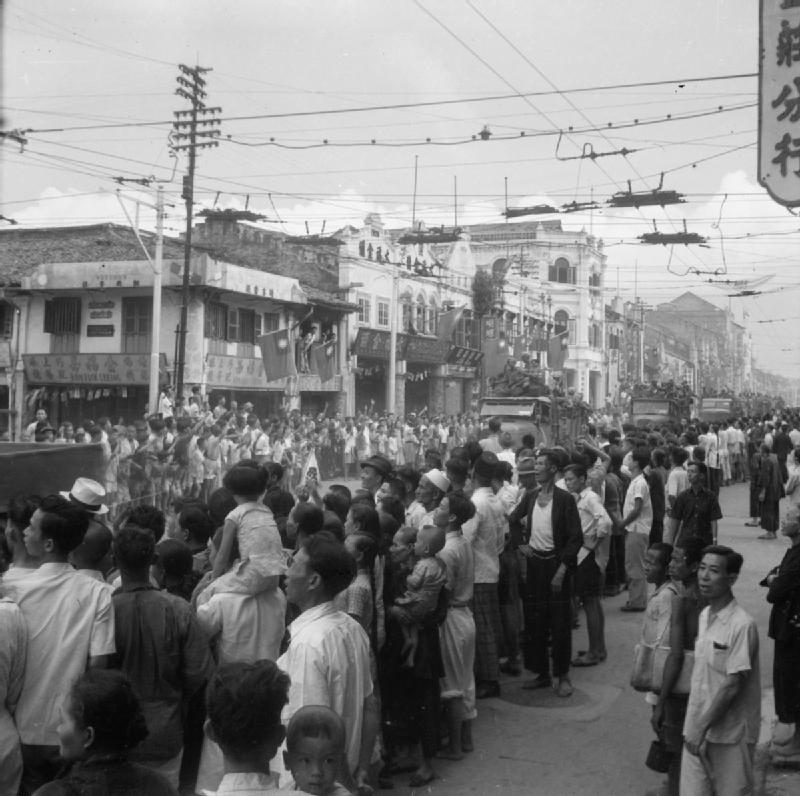
Cheering crowds welcome the 5th Indian Division after the liberation of Singapore, 1945.

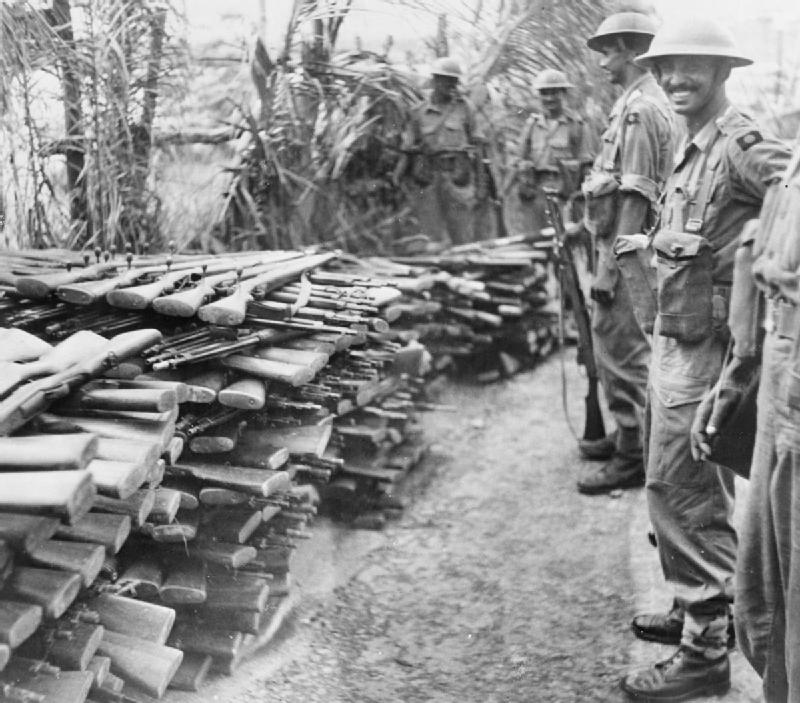
Troops of the 5th Indian Division guarding stockpiles of weapons handed in by surrendering Japanese forces in Singapore.

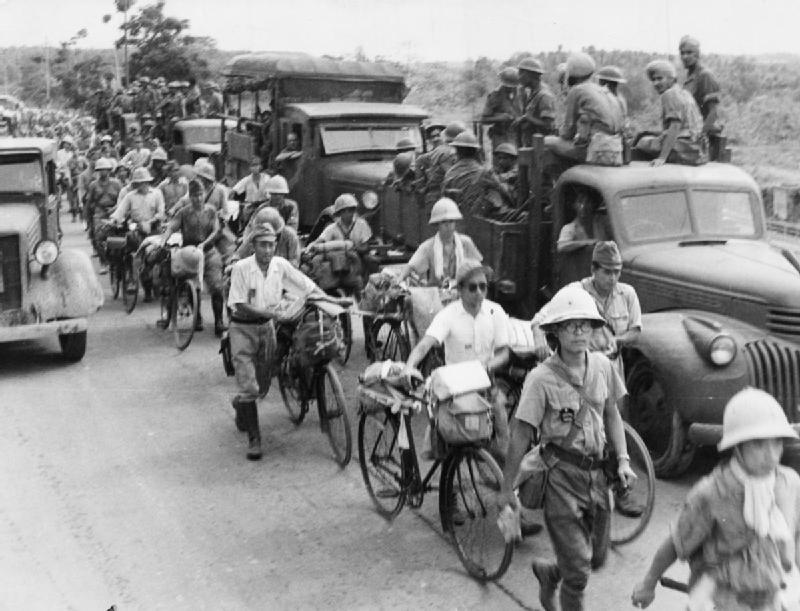
Disarmed Japanese soldiers, the officers still carrying their swords, march out of Singapore towards prisoner of war camps watched by troops of the 5th Indian Division.

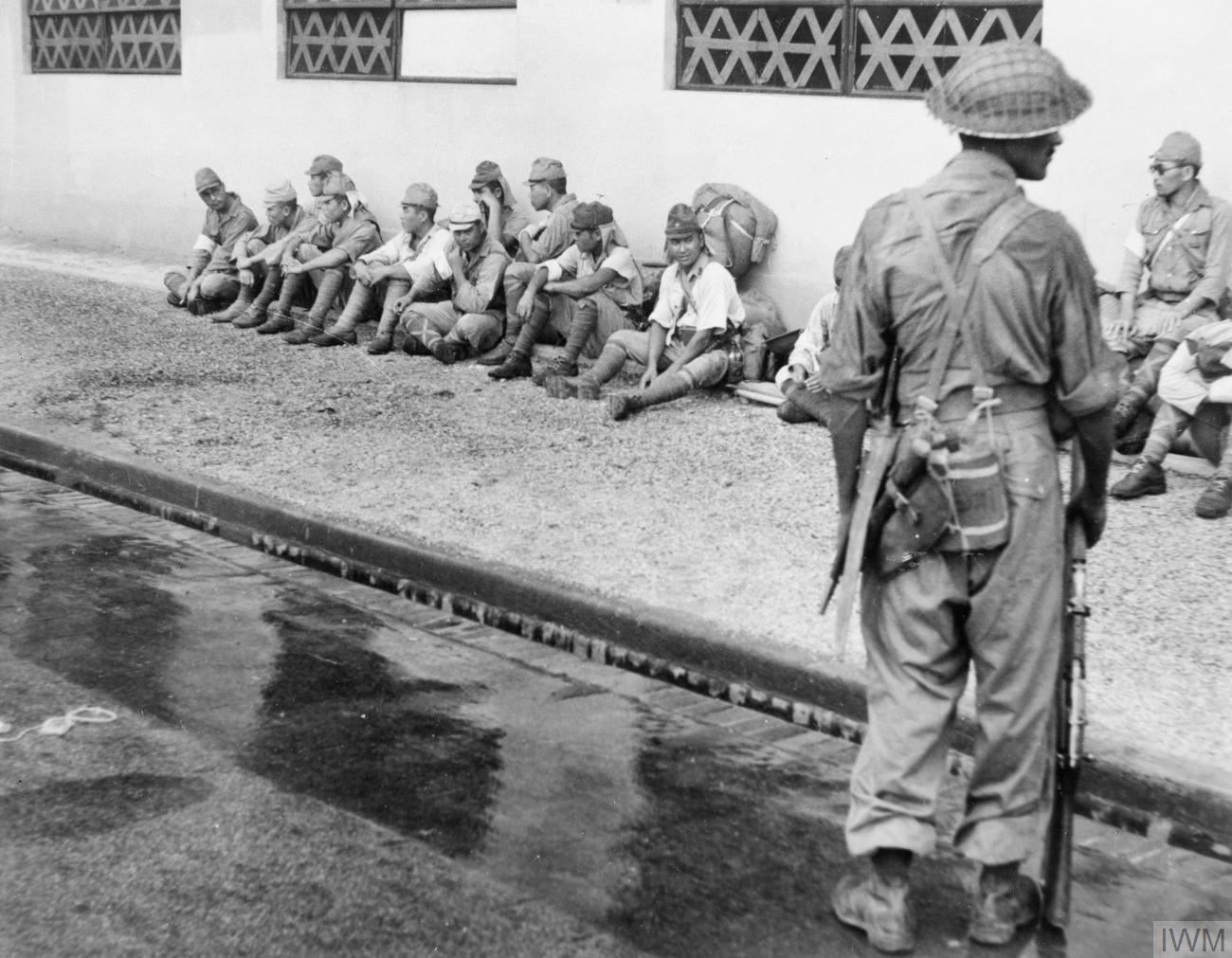
A soldier from the 5th Division stands guard over Japanese prisoners who surrendered during the liberation of Singapore. September 1945.

The division was raised at Secunderabad in India from the Deccan District Headquarters, with two brigades of three Indian infantry battalions each. It moved to the Sudan in 1940 and was joined by three British infantry battalions already there. The division was reorganised into three brigades each with one British and two Indian battalions (as was the prevailing custom).

The divisional sign of a red circle on a black background, which gave the division its nickname, was selected after the first selection of a boar's head was deemed offensive to Muslim soldiers and every other animal suggested had already been selected by other newly raised divisions.

Between 1940 and 1941, the 5th Division was involved in the campaign in East Africa. After periods in Egypt, Cyprus and Syria, by 1942 it was involved in the fighting in the Western Desert of North Africa and the withdrawal of the Allied troops to El Alamein. By late 1943, the 5th Division had been shipped to India and took part in the campaign in Burma, initially deployed to the Arakan front. After the Japanese had been defeated in the Battle of the Admin Box, the division was airlifted north to take part in the Battle of Imphal and the Battle of Kohima. Thereafter, the division was almost constantly involved in the advance through central Burma until fighting ended with the Japanese surrender in August 1945. After the end of the war, it was the first unit into Singapore and then fought pro-Independence forces in Eastern Java while protecting the recovery of Allied prisoners of war who had been incarcerated there.

Lord Louis Mountbatten wrote in his memoirs paying tribute to the division whose record was "second to none", saying

When the Division came under my command in South-East Asia towards the end of 1943, it had already had three years' hard fighting in Africa. In 1941 it had played a leading part in the defeat of the Italian Army in the Sudan, Eritrea, and Abyssinia; in the summer of 1942 it had been very heavily engaged with the Germans and Italians in the crucial battle of the Knightsbridge 'Cauldron,' and in the fighting withdrawal across North Africa to the defence of the Alamein line...when I first met the men of this Division, soon after the formation of the South-East Asia Command—indeed it was the first Division that I visited—its reputation was already high...the Division was heavily engaged in the first land battle to be fought since the Command had been set up...and a large share of the credit must go to the Fifth Indian Division for the first decisive victory against the Japanese since they had invaded two years previously...(the) land victory at Kohima and Imphal, in which the Division played an important part, proved to be the turning-point of the Burma Campaign...The Division continued to fight and to advance throughout the rest of the war, except for one period of rest and reorganization...Its record was second to none and I was proud to have such a fine formation under my command.

— Antony Brett-James

=== East African Campaign ===
The 5th Indian Division, under the command of Major-General Lewis Heath and comprising only two brigades at the time, was sent from India to the Sudan to reinforce the British forces there under Lieutenant-General Sir William Platt which had been attacked by Italian forces in Eritrea, at the time part of the Italian East African Empire. On 10 June 1940, before the arrival of the 5th Division, Platt had only three infantry battalions and the machine-gun companies of the Sudan Defence Force.

The 5th Division started to arrive in the Sudan in early September 1940 and absorbed Platt's three British infantry battalions (the 1st Battalion, Worcestershire Regiment, the 1st Battalion, Essex Regiment and the 2nd Battalion, West Yorkshire Regiment,) and formed a third infantry brigade. After these rearrangements, the division consisted of the 9th, 10th and 29th Indian Infantry Brigades.

For the next three months, the division was involved in a series of aggressive skirmishing operations to keep the Italian forces off balance and confused as to Platt's longer-term intentions. In early 1941, Platt's forces were further augmented by the 4th Indian Infantry Division, rushed from the Western Desert after the breakthrough during Operation Compass, and an attack was launched into Eritrea on 18 January. The climax of the campaign was the Battle of Keren, a fiercely fought series of engagements against superior numbers, which ended with victory for Platt's forces on 1 April.

After Keren, the 4th Indian Division was withdrawn to Cairo and the 5th Indian Division continued the campaign in Eritrea, finally joining up with elements of Lieutenant-General Alan Cunningham's forces, which had advanced north from Kenya to capture Italian Somaliland and the Italian capital of Addis Ababa in Ethiopia, to take the surrender of Prince Amedeo, Duke of Aosta, the Italian Viceroy, at Amba Alagi.

=== North Africa and the Middle East ===
9 and 10 Brigades of 5 Indian Division were newly stationed around Tobruk when Rommel's offensive against the Gazala Line commenced at the end of May 1942. Fresh to the desert, just recently equipped with obsolete anti tank guns and poor transport, they were ordered to counterattack (Operation Aberdeen) the German breakthrough. The operation was badly mismanaged by the Corps commander; tank and artillery support failed to materialise and casualties were crippling – every one of the West Yorks officers who participated was killed or wounded. The remnants were withdrawn first to Mersa Matruh then to the rudimentary defences at Alamein, where, reformed, they garrisoned the line, formed mobile 'Jock columns' and participated in successful counterattacks in the First Battle of El Alamein in July. After the Battle of Alam Halfa in August, they were withdrawn to garrison duties in Iraq before being shipped to Burma in mid-1943.

=== Burma campaign ===
At the end of 1943, the division began to take part in the Burma Campaign. It was facing the Japanese 55th Division on the coastal flank of the Arakan front. The defeat of the Japanese 55th Division in the Battle of the Admin Box, to which a large share of the credit must go to the 5th Indian Infantry Division, was the first big victory against the Japanese since they had invaded Burma two years previously. From the victory in the Arakan sector, the 5th Indian Infantry Division was air-lifted to the central front. 161 Brigade joined XXXIII Corps, which was beginning to arrive at Dimapur, and fought in the Battle of Kohima; the remainder of the division reinforced IV Corps, whose land victory at Kohima and Imphal, in which the division played an important part, proved to be the turning-point of the Burma Campaign. Except for one period of rest and reorganization, the Indian 5th Division continued to fight and to advance throughout the rest of the war, and took part in the final thrust by IV Corps down to Rangoon.

=== Service after Burma ===
After service in Burma the division was the first unit to be landed in Singapore as part of Operation Tiderace and was later sent to Java as part of the Allied occupation of the Dutch East Indies. It saw heavy fighting during the Battle of Surabaya in November 1945.

=== Post 1947 ===
After the Sino-Indian War, the division was re-raised as a mountain division in 1963 and is currently headquartered at Rupa, in Arunachal Pradesh. Units of the erstwhile wartime division were absorbed into Jammu Division during the India-Pakistan War of 1947-1948; the Jammu Division was later renamed as the 26th Infantry Division.

== Formation during World War II ==
General Officer Commanding:

- Major-General Lewis Heath (Jul 1940 – Apr 1941)
- Major-General Mosley Mayne (Apr 1941 – May 1942)
- Brigadier Claude M. Vallentin (May 1942)
- Major-General H.R. Briggs (May 1942 – Jul 1944)
- Major-General Geoffrey Evans (Jul – Sep 1944)
- Brigadier Robert Mansergh (Sep 1944)
- Major-General Cameron Nicholson (Sep 1944)
- Major-General Dermot Warren (Sep 1944 – Feb 1945)
- Brigadier Joseph A Salomons (Feb 1945)
- Major-General Robert Mansergh (Feb – Aug 1945)

=== Headquarters ===
- 1st Duke of York's Own Lancers (Skinner's Horse) (Divisional Reconnaissance Regiment) (to April 1942)
- The Guides Cavalry (10th Queen Victoria's Own Frontier Force) (from 1942 to ?)
- Royal Artillery

Commanders divisional artillery:

- Brigadier Claude M. Vallentin (Jul 1940 – Jun 1942)
- Brigadier Robert Mansergh (Jun 1942 – Sep 1944)
- Brigadier Geoffrey B.J. Kellie (Sep 1944 – Jun 1945)
- Brigadier R.G. Loder-Symonds (Jun – Aug 1945)
  - HQ
  - 4th Field Regiment, Royal Artillery
  - 28th Field Regiment, Royal Artillery
  - 144th Field Regiment, Royal Artillery
  - 56th (King's Own) Anti-Tank Regiment, Royal Artillery
  - 24th Indian Mountain Regiment, Indian Artillery
- Indian Engineers: Sappers and Miners
  - 2nd and 74 Field Companies, King George V's Own Bengal Sappers and Miners
  - 20 Field Company, Royal Bombay Sappers and Miners
  - 44 Field Park Company, Queen Victoria's Own Madras Sappers and Miners
- 5th Indian Division Signals
- Machine Gun Battalion, 17th Dogra Regiment

=== 9th Indian Infantry Brigade ===
Commanders:

- Brigadier Theophilus J. Ponting (Sep 1939)
- Brigadier Mosley Mayne (Sep 1939 – Feb 1941)
- Brigadier Frank Messervy (Feb – Apr 1941)
- Brigadier Bernard Campbell Fletcher (Apr 1941 – Jul 1942)
- Brigadier William H. Langran (Jul 1942 – Jan 1944)
- Lieutenant-Colonel Joseph A. Salomons (Jan – Feb 1944)
- Brigadier Geoffrey Evans (Feb 1944)
- Brigadier Joseph A. Salomons (Feb 1944 – Mar 1945)
- Lieutenant-Colonel K. Bayley (Mar 1945)
- Brigadier Hubert G.L. Brain (Mar – Aug 1945)
  - HQ
  - 2nd Battalion, West Yorkshire Regiment
  - 3rd Battalion, 5th Mahratta Light Infantry (1940–1942)
  - 3rd Battalion, 9th Jat Regiment (1942–1946)
  - 3rd Royal Battalion, 12th Frontier Force Regiment (1940–1942)
  - 3rd Battalion, 14th Punjab Regiment (1942–1946)

=== 10th Indian Infantry Brigade (1940–1942) ===
Commanders:

- Brigadier Hugh R.C. Lane (Sep 1939)
- Brigadier William Slim (Sep 1939 – Jan 1941)
- Lieutenant-Colonel Bernard Campbell Fletcher (Jan – Mar 1941)
- Brigadier Thomas "Pete" Rees (Mar 1941 – Mar 1942)
- Brigadier Charles Hamilton Boucher (Mar – Jun 1942)
- Brigadier Arthur Holworthy (Jul – Oct 1942)
- Brigadier John A. Finlay (Oct 1942 – Feb 1944)
- Brigadier Terence N. Smith (Feb 1944 – Aug 1945)
  - HQ
  - 1st Battalion, Essex Regiment
  - 2nd Battalion, Highland Light Infantry
  - 4th Battalion, 10th Baluch Regiment
  - 3rd Battalion, 18th Royal Garhwal Rifles
  - 2nd Battalion, 4th Prince of Wales's Own Gurkha Rifles

=== 29th Indian Infantry Brigade (1940–1942) ===
Commanders:

- Brigadier John Charles Oakes Marriott (Oct 1940 – Oct 1941)
- Brigadier Denys Whitehorn Reid (Oct 1941 – Jun 1942)
  - HQ
  - 1st Battalion, Worcestershire Regiment
  - 3rd Battalion, 2nd Punjab Regiment
  - 1st Battalion, 5th Mahratta Light Infantry
  - 6th Royal Battalion, 13th Frontier Force Rifles

=== 123rd Indian Infantry Brigade (1942–1946) ===
Commanders:

- Brigadier Arthur Verney Hammond (Jun 1942 – Nov 1943)
- Brigadier Thomas John Willoughby Winterton (Nov 1943 – Feb 1944)
- Brigadier Geoffrey Evans(Feb – Jul 1944)
- Brigadier Eric J. Denholm-Young (Jul 1944 – Aug 1945)
  - HQ
  - 2nd Battalion, Suffolk Regiment
  - 2nd Battalion, 1st Punjab Regiment
  - 3rd Battalion, 2nd Punjab Regiment
  - 1st Battalion, 17th Dogra Regiment
  - 3rd Battalion, 9th Gurkha Rifles

=== 161st Indian Infantry Brigade (1942–1946) ===
Commanders:

- Brigadier William Donovan Stamer (Nov 1941 – May 1942)
- Brigadier Francis E.C. Hughes (May – Jul 1942)
- Lieutenant-Colonel D Barker (Jul 1942 – Jul 1943)
- Brigadier Dermot Warren (Jul 1943 – Sep 1944)
- Brigadier Robert G.C. Poole (Sep 1944 – Mar 1945)
- Brigadier E.H.W. "Harry" Grimshaw CB CBE DSO (Mar – Aug 1945)
  - HQ
  - 4th Battalion, Queen's Own Royal West Kent Regiment
  - 1st Battalion, 1st Punjab Regiment
  - 4th Battalion, 7th Rajput Regiment
  - 3rd Battalion, 4th Prince of Wales's Own Gurkha Rifles
  - 2nd Field Company, KGVO Bengal Sappers and Miners

=== Support units ===
- Royal Indian Army Service Corps
  - 15th, 17th and 29th M.T. Companies
  - 20th, 60th, 74th and 82nd Animal Transport Companies (Mule)
  - 238th, 239th and 240th GP Transport Companies
  - Composite Issue Units
- Medical Services
  - I.M.S-R.A.M.C-I.M.D-I.H.C-I.A.M.C
  - 10th, 21st, 45th and 75th Indian Field Ambulances
  - 5th Indian Division Provost Unit
- Indian Army Ordnance Corps
  - 5th Indian Division Sub Park
- Indian Electrical and Mechanical Engineers
  - 112th, 113th and 123rd Infantry Workshop Companies
  - 5th Indian Division Recovery Company

== Assigned brigades ==
All these brigades were assigned or attached to the division at some time during World War II:

- 7th Indian Infantry Brigade
- 9th Indian Infantry Brigade
- 10th Indian Infantry Brigade
- 29th Indian Infantry Brigade
- 5th Indian Infantry Brigade
- 1st South African Infantry Brigade
- British 161st Infantry Brigade
- 161st Indian Infantry Brigade
- 11th Indian Infantry Brigade
- 1st Free French Infantry Brigade
- 2nd Free French Infantry Brigade
- 18th Indian Infantry Brigade
- 7th Armoured Brigade
- 123rd Indian Infantry Brigade
- 89th Indian Infantry Brigade
- Lushai Brigade
- 33rd Indian Infantry Brigade

== See also ==
- Order of Battle, East African Campaign
