= Geoffrey Evans (British Army officer) =

British Army general (1901–1987)

Lieutenant-General Sir Geoffrey Evans KBE CB DSO & Two Bars DL
- Portrait photograph of Evans in 1947
- Born: 13 January 1901
- Died: 27 January 1987 (aged 86); Chelsea, London, England
- Military career
- Allegiance: United Kingdom
- Branch: British Army
- Service years: 1920–1957
- Rank: Lieutenant-General
- Nickname: "Geoff"
- Service number: 12895
- Unit: Royal Warwickshire Regiment
- Commands: Northern Command (1953–57); British Forces in Hong Kong (1951–52); 40th Infantry Division (1949–51); 42nd (Lancashire) Infantry Division (1947–48); Allied Land Forces, Siam (1946); 7th Indian Infantry Division (1944–46); 5th Indian Infantry Division (1944); 123rd Indian Infantry Brigade (1944); 9th Indian Infantry Brigade (1944); Staff College, Quetta (1942–43); 1st Battalion, Royal Sussex Regiment (1941–42)
- Conflicts: Second World War
- Awards: Knight Commander of the Order of the British Empire; Companion of the Order of the Bath; Distinguished Service Order & Two Bars; Mentioned in Despatches (5)
- Other work: Deputy Lieutenant of Greater London; Honorary Colonel 7th Battalion, Royal Warwickshire Regiment

Lieutenant-General Sir Geoffrey Charles Evans, KBE, CB, DSO & Two Bars, DL (13 January 1901 – 27 January 1987) was a senior British Army officer during the Second World War and the post-war era. He was highly regarded as both a staff and field officer and had the distinction of being awarded the Distinguished Service Order (DSO) on three occasions.

== Early life and military career ==
Geoffrey Evans who was educated at Aldenham School was, after attending the Royal Military College, Sandhurst, commissioned as a second lieutenant into the Royal Warwickshire Regiment on 24 December 1920. He was promoted to lieutenant in December 1922 becoming adjutant in his regiment from November 1926 to October 1929. In November 1934 he was seconded as adjutant to his regiment's 7th Battalion (a territorial unit) in the rank of temporary captain. This posting lasted until February 1936 by which time his captain's rank had been made permanent. He attended the Staff College, Camberley from 1936 to 1937. In February 1939, by this time promoted to major, he was seconded to the British Indian Army to take up an appointment as a staff captain.

== Second World War ==
=== Western Desert and East Africa ===
Following the outbreak of the Second World War, Evans was appointed, in February 1940, brigade major of 11th Indian Infantry Brigade which at the time was part of 4th Indian Infantry Division in the Western Desert Force on the Egypt–Libya border. The brigade saw action during Operation Compass, achieving complete surprise to take the Italian defensive encampment at Nibeiwa. Shortly after this action 4th Indian Division was withdrawn to the Sudan to meet the Italian threat in Eritrea. In the East African campaign the brigade saw action during the British counter offensive in early 1941 notably at Agordat and the Battle of Keren.

After Keren 4th Indian Division returned to Egypt in April 1941 and Evans was promoted to acting lieutenant-colonel and became commanding officer of the 1st Battalion, Royal Sussex Regiment, part of the division's 7th Indian Infantry Brigade. Evans next saw action in November 1941 during Operation Crusader. His battalion, supported by artillery and tanks, captured the key position of Omar Nuovo on the Egyptian-Libyan frontier and dug in. In late November the British armour was soundly defeated at Sidi Rezegh and Rommel's tanks advanced rapidly towards the border. With the road to Cairo seemingly open, Rommel was held back by the 4th Indian Division's dug-in artillery. By mid December, however, the Axis forces had been forced to withdraw from Cyrenaica to positions near El Agheila. During this period Evans and his battalion saw action against Italian units in the Jebel Akhdar hills.

In January 1942, when Rommel mounted a new offensive, 7th Indian Brigade became threatened with being cut off and isolated at Benghazi. Evans skilfully led Silver Group (his battalion expanded with the addition of armoured reconnaissance and artillery units) during 7 Brigade's successful breakout.

=== India, Burma and Siam ===
In April 1942 Evans was advanced to brigadier and appointed Commandant of the Staff College, Quetta in India. In October 1943 Evans became Brigadier on the General Staff or BGS at IV Corps at Imphal where the newly arrived army commander, William Slim was preparing for a decisive encounter with the Japanese. In February 1944 Evans became commanding officer of 9th Indian Infantry Brigade, part of 5th Indian Infantry Division which was fighting on Slim's Indian XV Corps front to the south in the Arakan. On the day of his arrival the Japanese launched their Ha-Go offensive resulting in loss of contact with 7th Indian Infantry Division's commander, Frank Messervy. Evans was ordered to hand over command of his brigade and make his way to 7th Indian Division's Admin Box at Sinzweya, take control and hold the position against attacks. Having ordered an infantry battalion and a mountain artillery regiment to follow him Evans arrived on foot to discover that the only fighting force in the box was a light Anti-Aircraft / Anti-Tank regiment. He quickly armed and organised the cooks, drivers and other support troops which were joined by the two units following from his brigade and some time later two squadrons of tanks and some further artillery and infantry. When Messervy arrived, he left the defence of the box to Evans so that he himself could concentrate on the direction of the rest of the division. For three weeks there was intense, often hand to hand, fighting during which the Japanese broke into the perimeter on a number of occasions. Slim and his commanders had developed tactics to counter Japanese infiltration and encirclement techniques by holding on to forward positions and tasking reserve formations to advance to relieve them. So, although the Admin Box was cut off, it was well supplied by air drop. Maintaining their forward positions also allowed the XV Corps to interfere with Japanese supplies which came exclusively overland. By the third week in February the Japanese force was starving and obliged to break off. By 24 February the siege of the Admin Box had been lifted.

Evans was then given command of 123rd Indian Brigade, also part of 5th Indian Division, which was flown from the Arakan to Imphal to reinforce IV Corps. The brigade played an active role in the heavy fighting during the Battle of Imphal. When, in July 1944, the 5th Division's commander, Harold Rawdon Briggs, was rested Evans was appointed acting major-general (his permanent rank having been advanced to lieutenant-colonel in June) and appointed general officer commanding (GOC) of the 5th Indian Infantry Division. By mid-September the division had fought its way in appalling monsoon conditions, over 120 miles (190 km) down the road towards Tiddim to cross the Manipur River when Evans contracted typhoid and was evacuated to India.

Three months later, having recovered his health, Evans resumed his service in IV Corps by taking command of the Indian 7th Infantry Division. By February 1945 the division found itself on the bank of the Irrawaddy River where it executed what Slim later described as, "the longest opposed river crossing attempted in any theatre of the Second World War." Having consolidated its position the division passed to XXXIII Indian Corps to advance down the Irrawaddy in operations which were later described by Slim as "...a brilliant piece of major tactics by Stopford [the Corps commander], his commanders, and their troops." In June the division was moved to the Sittang valley to rejoin IV Corps to become the southern end of the Allied barrier formed to prevent a break-out by the remnants of the Japanese 28th Army. In early July the division fought a fierce four-day battle on the Sittang as Japanese forces attempted to distract attention from their planned breakout further north. The battlefield was a swamp as a result of monsoon rains with 7th Division often having to report floods, "too deep for Gurkhas to operate."

When the Japanese surrendered in August 1945 7th Indian Division was flown into Siam where Evans became the GOC Allied Land Forces in Siam until 1946. In August 1945 his permanent rank was advanced from lieutenant-colonel to colonel. During the Second World War, Evans was appointed a Commander of the Order of the British Empire (1945), awarded the Distinguished Service Order (1941) and Two Bars (1942 and 1944), and Mentioned in Despatches five times. In the King's Birthday Honours of 1946, Evans was appointed a Companion of the Order of the Bath for his exploits in Burma.

== Post-war ==
After the war Evans was appointed General Officer Commanding 42nd (Lancashire) Division in 1947 and his temporary rank of major-general made permanent. He then went to be Director of Military Training at the War Office in 1948. He became General Officer Commanding 40th Division in Hong Kong in 1949 and then temporary Commander of British Forces in Hong Kong in 1951 as a temporary lieutenant-general. The appointment came to an end in January 1952.

Reverting to major-general, Evans became Assistant Chief of Staff (Organisation and Training) Supreme Headquarters Allied Powers Europe from March 1952 to April 1953 and then, once again as a temporary lieutenant-general, General Officer Commanding-in-Chief Northern Command from May 1953 to May 1957. He was confirmed in the permanent rank of lieutenant-general in October 1953. In the 1954 New Year Honours he was appointed a Knight Commander of the Order of the British Empire. He retired from the army in June 1957. In 1959 he published his account of the five great battles in which he was involved (The Desert and the Jungle).

== Publications ==
- Evans, Geoffrey (1948). Report of the British Guiana and British Honduras Settlement Commission, etc. London: HMSO. OCLC 558749771.
- —; Brett-James, Antony (1962). Imphal : a flower on lofty heights. London: Macmillan. OCLC 30280824.
- — (1959). The Desert and the Jungle. London: William Kimber. OCLC 66225972.
- — (1964). The Johnnies (British patrols behind the enemy lines in Burma, 1942–45). London: Cassell. OCLC 558852813.
- — (1970). Tannenberg, 1410:1914. London: Hamish Hamilton. ISBN 0241016835.
- — (1975). Kensington. London: Hamish Hamilton. ISBN 0241891078.

== Bibliography ==
- Brett-James, Antony (1951). Ball of fire – The Fifth Indian Division in the Second World War. Gale & Polden. Archived from the original on 27 March 2020.
- Mackenzie, Compton (1951). Eastern Epic. London: Chatto & Windus. OCLC 1412578.
- Mead, Richard (2007). Churchill's Lions: A biographical guide to the key British generals of World War II. Stroud (UK): Spellmount. pp. 132–135. ISBN 978-1-86227-431-0.
- Slim, William (1956). Defeat into Victory. London: Cassell. OCLC 253543428.
- Smart, Nick (2005). Biographical Dictionary of British Generals of the Second World War. Barnsley, U.K.: Pen & Sword Military. ISBN 1-84415-049-6.

Military offices
| Preceded by Alexander Osborne | Commandant of the Staff College, Quetta; 1942–1943 | Succeeded by Brian Chappel |
| Preceded by Harold Briggs | GOC 5th Indian Infantry Division; July–September 1944 | Succeeded by Dermot Warren |
| Preceded by Frank Messervy | GOC 7th Indian Infantry Division; 1944–1945 | Succeeded by Frederick Loftus-Tottenham |
| Preceded by John Aizlewood (as GOC 42nd Armoured Division) | GOC 42nd (Lancashire) Division; 1947–1948 | Succeeded by Vyvyan Evelegh |
| Preceded by Sir Robert Mansergh | Commander British Forces in Hong Kong; 1951–1952 | Succeeded by Sir Terence Airey |
| Preceded by Sir Philip Balfour | GOC-in-C Northern Command; 1953–1957 | Succeeded by Sir Richard Goodbody |
