= Battle of the Admin Box =

WW II Battle in February of 1944 in Burma

- Part of the Burma campaign in 1944 in the South-East Asian theatre of World War II
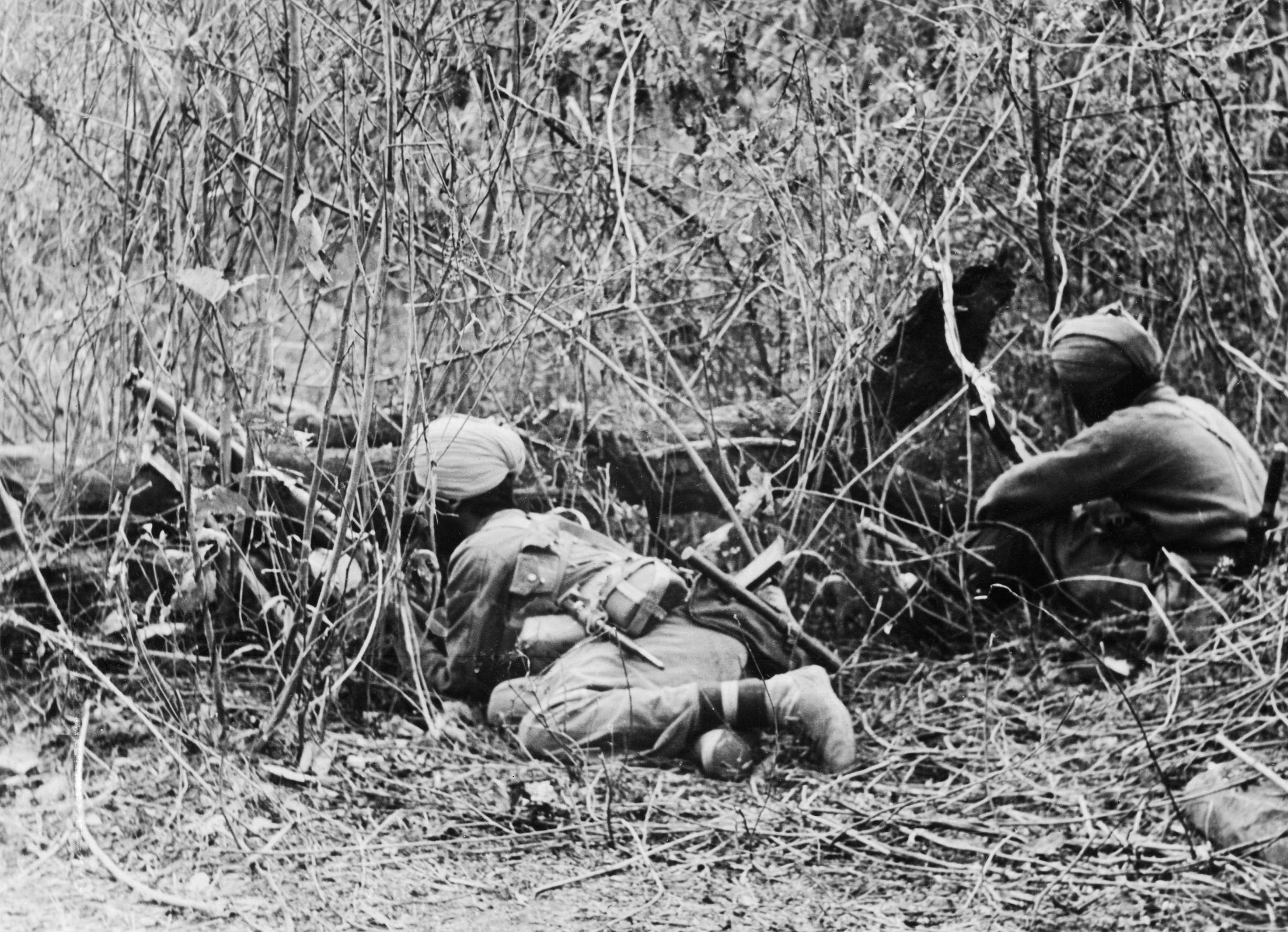
- Sikh troops of the 7th Indian Infantry Division man an observation post in the Ngakyedauk Pass area of the Arakan, Burma, 6 February 1944
Date	5–23 February 1944
Location	Arakan, Burma 20.932080°N 92.449349°E
Result	Allied victory

Belligerents
United Kingdom: (India) British Raj	(Empire of Japan) Japan: Azad Hind

Commanders and leaders
(United Kingdom) Philip Christison	(Empire of Japan) Tokutaro Sakurai

Strength
At start: 2 infantry divisions 1 armoured regiment Reinforcements: 2 infantry divisions	1 infantry division

Casualties and losses
3,506 total 3 Spitfires	3,106 killed 2,229 wounded 65 aircraft
- Sinzweya, Myanmar

The Battle of the Admin Box (sometimes referred to as the Battle of Ngakyedauk or the Battle of Sinzweya) took place on the southern front of the Burma campaign from 5 to 23 February 1944, in the South-East Asian Theatre of World War II.

Japanese forces attempted a local counter-attack against an Allied offensive with the aim of drawing Allied reserves from the Central Front in Assam, where the Japanese were preparing their own major offensive. After initial setbacks, the Allies recovered to thwart the Japanese attack, pioneering the methods which would lead to further Allied victories over the following year.

The battle takes its name from the "administration area" of the Indian Army's 7th Division, which became a makeshift, rectangular defensive position for Major-General Frank Messervy and his staff after their divisional headquarters was overrun on 7 February.

== Background ==
During 1941 and early 1942, the Japanese army had driven Allied troops (British, Indian and Chinese) from Burma. During 1943, the Allies had fought the Arakan Campaign 1942–1943 a limited offensive into Arakan, the coastal province of Burma. The aim had been to secure Akyab Island at the end of the Mayu Peninsula. The island possessed an important airfield, from which the Japanese Army Air Force had raided Calcutta and other Indian cities, and which also featured prominently in Allied plans to recapture Burma.

This offensive had failed disastrously. Because the British Indian Army was being massively expanded, most of the Indian (and British) units committed to the attack lacked training and experience. Exhausted units were left in the front line, and their morale declined. Allied tactics and equipment were not suited to the jungle-covered hills, and Japanese units repeatedly achieved surprise by crossing rivers and hills which the Allies had dismissed as impassable. Finally, the Allied command structure was inefficient, with an overworked division headquarters trying to control a large number of sub-units and also a large Line of communications area. During the following months, the Allies reorganised, engaged in extensive jungle training, and prepared for a renewed effort in 1944. Under the Fourteenth Army, the offensive was to be launched by XV Corps (Lieutenant General Philip Christison).

=== Second Allied offensive ===
The Mayu Peninsula consisted of a coastal plain, indented by several chaungs (tidal creeks), and separated from the fertile valley of the Kalapanzin River by the jungle-covered Mayu Range of hills. The 5th Indian Infantry Division (Major-General Harold Briggs), which had fought in East Africa and the Western Desert, attacked down the coastal plain. The well-trained 7th Indian Infantry Division (Major-General Frank Messervy) attacked down the Kalapanzin Valley. The 81st (West Africa) Division was advancing further east down the Kaladan River valley but would not directly affect the battle. The 36th Infantry Division in Calcutta and 26th Indian Infantry Division at Chittagong, were in reserve.

The advance began cautiously at first, but steadily gained momentum. On 9 January 1944, 5th Indian Infantry Division captured the small port of Maungdaw. While they reduced Japanese positions south of the port (the village of Razabil and a hill known from its shape as the "Tortoise"), the corps prepared to take the next major objective. This was part of the Mayu Range where two disused railway tunnels provided a route through the hills linking Maungdaw to the towns of Buthidaung and Letwedet in the Kalapanzin Valley. To reposition troops and resources for this attack, the engineers of the 7th Indian Division improved a narrow track, known as the Ngakyedauk Pass ("Okeydoke Pass"), across the hills while a large administration area, later to be known as the Admin Box, was established at Sinzweya near the eastern end of the pass.

=== Japanese plans ===
The Twenty-Eighth Army (Lieutenant General Shōzō Sakurai), defended Arakan and southern Burma. Its 55th Division (Lieutenant General Tadashi Hanaya) occupied Arakan. Most of the division's troops (five battalions) were grouped as Sakurai Force in the Mayu area, under its Infantry Group headquarters commanded by Major-General Tokutaro Sakurai, no relation to the Army commander. (A Japanese division had a separate headquarters to administer its infantry units which, as in this case, could take tactical control of any substantial detachment from the division.) The Japanese were confident that they could repeat their success of the previous year in a local counter-attack, and perhaps even advance on Chittagong, the port on which XV Corps relied for supplies. Also, it was intended that by launching their attack (given the name Ha-Go or Operation Z) in the first week of February, they would force the Allies to send reinforcements to Arakan from the Central Front, thus clearing the way for the main Japanese offensive there, planned to begin in the first week of March.

== Battle ==
=== Japanese advances ===
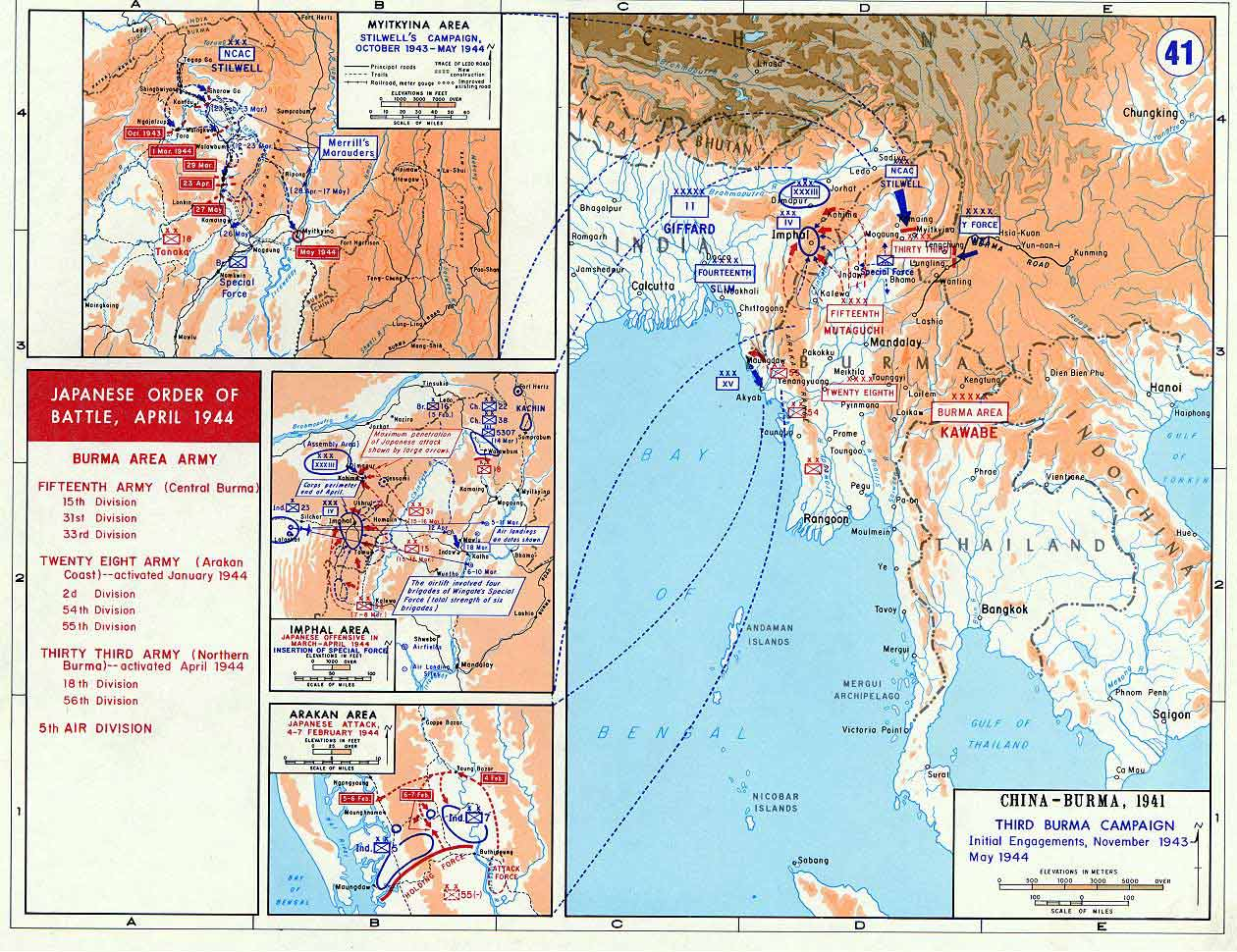
Third Burma Campaign October 1943 – May 1944

Beginning on 5 February, Sakurai Force infiltrated the front lines of the 7th Indian Division, which was widely dispersed, and moved north undetected on the small town of Taung Bazaar. Here they crossed the Kalapanzin River and swung west and south, and on the early morning of the 6 February they attacked the HQ of 7th Division at Luang Cheng a few miles to the south-west of Taung. The HQ was up on a hillock. There was heavy close fighting, but 7th Division's signallers and clerks eventually had to destroy their documents and equipment and split up into small parties and retreat to the Admin Box. (Other radio operators listening on the division's frequency heard a voice say, "Put a pick through that radio", then silence.) The Motor Transport, with 22 radio sets, had already been sent to the Administrative Area which was being turned into a defensive box, and the HQ Defence battalion sent to intercept Japanese to the north

Sakurai's force then followed up towards Sinzweya and the rear of 7th Division. A Japanese battalion (I/213 Regiment, known as Kubo Force from its commander), crossed the Mayu Range at a seemingly impossible place, to set ambushes on the coastal road by which the 5th Indian Division was supplied. The Japanese still holding Razabil and the railway tunnels area (Doi Force) launched a subsidiary attack to link up with Sakurai, and made smaller raids and diversions, while unexpectedly large numbers of Japanese fighter aircraft flew from Akyab to contest the skies over the battlefield. It was evident to all of XV Corps that the situation was serious. However, the Fourteenth Army had spent much time considering counters to the standard Japanese tactics of infiltration and encirclement. The forward divisions of XV Corps were ordered to dig in and hold their positions rather than retreat, while the reserve divisions advanced to their relief. East of the Kalapanzin, on the far side of the river Sakurai Force had crossed at Taung Bazaar, the 114th Indian Infantry Brigade under Brigadier Michael Roberts was more isolated than any other part of 7th Division. Like the other forward troops, it held its positions, forming a defended base around its own administrative area. From there it attacked Japanese troops who had established themselves to its north, towards Taung Bazaar, and sent offensive patrols south towards Buthidaung.

The next obvious objective for the Japanese was the administrative area at Sinzweya, defended by headquarters and line of communication troops, with 25 Light AA / Anti Tank Regiment, RA. As Messervy was in the jungle, out of contact and possibly dead, Christison, the corps commander, ordered Brigadier Geoffrey Evans, who had recently been appointed commander of 9th Indian Infantry Brigade, part of the 5th Indian Division, to make his way to the Admin area, assume command and hold the position against all attacks. Christison also ordered 5th Division to send 2nd Battalion, the West Yorkshire Regiment (from Evans brigade) over the Ngakyedauk pass and two batteries of 25th Mountain Artillery Regiment IA. The most vital reinforcements of all were two squadrons of M3 Medium tanks (Note: although the M3 Medium had been a stop-gap produced until a better tank could be design and built (the M4 Sherman) it was well-armoured and equipped with a 75mm gun, a 37mm gun and two machine guns) of the 25th Dragoons who crossed the pass on the night of the 4/5 February. The defenders were later joined by part of the 4th Battalion of the 8th Gurkha Rifles (from the 89th Indian Infantry Brigade, part of 7th Indian Division) and also the artillery of 8 (Belfast) Heavy Anti-Aircraft Regiment Royal Artillery and 6 Medium Regiment RA.

=== Defence of the Admin Box ===
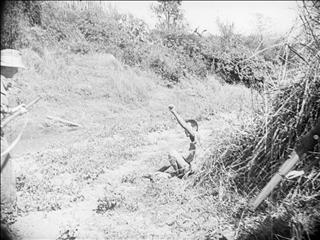
After the headquarters of 7th Indian Division is surrounded by the Japanese, Allied tanks and infantry fight to break the encirclement and a number of prisoners are taken.

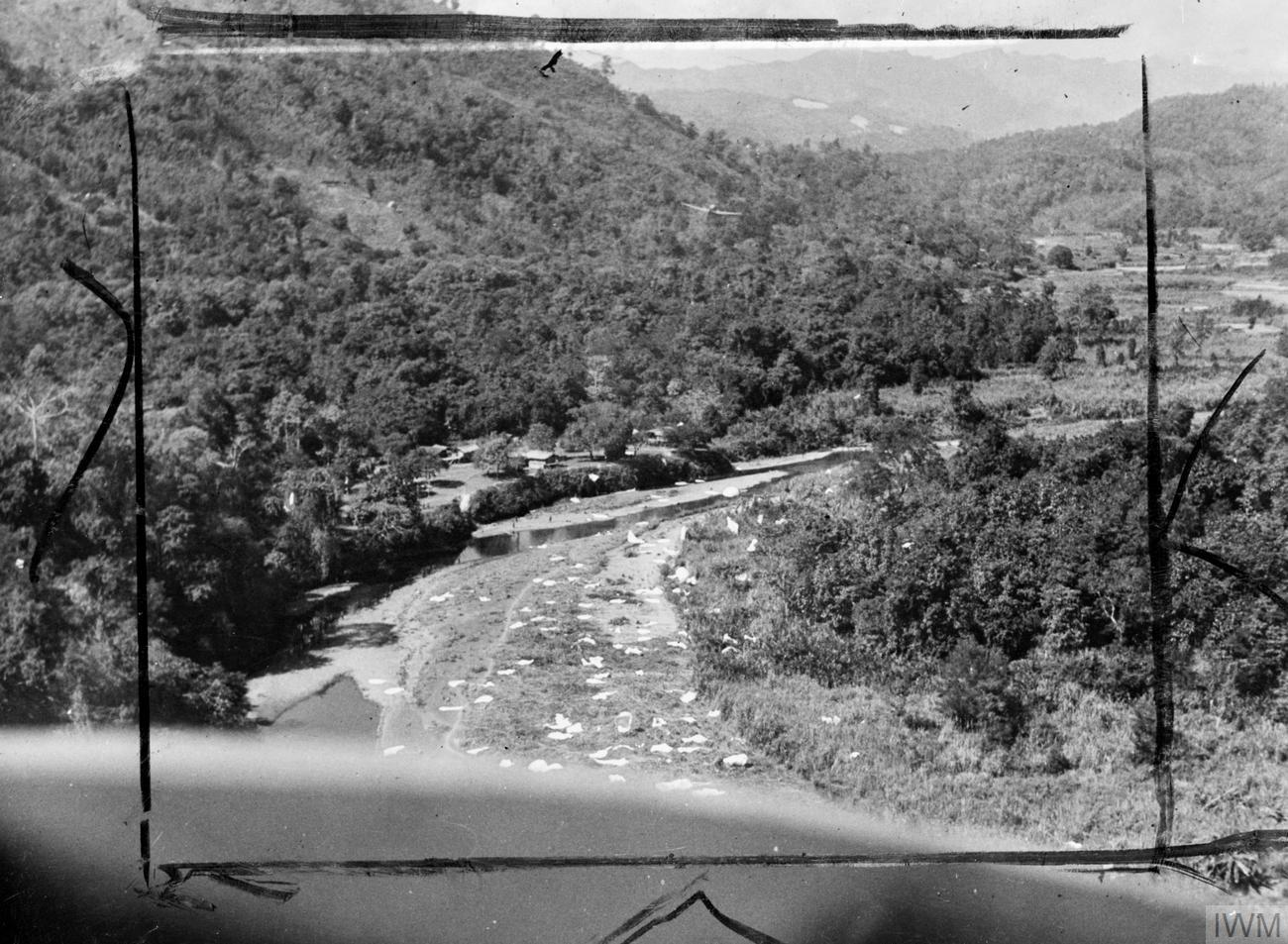
View behind Dakota aircraft after dropping supplies for 7th Indian Division into a dry river bed near Sinzweya

Under Evans, drawing on his experience of the war in North Africa, the area was converted into a defended area. He established a quick perimeter turning it into a "box" similar to those of the Western Desert fighting. Two squadrons, B and C, of the 25th Dragoons were ordered back from a position to the north-east between 7th Division and the Admin Area; A squadron was with 5th Division on the other side of the Mayu range. 9th Brigade HQ ("Sally" Solomons and his staff) arrived and set up.

The site was about 1,200 yards (1.1 km) square. The majority of the ground was dry paddy fields separated by clay earth bund walls. Ammunition dumps were piled up at the foot of the western face of a scrub-covered central hillock, 150 feet (46 m) high and 200 yards long north-south, named "Ammunition Hill" with rations and other stores on the eastern side. To the south of the Ngakyedauk Chaung (which crossed east to west across the site) was the larger "Artillery Hill". Further supply dumps were across the site and there was a mule park and Motor Transport park with workshops. The Main Dressing Station, a field hospital in tents, was on a low hillock on the edge of the jungle between a southwards heading chaung and the pass. When Messervy reached the Admin Box, followed by several of his HQ personnel who had made their way in small parties through Japanese forces, he left the defence of the Box to Evans while he concentrated on re-establishing control over and directing the rest of the division.

From 11 February RAF and USAAF Douglas Dakota transport aircraft parachute-dropped rations and ammunition to the troops, including the defenders of the Admin Box. They flew a 714 sorties, dropping 2,300 long tons (2,300 t) of supplies. The Japanese had not foreseen this development. While they ran short of supplies, the Indian formations could fight on. The Japanese tried to supply Sakurai Force with a convoy of pack mules and Arakanese porters, following the route of Sakurai's original infiltration but this was ambushed and the supplies were captured.

The first air-drop missions met opposition from Japanese fighters and some transport aircraft were forced to turn back but three squadrons of Supermarine Spitfires, operating from new airfields around Chittagong, gained air superiority over the battlefield. Sixty-five Japanese aircraft were claimed shot down or damaged for the loss of three Spitfires (though the Japanese fighters also shot down several Hawker Hurricane fighter-bombers and other aircraft.) Whatever the true figures, the Japanese fighters were quickly driven from the area.

On the ground, the fighting for the Admin Box was severe and for the most part hand to hand. On the night of 7 February, some Japanese troops captured the divisional Main Dressing Station. In what was undoubtedly a war crime, thirty-five medical staff and patients were murdered. This may have increased the resolve of the defenders who were now aware what fate would befall them if they surrendered. The following morning, a company of the West Yorks with tank support attacked the MDS.

On 8 February, a company (about 110 men) of Japanese infantry was wiped out trying to infiltrate the box along a nullah (afterwards named "Blood Nullah"). Maps and other documents were recovered from a Japanese officer; they turned out to be a full set of operations orders for Ha-Go with troop timetables and sites marked where Japanese would form up before beginning an attack.

On Wednesday 9th, Spitfires (the new Mark VIII flown by No. 81 Squadron from Imphal) and Hurricanes (No. 28 Squadron) engaged Japanese aircraft. Over 100 men of the 7/2nd Punjabi Infantry (of the 89th Brigade) reached the box that day and were sent south to 33rd Brigade.

Japanese fire caused heavy casualties in the crowded defences and twice set ammunition dumps on fire. All attempts to overrun the defenders were thwarted by the tanks, to which the Japanese had no counter once their few mountain guns were out of ammunition. The Japanese tried an all-out attack on the night of 14 February and captured a hill on the perimeter. The 2nd West Yorkshire with support from the tanks recaptured it the next day, although they suffered many casualties.

=== Japanese retreat ===
By 22 February, the Japanese had been starving for several days. Colonel Tanahashi, commanding the Japanese 112th Infantry Regiment, which provided the main body of Sakurai's force, stated that his regiment was reduced to 400 men out of an original strength of 2,150 and refused to make further attacks. On 24 February (19 February by other sources), he broke radio communications and retreated without authorisation. On 26 February, Sakurai was forced to break off the operation. When the offensive ended, the 114th Brigade was back on its original line, ready to resume the advance.. The 26th Indian Division had relieved 5th Division, which sent a brigade to break through the Ngakyedauk Pass to relieve 7th Division. Kubo force was cut off and suffered heavy casualties trying to return to Japanese lines.

== Aftermath ==
Although total Allied casualties were higher than the Japanese, the Japanese had been forced to abandon many of their wounded to die. Five thousand Japanese dead were counted on the battlefield. For the first time in the Burma campaign, Japanese tactics had been countered and indeed turned against them. This was to be repeated on a far larger scale in the impending Battle of Imphal. In terms of morale also, the fact that British and Indian soldiers had held and defeated a major Japanese attack for the first time was widely broadcast.

The value of Allied air power had been demonstrated and was to be a vital factor in the overall Allied victory in the Burma campaign. At the Japanese surrender meetings in Rangoon on 11 September 1945, Major General Ichida read a statement which identified two unforeseen and vital factors which had put the Japanese at a "disastrous disadvantage":

(a) Allied air supply, which permitted ground forces in Burma to consolidate their positions without being forced to retreat and thus rendered the enemy's infiltration and encircling tactics abortive.
(b) Allied air superiority, which so disrupted Japanese supply lines, both in Burma and further afield, that starvation and illness overtook thousands of Japanese troops facing Fourteenth Army and also denied them the essential supplies of fuel, equipment and material with which to fight a better equipped and supplied, Allied Force.

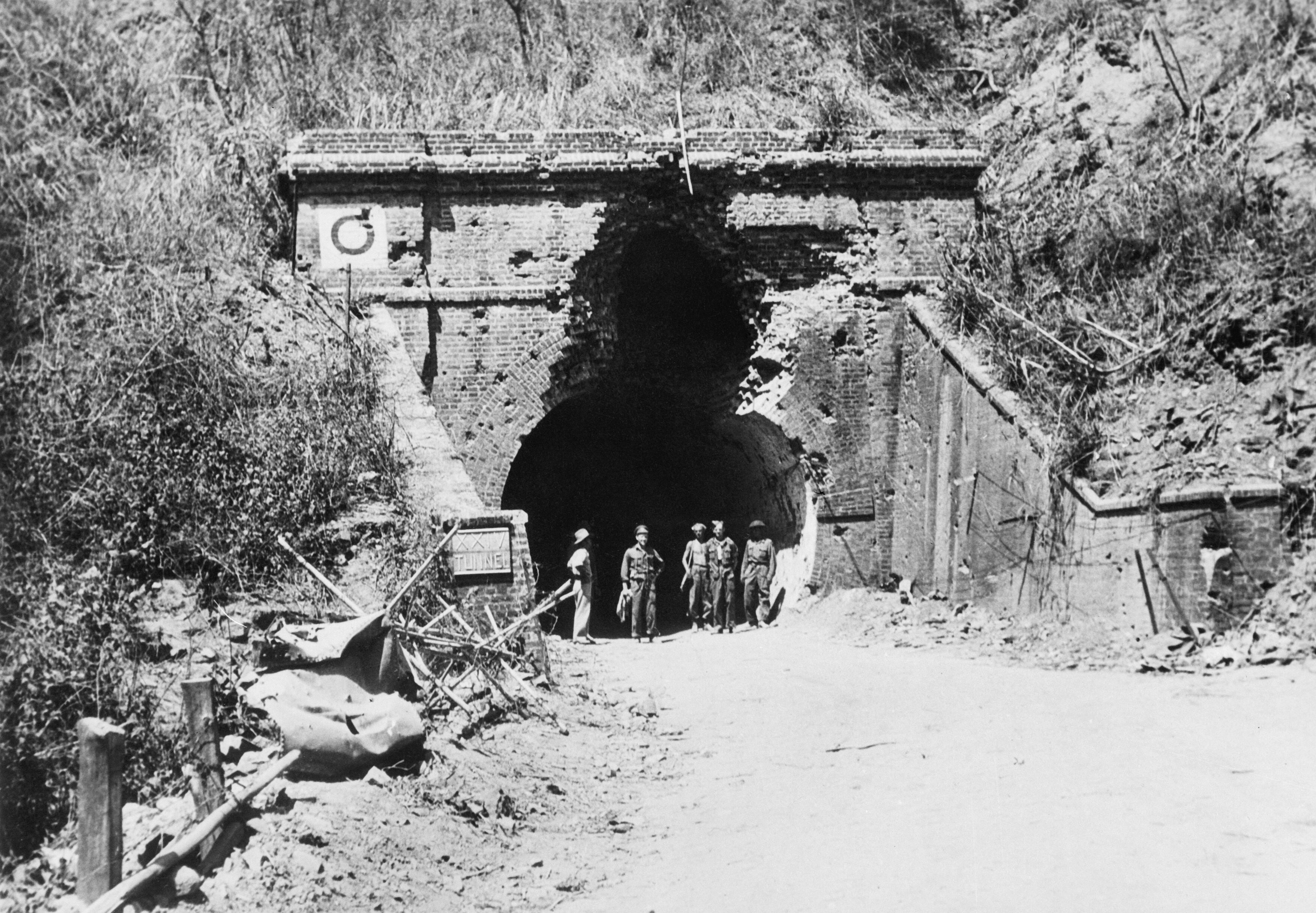
Entrance to one of the disused railway tunnels on the Maungdaw–Buthidaung road, captured by Allied troops in March 1944

In the second week of March, the 161st Indian Infantry Brigade (part of the 5th Division) finally captured the "Tortoise" and the other fortifications around Razabil by a flanking manoeuvre, before the division was withdrawn into reserve. The 26th Indian and 36th British divisions resumed the offensive in late March and early April. The 36th Division captured the railway tunnels by 4 April. On 6 April, troops from the 26th Division captured a vital hill, named Point 551, which dominated the area and where the Japanese had won an important victory just under a year earlier.

At this point, XV Corps' operations were curtailed to free transport aircraft and troops for the Imphal battle. As the monsoon began, it was found that the low-lying area around Buthidaung was malarial and unhealthy and the Allies actually withdrew from the area to spare themselves losses to disease. The Japanese had moved the 54th Division to Arakan, and concentrated a force of four battalions under Colonel Koba of the 111th Infantry Regiment against the 81st (West African) Division in the Kaladan Valley. With support from a unit of the Indian National Army and local Arakanese, this force mounted a successful counter-attack against the isolated West African division, forcing it to retreat and eventually withdraw from the valley.

Akyab remained in Japanese hands until January 1945, when a renewed Allied advance combined with amphibious landings drove the Japanese from Arakan, inflicting heavy casualties by landing troops to cut off their retreat down the coast.

== Indian National Army contribution ==
The lightly armed 1st battalion of the Indian National Army's 1st Guerrilla Regiment had been directed to participate in the Japanese diversionary attack. They left Rangoon in early February, but by the time they reached Akyab in early March, the Japanese offensive was nearing its end. The battalion subsequently marched up the Kaladan river and progressed slowly but successfully against Commonwealth African units before crossing the Burma-India border to occupy Mowdok, near Chittagong.

James Holland notes the presence of INA troops around the dressing station and their apparent participation in the attack and subsequent massacre – this based on the testimony of an Indian Army doctor captured during the attack and earmarked for conscription into the INA by the Japanese.

== Notable awards ==
- Major Charles Ferguson Hoey of the 1st Battalion, The Lincolnshire Regiment was posthumously awarded the Victoria Cross, for conspicuous valour during the fighting at the Ngakyedauk Pass.
- Brigadier Michael Roberts, commanding the 114th Indian Infantry Brigade, received an immediate award of the Distinguished Service Order for his command of the brigade during the Japanese counter-offensive.

== Bibliography ==
- Allen, Louis (1984). Burma: The Longest War. Dent. ISBN 0-460-02474-4.
- Brett-James, Anthony. "Ball of Fire:The Fifth Indian Division in the Second World War". Archived from the original on 1 February 2020.
- Fay, Peter W. (1993). The Forgotten Army: India's Armed Struggle for Independence, 1942–1945. Ann Arbor: University of Michigan. ISBN 0-472-08342-2.
- Fraser, David (1999). And we Shall Shock them: The British Army in the Second World War. Cassell military. ISBN 978-0-304-35233-3.
- Holland, James (2016). Burma '44. Bantam Press. ISBN 978-0-593-07585-2.
- Jeffreys, Alan (2005). The British Army in the Far East 1941–45. Oxford: Osprey. ISBN 978-1-84176-790-1.
- Latimer, Jon (2004). Burma: The Forgotten War. John Murray. ISBN 0-7195-6576-6.
- Leyin, John (2000). Tell Them of Us: The Forgotten Army – Burma. Stanford-le-Hope: Lejins. ISBN 0-9528789-3-3.
- Mead, Richard (2007). Churchill's Lions: A Biographical Guide to the Key British Generals of World War II. Stroud (UK): Spellmount. pp. 132–135. ISBN 978-1-86227-431-0.
- Moreman, Tim R. (2005). The Jungle, the Japanese and the British Commonwealth Armies at War, 1941-45. Frank Cass. pp. 109–124. ISBN 0-7146-4970-8.
- "Keith Park (August 1946) Air Operations in South East Asia 3rd May 1945 to 12 September 1945". The London Gazette (Supplement). No. 39202. 13 April 1951. pp. 2127–2172.
- Roberts, M. R. (1952). Golden Arrow: The Story of the 7th Indian Division in the Second World War 1939-1945. Aldershot: Gale & Polden.
- Slim, William (1956). Defeat into Victory. London: Cassell. OCLC 253543428.
- Turnbull, Patrick (1979). Battle of the Box. London: Ian Allan. ISBN 9780711009424.
- Woodburn Kirby, Stanley (2004) [1961]. The War against Japan: The Decisive Battles. History of the Second World War, United Kingdom Military Series. Vol. III. with C.T. Addis, M.R. Roberts, G. T. Wards, N.L. Desoer (facs. repr. Naval & Military, Uckfield ed.). London: HMSO. ISBN 1-845740-62-9..
