= Military operations other than war (UK) =

War deterrence and conflict de-escalation activities

British military operations other than war (MOOTW) focus on deterring war, resolving conflict, promoting peace, and supporting civil authorities in response to domestic crises.

The MOTW strategic paradigm evolved slowly.

== Malaya ==
The evolution of British tactics in the Malayan Emergency (1948-1960) illustrates lessons learned the hard way; and eventually, the British developed a strategy with elements similar to "military operations other than warfare." principles. In a sense, events in Malaya anticipated the current doctrine. Ultimately, the way in which political and military leaders defined their roles and synchronized their policies and operations produced measurable results. The British initially failed to appreciate the complex nature of counterinsurgency and equally complex measures which are required to combat it.

Subsequent operations built from a foundation consisting of what had been learned (and what had not been learned) in 1948–1950.

Lieutenant General Sir Harold Briggs is credited with articulating the twin goals which have evolved into a British doctrine over the course of time. The Briggs Plan (June 1950) proposed "two key goals to accomplish in order to end the insurgency--first, to protect the population, and second to isolate them from the guerrillas."

== Bosnia ==
British peacekeeping troops in Bosnia in the late 1990s attended to similar objectives in order to assist the population in re-establishing "normality."

== Selected British deployments ==
- 1948-1960 Malayan Emergency.
- 1995 post-Bosnian War (1995 NATO bombing campaign in Bosnia and Herzegovina).
