= Bernard Campbell Fletcher =

British Army officer (1898–1968)

Brigadier Bernard Campbell Fletcher DSO MC
- Born: 17 June 1898
- Died: 1966 (aged 68)
- Military career
- Allegiance: United Kingdom
- Branch: British Army
- Service years: 1916–1948
- Rank: Brigadier
- Service number: 13785
- Unit: Highland Light Infantry
- Commands: 9th Indian Infantry Brigade (1941–1942); 2nd Battalion, Highland Light Infantry (1938–1941)
- Conflicts: First World War; Russian Civil War; Arab revolt in Palestine; Second World War
- Awards: Distinguished Service Order; Military Cross; Mentioned in Despatches

Brigadier Bernard Campbell Fletcher, DSO, MC (17 June 1898 – August 1966) was an officer of the British Army active during the First and Second World Wars.

== Military career ==
Fletcher was born on 17 June 1898 and was commissioned as a second lieutenant from the Royal Military College, Sandhurst into the British Army's Highland Light Infantry on 7 April 1916. Valentine Blomfield, later a major general, was a fellow graduate. During the First World War he served in France and Belgium from 21 December 1917 to 23 April 1918, then from 21 June 1918 to 11 November 1918. He won the Military Cross (gazetted in March 1919), and was gassed with mustard gas. The citation for his Military Cross, published in the London Gazette in October 1919, read:

Lt. (A./Capt.) Bernard Campbell Fletcher, High. L.I., attd. 15th Bn. On the 29th September, 1918, in the attack on Le Tronquoy, he led his company through the village, gaining all of his objectives and capturing about ten machine guns and 60 prisoners. He then, reorganised his company himself, having lost all his platoon commanders. Later, his fine example was largely responsible for beating off two enemy counter-attacks, he firing a Lewis gun himself. Throughout he showed most marked courage and did splendid work.

After the war Fletcher spent periods in North Russia during the Russian Civil War (16 August to 1 October 1919), Egypt, Palestine and India, during which he learned to speak Arabic and Hindustani. In 1929 he returned to England, where he attended the Staff College, Camberley, after which he returned to his regiment in India. Between 25 July 1933 and 24 July 1937 he held an appointment as Staff Captain in India, and was promoted to major on 4 October 1935. At some point between 1937 and 1939 he served in Palestine during the Arab revolt. In 1938 he succeeded Horatio Berney-Ficklin in command of the 2nd Battalion, Highland Light Infantry, and his promotion to lieutenant colonel was gazetted 1 July 1939.

In the Second World War Fletcher and his battalion took part in the East African Campaign as an element of the 10th Indian Infantry Brigade, which formed part of 5th Indian Infantry Division. When the brigade's commander, Brigadier William Slim, was wounded on 21 January 1941 Fletcher was given temporary command until the arrival of a permanent replacement on 20 March. Reverting to his battalion command, Fletcher was subsequently given command of Fletcher Force, an ad hoc grouping of armour and mobile infantry created to advance into Keren at the end of the Battle of Keren and to exploit towards Asmara. He was then appointed to command Flitforce (a reference to his nickname), an ad hoc grouping created to pursue the retreating Italians towards Adigrat. On 13 April 1941, Fletcher was promoted to command the 9th Indian Infantry Brigade, also part of the 5th Indian Infantry Division, an appointment he held until 7 August 1942. For his service during the campaign Fletcher was awarded the Distinguished Service Order, and was mentioned in despatches.

Fletcher was Commanding Officer, Sub-Area, Middle East from 1942 to 1943 and assistant adjutant and quartermaster-general, Home Forces from 1943 to 1944. He was again appointed temporary colonel and temporary brigadier from 2 March 1944, and appointed Brigadier, General Staff British Army Staff, Washington D.C. from 1944 to 1945. He was next posted as assistant adjutant and quartermaster-general, Home Forces in 1945. He was posted to Norway in late 1945, where he supervised withdrawal of German forces. In mid-1946 he was sent to Hamburg. In January 1947 he transferred to Iserlohn and in July 1947 to Braunschweig. He retired from the army on in March 1948 and returned to UK with the honorary rank of brigadier. The last three sentences of this biography were added by his surviving daughter Caroline Dalton from personal memory.
