= Mosley Mayne =

British Indian Army general (1889–1955)

General Sir Mosley Mayne GCB CBE DSO
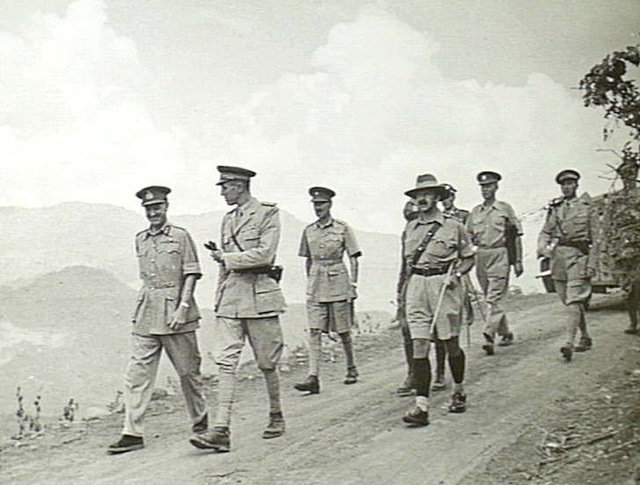
- Mayne (left) with Prince Amedeo (second from left) after the Battle of Amba Alagi in 1941
- Born: 24 April 1889; Wincanton, Somerset, England
- Died: 17 December 1955 (aged 66)
- Military career
- Allegiance: United Kingdom
- Branch: British Army; British Indian Army
- Service years: 1908–1947
- Rank: General
- Nickname: "Mo"
- Service number: 23034
- Units: East Lancashire Regiment; 6th (Inniskilling) Dragoons; 13th Duke of Connaught's Own Lancers (Watson's Horse); 9th Deccan Horse
- Commands: Royal Deccan Horse; 4th (Secunderabad) Cavalry Brigade; 9th Indian Infantry Brigade; 5th Indian Infantry Division; XXI Indian Corps; Eastern Command, India
- Conflicts: First World War; Second World War
- Awards: Knight Grand Cross of the Order of the Bath; Commander of the Order of the British Empire; Companion of the Distinguished Service Order; Mentioned in Despatches (3)

General Sir Ashton Gerard Oswald Mosley Mayne, GCB, CBE, DSO (24 April 1889 – 17 December 1955) was a senior British Indian Army officer active in both the First World War and Second World War, where he commanded Eastern Command, India.

== Early career ==
Born on 24 April 1889 and educated at Wellington College and the Royal Military College, Sandhurst, Mayne was commissioned as a second lieutenant on to the Unattached List, Indian Army on 9 September 1908. He arrived in India on 9 December 1908. After spending a year first attached to the British Army's East Lancashire Regiment then the 6th (Inniskilling) Dragoons he was accepted for the Indian Army on 9 December 1909 and appointed to the 13th Duke of Connaught's Own Lancers (Watson's Horse).

He was promoted to lieutenant on 9 December 1910. The regiment was stationed at Risalpur in 1914 for service, if needed, on the North West Frontier. On the outbreak of the First World War in 1914 the officer who held the appointment of adjutant was posted away and Mayne was temporarily appointed to the role. On 8 May 1915 the appointment was made permanent. He saw action against the Mohmands and the Swatis on the North West Frontier between August and October 1915, was promoted to temporary captain on 1 September 1915 and having his first taste of staff work being appointed temporary Staff Captain in India from 23 to 30 September 1915. The regiment was sent to Mesopotamia in July 1916, Mayne arriving on 25 August. He was to serve in Mesopotamia until the end of the war against Turkey on 31 October 1918 and was wounded.

He was promoted to substantive captain during this period, his seniority later being antedated to 1 September 1915. He was made a Companion of the Distinguished Service Order for service in Mesopotamia in the London Gazette, 25 August 1917. He was additionally mentioned in despatches in the London Gazettes of 15 August 1917, 18 February 1919 and 5 June 1919.

He was first appointed to the staff as a General Staff Officer III (GSO3) on 27 March 1918 on the staff of the 3rd Army Corps, Mesopotamian Expeditionary Force remaining there until 11 September 1918. He was then appointed a temporary major on the staff of the General Officer Commanding (GOC) the Cavalry Division, Mesopotamia Expeditionary Force from 26 September to 31 December 1918, then a GSO II with G.H.Q., Mesopotamian Expeditionary Force 1 January to 8 June 1919. He was appointed a brevet major (London Gazette 3 June 1919) for his services in Mesopotamia.

== Between the wars ==
He was posted back to India as a Deputy Assistant Quartermaster General Army Headquarters India from 9 June 1919 to 15 May 1920. He then went to England where he attended the Staff College, Camberley from 1921 to 1922. His regiment amalgamated with the 16th Cavalry in 1921 to form the 6th Duke of Connaught's Own Lancers (Watson's Horse). He was appointed a General Staff Officer 2nd grade 15 February 1922 to 11 June 1923 at Army Headquarters followed by appointment as an instructor at the Cavalry School, Saugor from 12 December 1923 to 10 November 1924. He was on leave on a medical certificate for one year to 19 September 1925. He served as a General Staff Officer 2nd grade at the War Office in London from 22 January 1927 to 22 January 1931. Promoted to Brevet Lieutenant Colonel on 1 July 1930, he attended the Imperial Defence College in 1933 and transferred to the 9th Royal Deccan Horse on 29 August 1933 as second in command and then was appointed lieutenant colonel and commanding officer (CO) of the regiment from 4 August 1934 to 2 June 1936.

He was promoted to local brigadier whilst officiating as director of military operations and intelligence 18 March 1936 to 3 June 1936 and temporary brigadier whilst appointed as director of military operations and intelligence, India, from 3 June 1936 to 17 September 1938, and retained the temporary rank when appointed to command the 4th (Secunderabad) Cavalry Brigade on 17 September 1938. The 4th (Secunderabad) Cavalry Brigade was disbanded in July 1940 and he was appointed commander of the 9th Indian Infantry Brigade.

== Second World War ==
From September 1940, the 9th Indian Brigade fought in the East African Campaign as part of 5th Indian Infantry Division where in battles at Agordat and Keren they saw fighting said by commentators to be as fierce as any seen during the war.

Mayne was promoted to General Officer Commanding (GOC) of the 5th Indian Division in April 1941. As a newly promoted major general, he succeeded Major General Lewis Heath who had been posted to command III Indian Corps in Malaya. Under Mayne's command the major fighting was concluded by 5th Indian Division and took the Italian Commander-in-Chief's surrender. At the end of June 1941, 5th Indian Division left East Africa. During the Anglo-Soviet invasion of Iran it was in Kirkuk in Iraq but was not involved with the fighting. In September 1941, Mayne's division relieved the British 50th Infantry Division in Cyprus.

In June 1942, Mayne was promoted to command XXI Indian Corps which became part of Persia and Iraq Command's Tenth Army based in Baghdad. In August 1943, XXI Corps was disbanded and Mayne returned to India to become General Officer Commanding-in-Chief (GOC-in-C) Eastern Command, India in October 1943 to December 1944, being promoted full general in April 1944. In January 1945, Mayne was appointed Military Secretary to the India Office and, after 37 years of military service, retired from the army after the war in 1947.

== Honours ==
Between 1944 and 1947 Mayne held the honorary title of ADC General to the King. He was appointed Companion of the Order of the Bath and Commander of the Order of the British Empire in 1941, Knight Commander in 1944, and Knight Grand Cross (GCB) in 1947.

== Personal ==
Mayne was married in 1916 to Phyllis Tweddell who died in 1949. His only son pre-deceased him, killed in action in 1943 in the Italian campaign. He was friends with Indian army officers like Joyanto Nath Chaudhuri and actively promoted them to higher positions. He died on 17 December 1955.

== See also ==
- Iraqforce

== Bibliography ==
- Smart, Nick (2005). Biographical Dictionary of British Generals of the Second World War. Barnesley: Pen & Sword. ISBN 1844150496.

Military offices
Preceded by Lewis Heath	GOC 5th Indian Infantry Division; 1940–1942	Succeeded by Harold Briggs
Preceded by Sir George Giffard	GOC-in-C, Eastern Command, India; 1943–1944	Succeeded by Sir Richard O'Connor
Preceded by George Molesworth	Military Secretary to the India Office; 1945–1947	Succeeded by Sir Geoffry Scoones
