= Antony Brett-James =

British military historian (1920–1984)

Eliot Antony Brett-James (24 April 1920 – 25 March 1984) was a British military historian.

== Early life and career ==
He was the son of Major Norman G. Brett-James (1879–1960), a schoolmaster and authority on Middlesex, and his wife Gladys Mary Constance (nee Reed). He was educated at Mill Hill School, where his father taught and had himself been a pupil. He served in the Second World War as Second Lieutenant in the Royal Signals (1941) and with the 5th Indian Division of the Royal Signals in the North Africa campaign. He commanded the 9th Infantry Indian Brigade Signals in Burma, where he helped defeat the Japanese in the Arakan Campaign 1942–43 and Imphal.

After the war he studied at Sidney Sussex College, Cambridge, where he was awarded a degree in modern languages. He was subsequently appointed modern languages editor at George G. Harrap and Co. and then reader and publicity manager for Chatto & Windus. He worked for Cassell from 1958 until 1961. In 1961 he was appointed as lecturer in military history at Royal Military Academy Sandhurst and from 1970 until 1980 he was Sandhurst's Head of War Studies. Brett-James authored works on military history, principally on the Napoleonic Wars.

== Works ==
- Report My Signals (London: Hennel Locke, 1948).
- Ball of Fire: The 5th Indian Division in the Second World War (Aldershot: Gale & Polden, 1951).
- The Triple Stream: Four Centuries of English, French, and German Literature, 1531–1930 (Bowes & Bowes, 1953).
- General Graham, Lord Lynedoch (London: Macmillan, 1959).
- Arthur Wellesley, Duke of Wellington at War, 1794–1815: A Selection of His Wartime Letters (London: Macmillan, 1961).
- Imphal: A Flower on Lofty Heights, co-authored with Geoffrey Charles Evans (London: Macmillan, 1962).
- The Hundred Days: Napoleon's Last Campaign from Eyewitness Accounts (London: Macmillan, 1964).
- General Wilson's Journal, 1812–1814 (William Kimber, 1964).
- 1812: Eyewitness Accounts of Napoleon's Defeat in Russia (London: Macmillan, 1966).
- Edward Costello: The Peninsular and Waterloo Campaigns (London: Longmans, 1967), editor.
- The British Soldier in the Napoleonic Wars, 1793–1815 (London: Macmillan, 1970).
- Europe Against Napoleon: The Leipzig Campaign, 1813, From Eyewitness Accounts (London: Macmillan, 1970).
- Life in Wellington's Army (London: Allen and Unwin, 1972).
- The Korean War 1950–1953: An Exhibition to Commemorate the Armistice in Korea, 19 July 1953 (Department of War Studies and International Affairs and the Central Library, 1976).
- Conversations with Montgomery (William Kimber, 1984).
