= Arthur Holworthy =

British Indian Army officer (1897–1983)

Arthur Holworthy DSO MC
- Portrait by Walter Stoneman, 1947
- Born: Arthur Wilmot Wadeson Holworthy; 12 December 1897; Shanghai, China
- Died: 1983 (aged 85–86); Ledbury, Herefordshire, England
- Military career
- Allegiance: United Kingdom
- Branch: British Indian Army
- Service years: 1917–1947
- Rank: Major-General
- Nickname: "Hol"
- Service number: 279566
- Unit: 3rd Queen Alexandra's Own Gurkha Rifles
- Commands: 10th Indian Infantry Brigade; 7th Indian Infantry Brigade; 6th Indian Infantry Division; 4th Indian Infantry Division
- Conflicts: World War I; World War II
- Awards: Distinguished Service Order; Military Cross

Major-General Arthur Wilmot Wadeson Holworthy DSO MC (12 December 1897 – 1983) was a senior British Indian Army officer who fought in both World War I and World War II.

== Military career ==
Holworthy was commissioned as a second lieutenant on 16 June 1917 during World War I and appointed to the 1st Battalion 3rd Queen Alexandra's Own Gurkha Rifles on 29 June 1917. He was promoted to lieutenant on 18 June 1918 he was awarded the Military Cross for gallantry in Kurdistan in 1919. Promoted to captain on 18 June 1921 he became an instructor at the Army School of Education on 10 June 1929 and then attended the Staff College, Camberley from 1933 to 1934. He became a company commander in the 1st Battalion, 7th Duke of Edinburgh's Own Gurkha Rifles on 17 June 1936 and the Brigade Major for the Jullunder Brigade Area on 15 June 1936, being promoted to the substantive rank of major on 1 July 1939 and Brevet lieutenant-colonel on 1 January 1939.

Holworthy served in World War II as Assistant Commandant of the Junior Commanders School in India from 13 July 1940 to 28 November 1940 before becoming Commander of the Indian 10th Infantry Brigade in 1942 and Commander of the 7th Infantry Brigade in North Africa later that year. Promoted to the substantive rank of lieutenant-colonel on 18 June 1943 and acting major-general on 15 June 1943, he became General Officer Commanding Indian 6th Infantry Division in Persia in 1943.

Holworthy was promoted to war substantive colonel and temporary major-general on 15 June 1944 and became General Officer Commanding Indian 4th Infantry Division in Italy that year. He retired as a colonel and was granted the honorary rank of major general on 15 April 1947.

== See also ==
- British Indian Army

== Bibliography ==
- Smart, Nick (2005). Biographical Dictionary of British Generals of the Second World War. Barnesley: Pen & Sword. ISBN 1844150496.
- MacKenzie, Compton (1951). Eastern Epic. Chatto & Windus, London. pp. 623 pages.
- "Orders of Battle.com". Archived from the original on 30 September 2007.

Military offices
Preceded by James Thomson	GOC 6th Indian Infantry Division; 1943–1944	Succeeded by Brian Chappel
Preceded by Alexander Galloway	GOC 4th Indian Infantry Division; 1944–1945	Succeeded by Charles Boucher
