= 89th Indian Infantry Brigade =

- Active: 1942–1945
- Country: British India
- Allegiance: British Crown
- Branch: British Indian Army
- Size: Brigade
- Engagements: Burma Campaign

Commanders
- Notable commanders: Brigadier JC Martin; Brigadier WA Crowther; Lieutenant Colonel HRR Conder; Brigadier ICA Lauder DSO, OBE, PJK

The 89th Indian Infantry Brigade was an Infantry formation of the Indian Army during World War II. It was formed in October 1942, at Bhiar Kund in India. The brigade was assigned to the 7th Indian Infantry Division and fought in the Burma Campaign. Apart from between May and June 1944, when it was attached to the 5th Indian Infantry Division, the brigade remained with the 7th Division until the end of the war.

== Formation ==
- 4th Battalion, 8th Gurkha Rifles October 1942 to August 1945
- 7th Battalion, 15th Punjab Regiment October 1942 to September 1943
- 2nd Battalion, King's Own Scottish Borderers January 1943 to June 1945
- 7th Battalion, 2nd Punjab Regiment September 1943 to March 1944
- 4th Battalion, 1st Gurkha Rifles January and February 1944
- 3rd Battalion, 6th Gurkha Rifles June to August 1945
- 1st Battalion, 11th Sikh Regiment April 1944 to August 1945
- 7th Battalion, York and Lancaster Regiment June to July 1945
- 4th Battalion, Queen's Own Royal West Kent Regiment July to August 1945

== See also ==
- List of Indian Army Brigades in World War II
