= Harold Rawdon Briggs =

British Army general (1894–1952)

Lieutenant-General Sir Harold Rawdon Briggs KCIE KBE CB DSO**
- Born: 24 July 1894; Pipestone, Minnesota, United States
- Died: 27 October 1952 (aged 58); Limassol, Cyprus
- Military career
- Allegiance: United Kingdom
- Branch: British Army; British Indian Army
- Service years: 1915–1948; 1950–1951
- Rank: Lieutenant-General
- Nickname: "Briggo"
- Units: King's Regiment (Liverpool); 16th Punjab Regiment
- Commands: Burma Command (1946–1948); 5th Indian Infantry Division (1942–1944); 7th Indian Infantry Brigade (1940–1942); 2nd Battalion, 10th Baluch Regiment (1937–1940)
- Conflicts: First World War; North-West Frontier; Second World War; Malayan Emergency
- Awards: Knight Commander of the Order of the Indian Empire; Knight Commander of the Order of the British Empire; Companion of the Order of the Bath; Distinguished Service Order & Two Bars; Mentioned in Despatches (3)

Lieutenant-General Sir Harold Rawdon Briggs, KCIE, KBE, CB, DSO & Two Bars (24 July 1894 – 27 October 1952) was a senior British Indian Army officer, active during the First World War, Second World War and the Malayan Emergency.

Briggs was highly regarded by his superiors, among them being Field Marshal Sir William Slim, who is perhaps most famous as being the commander of the British Fourteenth Army during the Burma campaign. Of Briggs, who commanded the 5th Indian Infantry Division during the campaign, Slim wrote: "I know of few commanders who made as many immediate and critical decisions on every step of the ladder of promotion, and I know of none who made so few mistakes".

== Early life and military career ==
Born in Pipestone, Minnesota, to English parents who returned to England a few years after his birth, Briggs was an American citizen until receiving British naturalisation papers in 1914. Educated at Bedford School, he then became a cadet at the Royal Military College, Sandhurst. In 1915, several months after the British entry into the First World War, and after an initial appointment to the British Indian Army was cancelled, he was commissioned into the King's Regiment (Liverpool) of the British Army and fought with the regiment in France.

In 1916, Briggs transferred to the Indian Army, joining the 31st Punjabis (which in 1922 became the 2nd Battalion, 16th Punjab Regiment), fighting in Mesopotamia and later in Palestine. In September 1917 he was appointed to command one of the 31st Punjabi's companies in the rank of acting captain, and was attached to the 152nd Punjabis in May 1918 in the same role.

In 1924, Briggs transferred to the 1st Battalion, 10th Baluch Regiment with which he saw two periods of action in the North-West Frontier of India in the 1930s. After attending the Staff College, Quetta from 1927 to 1928, Briggs was promoted to major in August 1932 (having been made a brevet-major in January) and then lieutenant colonel in September 1937 when given command of the 2nd Battalion, 10th Baluch Regiment (now the 7th Battalion, Baloch Regiment).

== Second World War ==
At the start of the Second World War, Briggs was in India commanding the 2nd Battalion, 10th Baluch Regiment. In September 1940 he was promoted to brigadier and given command of 7th Indian Infantry Brigade.

=== Western Desert ===
The brigade was shipped to join Indian 4th Infantry Division, which was forming in Egypt to face the Italian threat from Libya. The brigade was not involved in the fighting during Operation Compass but in December 1940 was detached from the division and sent to Port Sudan near the border with northern Eritrea while the rest of the division (plus one battalion of 7th Brigade) was sent to join Indian 5th Infantry Division on Eritrea's western border with Sudan.

=== East Africa ===
During the East African Campaign, Briggs commanded Briggsforce – a brigade group composed of two battalions from the 7th Indian Infantry Brigade, one Senegalese battalion officered by Free French officers and a French Foreign Legion battalion from Chad together with a battery of field artillery and a company of engineers. Operating independently from the main force, Briggsforce advanced from Sudan and, under the direct orders of Lieutenant General William Platt, entered Eritrea from the north through the border town of Karura. The force then continued southwards and fought its way to the defences of Keren.

During the Battle of Keren in March 1941, Briggsforce drew off a significant part of the Italian garrison of Keren even though it lacked the artillery for a major offensive action itself. The attacks by Briggsforce aided Platt's main offensive from the west. Briggs also posed a threat to Massawa, Eritrea's main port, on the coast to the east. This obliged the Italians to maintain reserves on the coast which could have been better employed at Keren.

Following Keren's capture, Briggsforce cut across country to play a significant role in the capture of Massawa on 9 April. For his actions in East Africa, Briggs was awarded his first Distinguished Service Order (DSO) on 30 December 1941.

=== Return to the Western Desert ===
By the end of April the 7th Indian Brigade had rejoined 4th Indian Division and returned to Egypt. Owing to lack of transport the brigade took no part in Operation Battleaxe in June but in August was detached once again as the Oasis Group to hold the Siwa and Jarabub Oases, some 150 miles (240 km) south of the Mediterranean coast on each side of the Egypt – Libya border.

Handing over the Oases responsibilities to Indian 29th Infantry Brigade, the 7th Brigade next took part in Operation Crusader in November 1941 when Briggs was given the task of taking the Omars, three fortress strongholds some 20 miles (32 km) from the coast and forming part of the Axis defenses on the Libyan border. Omar Nuovo was taken on 21 November, the first day of fighting, but it took a week to clear Libyan Omar completely. The third fortress held firm. When the Afrika Korps, under Erwin Rommel ("The Desert Fox"), heavily defeated the British armour at Sidi Rezegh he made his "dash for the wire" to destroy Eighth Army's rear echelons. On 25 November the Axis armour reached 7th Infantry Brigade dug into its newly captured positions and was severely mauled by the divisional artillery and forced to withdraw to the main Axis positions around Tobruk.

Briggs's brigade took part in Eighth Army's advance to and through the Axis defensive line at Gazala, ending the year at Benghazi. When Rommel counterattacked in late January from his position at El Agheila Briggs found his brigade, still at Benghazi, threatened with being cut off. Dispersing into battalion groups the brigade made its way south across the Axis rear lines into the desert and then turned eastwards to reach Mechili, still in British hands, with almost no losses. For his leadership during this period Briggs was awarded a second DSO.

As the front line stabilised at the Gazala line 7th Indian Brigade was sent to Cyprus as one of the units relieving Indian 5th Infantry Division which had organised its defenses. However, in May 1942 Briggs was promoted to command Indian 5th Infantry Division which had been placed in reserve behind the Eighth Army's Gazala position. At this time Briggs still only had the substantive rank of lieutenant-colonel, although he was promoted to full colonel in September 1942 with seniority backdated to September 1940.

During the Battle of Gazala in June Briggs narrowly avoided capture when his tactical HQ was overrun. His division took heavy casualties in the unsuccessful Operation Aberdeen and was forced to withdraw from Knightsbridge and El Adem to Sollum on the Egypt – Libyan border to reform. The division was at Mersa Matruh involved in the delaying action as Eighth Army withdrew to El Alamein and again was severely mauled. The division's 29th Infantry Brigade was overrun and destroyed at Fuka, east of Mersa Matruh, but the two remaining depleted brigades were able to make it back to Alamein.

At Alamein the division was reinforced with the 161st Indian Infantry Brigade and took part in various engagements in July around the Ruweisat Ridge, part of the First Battle of El Alamein.

During the Battle of Alam el Halfa in late August and early September the division was engaged on the Ruweisat Ridge but saw only relatively light action as the main Axis attack developed to the south. Briggs was mentioned in despatches for activities in the Middle East during the period May to October 1942.

=== Persia ===
In the autumn of 1942 5th Indian Division was sent to Persia to form part of XXI Corps within the Tenth Army. The Tenth Army was in place to defend against the threat of a German breakthrough in the Caucasus. The Soviet victory at the Battle of Stalingrad, however, made this only a very remote possibility and so Briggs, together with his division, was sent in June 1943 to India to join Indian XV Corps then commanded by William Slim, who was shortly to be promoted to command the Fourteenth Army. Briggs was mentioned in despatches in August 1943 for his service in Persia-Iraq.

=== Burma campaign ===
In early 1944 Briggs was with Indian 5th Infantry Division in the Arakan in Burma. XV Corps' offensive in January was held by the Japanese who went on the offensive in February, attempting to cut off 5th and 7th Indian Infantry Divisions. Briggs' 9 Indian Brigade, cut off but supplied by air, held off the Japanese during the Battle of the Admin Box and the two divisions were able to turn the tables on the Japanese and with the help of Indian 26th Infantry Division and British 36th Infantry Division to the north, inflict a heavy defeat on the Japanese.

In March 1944 the bulk of Briggs' division was airlifted north to Imphal while 161st Indian Brigade was sent to Kohima to become heavily involved in the Battle of Kohima. At Imphal the division was heavily involved in fighting from the end of March until late June when it made contact with British 2nd Infantry Division advancing from Kohima. Following this Briggs was rested and posted to administrative jobs in India, having been awarded a second bar to his DSO in May 1944. He was mentioned in despatches in April 1945 and appointed as a Commander of the Order of the British Empire in May 1945 for services in Burma.

Having commanded a division since May 1942 as an acting major general, Briggs was only promoted substantive major general in July 1945, after he had relinquished command. Unusually, he never held the substantive rank of brigadier, being promoted from colonel directly to major general.

== Post War and retirement ==
He was appointed lieutenant-general in 1946 when he became Commander in Chief, Burma Command. He was made a Companion of the Order of the Bath in June 1946. He retired in January 1948 to live in Cyprus having been made Knight Commander of the Order of the Indian Empire in August 1948. Although only a substantive major general on retirement, he was given the honorary rank of lieutenant general in July 1948.

== Malaya ==
In 1950, Briggs was recalled to active duty by Slim, who was by that time Chief of the Imperial General Staff (CIGS), to become Director of Operations in Malaya where the Malayan Emergency was in progress. The implementation of the Briggs Plan is considered an important factor in the authorities' victory over the Malayan Communist Party rebels. The Briggs Plan called for the creation of a type of internment camps known as a New village and for many of these villages to hold populations of largely ethnic Malaysian Chinese villagers against their will. This was done with the intention of cutting off contact between the civilian population and the communist guerrillas who lived in rural areas of Malaya. He was advanced to Knight Commander of the British Empire in the 1952 New Year Honours.

In 1951, Briggs once again retired to Cyprus but, his health destroyed by his period in Malaya, he died in 1952. The role of Director of Operations in Malaya was assumed by Sir Gerald Templer who oversaw the successful implementation of Briggs' plan.

== Summary of military career ==
- Commissioned into Kings (Liverpool) Regiment, France – 1915
- Transferred to 31st Punjabis, Mesopotamia – 1916
- Transferred to 1st Battalion, 10th Baluch Regiment – 1923
- Commanding Officer 2nd Battalion, 10th Baluch Regiment – 1937 to 1940
- Commander 7th (Poona) Brigade, 4th Indian Infantry Division, North Africa, East Africa – 1940 to 1942
- GOC 5th Indian Infantry Division, North Africa, Iraq, Burma – 1942 to 1944
- GOC-in-C Burma Command – 1946 to 1948
- Director of Operations, Malaya – 1950 to 1951

== See also ==
- Iraqforce

== Bibliography ==
- Brett-James, Antony (1951). Ball of fire – The Fifth Indian Division in the Second World War. Aldershot, UK: Gale & Polden. Archived from the original on 27 March 2020.
- Hamby, Major Joel E. (2002). "Civil-military operations: joint doctrine and the Malayan Emergency". Joint Force Quarterly (Autumn 2002). National Defense University Press. Archived from the original on 19 February 2007.
- Mead, Richard (2007). Churchill's Lions: A Biographical Guide to the Key British Generals of World War II. Stroud (UK): Spellmount. p. 544 pages. ISBN 978-1-86227-431-0.
- Slim, Field Marshal Viscount (1972) [1956]. Defeat into Victory. London: Cassell. ISBN 0-304-29114-5.
- Smart, Nick (2005). Biographical Dictionary of British Generals of the Second World War. Barnsley, U.K.: Pen & Sword Military. ISBN 1-84415-049-6.

Military offices
Preceded by Mosley Mayne	GOC 5th Indian Infantry Division; 1942–1944	Succeeded by Geoffrey Evans
