= 29th Indian Infantry Brigade =

Infantry brigade of the Indian Army during World War II

- Active: 1941–1945
- Country: (British Raj) British India
- Allegiance: British Empire
- Branch: British Indian Army
- Type: Infantry
- Size: Brigade
- Engagements: East African campaign Western Desert campaign

Commanders
- Notable commanders: John Charles Oakes Marriott

The 29th Indian Infantry Brigade was an infantry brigade formation of the Indian Army during World War II. It was formed on 11 October 1940, by the renumbering of the British 21st Infantry Brigade. It was assigned to the 5th Indian Infantry Division. They took part in the East African campaign and the Western Desert campaign and was destroyed on 28 June 1942 during the fighting at Fuka during the First Battle of El Alamein.

== Composition ==
- 1st Battalion, Worcestershire Regiment – October 1940 to June 1942
- 1st Battalion, Essex Regiment – October 1940
- 3rd Battalion, 2nd Punjab Regiment – October 1940 to March 1941 and May 1941 to June 1942
- 6th Battalion, 13th Frontier Force Rifles – October 1940 to May 1942
- 1st Battalion, 2nd Punjab Regiment – January 1942
- 1st Battalion, 5th Mahratta Light Infantry – May to June 1942
- 2nd Battalion, Highland Light Infantry – June 1942
- 2nd Field Company, Indian Engineers – August to November 1941

== See also ==
- List of Indian Army Brigades in World War II
