= 10th Indian Infantry Brigade =

Infantry Brigade of the Indian Army during World War II

- Active: 1939–1945
- Country: (British Raj) British India
- Allegiance: British Empire
- Branch: British Indian Army
- Type: Infantry
- Size: Brigade
- Engagements: East African Campaign; North African Campaign; Italian Campaign

The 10th Indian Infantry Brigade was an infantry brigade formation of the Indian Army during World War II. It was formed in September 1939. In June 1940 it was assigned to the 5th Indian Infantry Division and in September 1940, sailed for East Africa. The brigade spent time attached to other formations, the 4th Indian Infantry Division between June 1940 and March 1941, and the British 10th Armoured Division between March and June 1942, where it was destroyed during the Battle of Gazala. A new brigade was formed in Egypt and assigned to the 10th Indian Infantry Division, with which it fought in the Italian Campaign from April 1944 until the end of the war.

== Formation ==
- 3rd Cavalry September to October 1939
- 1st Battalion, 7th Rajput Regiment September 1939 to May 1940
- 1st Battalion, 2nd Punjab Regiment September to October 1939 and January to October 1944
- 2nd Battalion, King's Own Scottish Borderers September 1939 to October 1939
- 3rd Battalion, 14th Punjab Regiment October 1939 to October 1940
- 3rd Battalion, 18th Royal Garhwal Rifles October 1939 to January 1942 and July 1942 to May 1943
- 4th Battalion, 10th Baluch Regiment November 1939 to August 1945
- 3rd Battalion, 2nd Punjab Regiment January to October 1940 and March to May 1941
- 2nd Battalion, Highland Light Infantry October 1940 to June 1942
- 1st Battalion, Essex Regiment October to December 1940
- 28th Field Regiment, Royal Artillery March 1942 to May 1943
- 2nd Battalion, 4th Gurkha Rifles May 1942 to August 1945
- 1st Battalion, Duke of Cornwall's Light Infantry July to August 1942
- 2nd Battalion, 3rd Gurkha Rifles August 1942 to January 1943
- 4th Battalion, 13th Frontier Force Rifles June to December 1943
- 1st Battalion, Durham Light Infantry May 1944 to August 1945
- 4th Battalion, 11th Sikh Regiment August 1944 and December 1944 to January 1945
- 2nd Battalion, 6th Gurkha Rifles November to December 1944
- 3rd Battalion, 1st Punjab Regiment December 1944
- Jodhpur Sardar Infantry December 1944 to March 1945

== Officers commanding ==
The following officers commanded the brigade during the war

Brigadier H.R.C. Lane (early to mid September 1939)
Brigadier W.J. Slim (late September 1939 to January 1941)
Lieutenant-Colonel B.C. Fletcher (January 1941 to March 1941)
Brigadier T.W. Rees (March 1941 to March 1942)
Brigadier C.H. Boucher (March 1942 to June 1942)
Brigadier A.W.W. Holworthy (July 1942 to October 1942)
Brigadier J.A. Finlay (October 1942 to February 1944)
Brigadier T.N. Smith (February 1944 to end of war)

== See also ==
- List of Indian Army Brigades in World War II
