= Rupa, Arunachal Pradesh =

Rupa is a small town in the West Kameng district in the Indian state of Arunachal Pradesh.

According to Census 2011 information, the location code or village code of Rupa village is 261802. Rupa village is located in Rupa Tehsil of West Kameng district in Arunachal Pradesh, India. Rupa is also one of a site of Dolomite production in Arunachal Pradesh.

Rupa circle is inhabitat by a tribal group called Shertukpen. It was called Tukpen before it was called Rupa. The small town has a sporting club called *LOBLANG SC*, which is pretty known in the district for football.
