= Charles Hamilton Boucher =

British Indian army officer during World War 1 & 2

Major-General Sir Charles Hamilton Boucher KBE CB DSO*
- Boucher in 1943
- Born: 26 October 1898; Mooltan, India
- Died: 14 November 1951 (aged 53); London, England
- Military career
- Allegiance: United Kingdom
- Branch: British Indian Army
- Rank: Major-General
- Service number: 106 IA
- Commands: 10th Indian Infantry Brigade (1942); 17th Indian Infantry Brigade (1944–45); Indian 4th Infantry Division (1945); Indian 2nd Airborne Division (1946–47); Malaya Command (1948–50)
- Conflicts: First World War; North-West Frontier; First Waziristan Campaign; Second Mohmand Campaign; Second World War; Anglo-Soviet invasion of Iran; Western Desert campaign; Battle of Gazala; Italian campaign; Battle of Monte Cassino
- Awards: Knight Commander of the Order of the British Empire; Companion of the Order of the Bath; Distinguished Service Order & Bar; Mentioned in Despatches (5)
- Other work: Colonel of the 3rd Queen Alexandra's Own Gurkha Rifles (1946)

Major-General Sir Charles Hamilton Boucher, KBE, CB, DSO* (26 October 1898 – 14 November 1951) was a British Indian Army officer during the First and Second World Wars.

== Early life and career ==
Boucher was born on 26 October 1898, the son of Lieutenant Colonel C. H. Boucher. He was educated at Wellington College from 1912 to 1915, after which he attended Wellington Cadet College in India.

Boucher was commissioned into the Unattached List for the Indian Army on 14 November 1916 and was appointed to the Indian Army on 1 December, attached to 2nd King Edward VII's Own Gurkha Rifles (The Sirmoor Rifles) although he was later to transfer to the 3rd Queen Alexandra's Own Gurkha Rifles in 1919. He was promoted to lieutenant on 14 November 1917 and saw service against the Marris in India from 1 March to 8 April 1918, then saw service in Palestine in October 1918.

After the war he returned to India and saw action on the North West Frontier in Waziristan during the period 1919–21 and 1921–24. He was Mentioned in Despatches. He was promoted captain on 14 November 1920.

Boucher attended the Staff College, Camberley from 1931 to 1932. In April 1933 he was appointed a General Staff Officer Grade III. In November 1934 he relinquished the staff post and was promoted to major to take up a field appointment as a brigade major. In 1936 for "distinguished services rendered in the field in connection with the Mohmand Operations, North West Frontier of India, during the period 15th/16th August to 15th/16th October 1935" he was awarded the Distinguished Service Order (DSO). He was appointed an instructor at the Staff College, Quetta from 21 January 1938 to 21 September 1940 with the local rank of lieutenant colonel.

== Second World War ==
Boucher served throughout the Second World War, initially as a General Staff Officer Grade 1, Home Forces from 26 October 1940 to 18 May 1941 before being made a brigadier on the General Staff of Paiforce in Iraq from 19 May 1941 to 29 March 1942.

In April 1942 he was appointed to command the 10th Indian Infantry Brigade in North Africa. While commanding the brigade he was captured on 6 June 1942 during the fighting in the Knightsbridge Cauldron when his headquarters were overrun. He was held as a prisoner of war in Italy until the Armistice with Italy in September 1943, when he made his way back to the Allied lines in southern Italy. During his confinement his substantive rank was advanced from major to lieutenant colonel (while his temporary rank remained as brigadier) and he was also made a Commander of the Order of the British Empire (CBE) in 1943 "in recognition of gallant and distinguished services in Iraq, Syria and Persia during the period April 1941 to February 1942".

On 8 February 1944 Boucher assumed command of the 17th Indian Infantry Brigade, leading the unit through the final Battle of Monte Cassino, the advance north of Rome and the fighting on the Gothic Line. For his service in Italy he was awarded a Bar to his DSO and made a Companion of the Order of the Bath in 1945. He was also mentioned in despatches.

On 19 January 1945, with the rank of acting major general, Boucher took command of the Indian 4th Infantry Division, which had been sent to Greece in November 1944 to help stabilise the country after the Axis withdrawal. For his "gallant and distinguished services in the field" he was mentioned in despatches in 1946.

Leaving Greece after a year he trained as a parachutist in Britain in order to take command of Indian 2nd Airborne Division in Karachi early in 1946. His temporary major general's rank was made permanent in 1947, and in 1948 he became General Officer Commanding Malaya District as well as Major General Commanding the Brigade of Gurkhas in Malaya. For his service in Malaya he was knighted as a Knight Commander of the Order of the British Empire in 1949, and was mentioned in despatches. He retired in March 1951 through ill health and died on 14 November that year.

== Family ==
He married Edith Margaret, daughter of M. F. Ramsay, J.P. of Lee Priory, Littlebourne, Kent in 1926. He had one son and one daughter.

== Footnotes ==
Military offices
Preceded by Ashton Wade	GOC Malaya District; 1948–1950	Succeeded by Roy Urquhart
