= 11th Indian Infantry Brigade =

Infantry formation of the Indian Army during World War II

11th Infantry Brigade (Indian Army)
- Active: 1939–1945; 1962–
- Country: British India; India
- Allegiance: British Empire; India
- Branch: British Indian Army; Indian Army
- Type: Infantry
- Size: Brigade
- Engagements: World War II: North African campaign; East African campaign; Tunisian campaign; Italian campaign; Greek Civil War

The 11th Indian Infantry Brigade was an infantry brigade formation of the Indian Army during World War II. It was relocated from India to Egypt in the middle of August 1939 and trained at Fayed in Ismailia Governorate on the Great Bitter Lake. In October 1939, it was assigned to the 4th Indian Infantry Division. In May 1942, it was attached to the 5th Indian Infantry Division and in June the 2nd South African Infantry Division when it surrendered after Tobruk was captured by the Germans and Italians in 1942. The brigade was then reformed in Egypt in October 1943 and once more assigned to the 4th Indian Division serving in Tunisia, Italy and, at the end of the war, in Greece.

The brigade was in the North-East Frontier Agency before the Sino-Indian War of 1962 and fought in that war.

== Commanders during World War II ==
- Brigadier Alan B. Macpherson (Aug 1939 - Mar 1940)
- Brigadier Reginald Savory (Mar 1940 - Sep 1941)
- Brigadier Andrew Anderson (Sep 1940 - Jun 1942)
- Brigadier Victor C. Griffin (Jan 1944 - May 1944)
- Brigadier Henry C. Partridge (May 1944 - Oct 1944)
- Brigadier John Hunt (Oct 1944 - Aug 1945)

== Formation ==
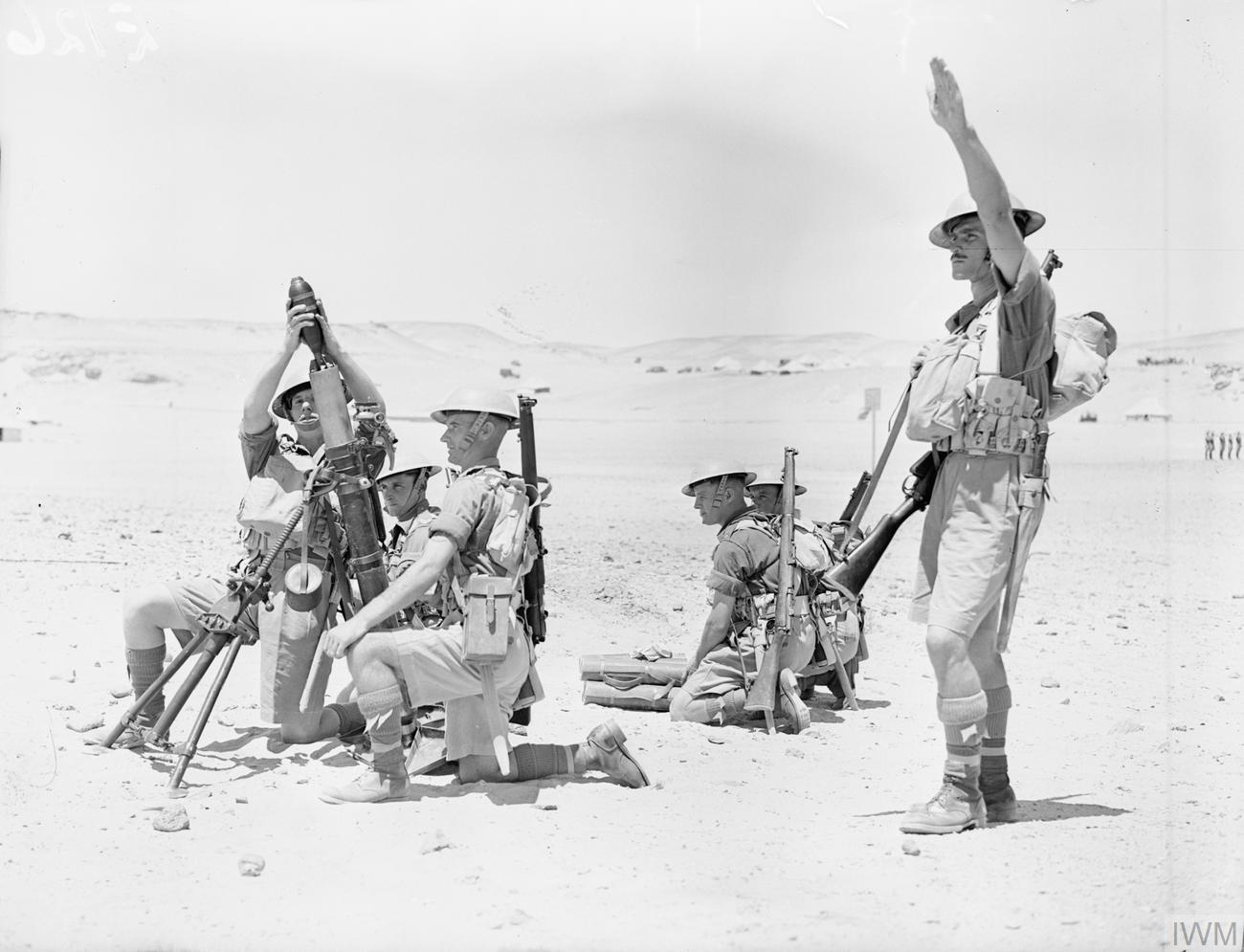
A 3-inch mortar crew of the 2nd Battalion, Queen's Own Cameron Highlanders training at Mena Camp near Giza, Egypt, 4 June 1940.

- 4th Field Regiment, Royal Artillery (August to October 1939)
- 1st Battalion, 6th Rajputana Rifles (August 1939 to December 1941 and February to April 1942 and January to February 1944 and April to May 1944)
- 2nd Battalion, Queen's Own Cameron Highlanders (August 1939 to June 1942 and March 1944 to July 1945)
- 4th Battalion, 7th Rajput Regiment (August 1939 to December 1940)
- 3rd Battalion, 14th Punjab Regiment (January to March 1941)
- 3rd Battalion, 1st Punjab Regiment (February 1941)
- 2nd Battalion, 5th Mahratta Light Infantry (February 1941 to June 1942)
- 2nd Battalion, 7th Gurkha Rifles (May to June 1942 and February to August 1944 and September 1944 to August 1945)
- 25th Field Regiment, Royal Artillery (June 1942)
- 4th Battalion, 6th Rajputana Rifles (November 1943 to February 1944)
- 3rd Battalion, 12th Frontier Force Regiment (March 1944 to August 1945)
- 18th Field Company, Indian Engineers (September to October 1939)

== See also ==
- List of Indian Army Brigades in World War II
