= 7th Indian Infantry Brigade =

- Active: 1939–1945
- Country: (British Raj) British India
- Allegiance: British Empire
- Branch: British Indian Army
- Type: Infantry
- Size: Brigade
- Engagements: World War II; Sino-Indian War of 1962

Commanders
- Notable commanders: Frank Roberts VC

The 7th Indian Infantry Brigade was an infantry brigade of the Indian Army during World War II. During Operation Crusader, they launched a successful assault at the Omars.

The brigade was formed in September 1939, by the redesignation of the Poona Independent Brigade as the 7th Indian Infantry Brigade and renumbered 4th in June 1940, A second 7th Brigade was formed in June 1940, and assigned to the 5th Indian Infantry Division. In September 1940, it was reassigned to the 4th Indian Infantry Division. The brigade formed the garrison at Mersa Matruh in early December 1940. In January 1941, with the rest of the 4th Indian Division were sent to fight in the Sudan campaign.

The brigade moved between the 4th and 5th Indian Divisions command in April 1941, before moving to Cyprus at the end of the month. Returning to the Western Desert (and the 4th Indian Division), it took part in the Second Battle of El Alamein. After reaching Tunisia the brigade come under command of the British 50th Infantry Division in March 1943. Returning to the 4th Division the brigade took part in the Italian Campaign and ended the war in Greece where the division had been sent to keep the factions apart in the Greek Civil War.

The brigade was destroyed in the Sino-Indian War of 1962. Its commander, Brigadier John Dalvi, was the highest-ranking officer to be captured by the PLA. Before the Sino-Indian War the 7th Brigade was deemed to be one of the best brigades in the Indian Army. The unit was disbanded after the war.

== Commanders during World War II ==
- Brigadier Sydney A. H. Hungerford (Sep 1939 – Sep 1940)
- Brigadier Harold Rawdon Briggs (Sep 1940 – May 1942)
- Brigadier John A. Finlay (May 1942 – Oct 1942)
- Brigadier Arthur Holworthy (Oct 1942 – Jan 1943)
- Brigadier Osmond de T. Lovett (Jan 1943 – Apr 1943) (wounded)
- Lieutenant-Colonel Charles E. A. Firth (Apr 1943 – Jun 1943)
- Brigadier Osmond de T. Lovett (Jun 1943 – )

== Commanders during Sino-Indian War 1962 ==
- Brigadier John Dalvi (Jan 1962 – Nov 1962)

== Formation ==
- 1st Battalion, Royal Sussex Regiment
- 2nd (Royal) Battalion, 11th Sikh Regiment
- 4th Battalion, 11th Sikh Regiment (up to April 1942)
- 4th Battalion, 16th Punjab Regiment
- 1st Battalion, 2nd King Edward VII's Own Gurkha Rifles (The Sirmoor Rifles) (from April 1942)

== See also ==
- List of Indian Army Brigades in World War II
