= 9th Indian Infantry Brigade =

Infantry brigade of the Indian Army during World War II

4th Indian Infantry Brigade
- Active: 1939–1945
- Country: (British Raj) British India
- Allegiance: British Empire
- Branch: British Indian Army
- Type: Infantry
- Size: Brigade
- Engagements: Burma Campaign

The 9th Indian Infantry Brigade was an infantry brigade formation of the Indian Army during World War II. Before the war the 9th (Jhansi) Infantry Brigade was a peacetime formation in Meerut district. This brigade was redesignated the 5th Indian Infantry Brigade and a new 9th Brigade was then formed all in September 1939. The new brigade was assigned to the 5th Indian Infantry Division in June 1940 to January 1944. It then spent February attached to the 7th Indian Infantry Division before returning to the 5th Division. The brigade spent two other short periods away from the 5th Division it was attached to the 17th Indian Infantry Division between March and April 1945 and was with the 19th Indian Infantry Division in April 1945, and returned to the 5th for the rest of the war.

== Formation ==
- 1st Battalion, Royal Fusiliers September 1939
- 25th Field Regiment, Royal Artillery September 1939
- 3rd Battalion, 1st Punjab Regiment September 1939
- 4th Battalion, 6th Rajputana Rifles September 1939
- 3rd Battalion, 12th Frontier Force Regiment September 1939 to June 1942
- 3rd Battalion, 5th Mahratta Light Infantry January 1940 to May 1942
- 6th Battalion, 13th Frontier Force Rifles August to October 1940 and December 1940 to January 1941
- 4th Field Regiment, Royal Artillery September to October 1940 and March to June 1944
- 2nd Battalion, West Yorkshire Regiment November 1940 to August 1945
- 3rd Battalion, 18th Royal Garhwal Rifles April to May 1941
- 28th Field Regiment, Royal Artillery October 1941 to March 1942
- 3rd Battalion, 9th Jat Regiment May 1942 to December 1944
- 4th Battalion, 10th Baluch Regiment June 1942
- 3rd Battalion, 14th Punjab Regiment July 1942 to October 1944
- 1st Battalion, 2nd Punjab Regiment July to August 1942
- 4th Battalion, Jammu and Kashmir Infantry October 1944 to April 1945
- 3rd Battalion, 2nd Punjab Regiment March to August 1945
- 1st Battalion, Burma Regiment April to August 1945
- 7th Battalion, York and Lancaster Regiment June 1945

== See also ==
- List of Indian Army Brigades in World War II
