= 4th Infantry Division (India) =

Infantry division of the Indian Army

- Formation sign for the 4th Indian Infantry Division
- Active: 1939–present
- Country: British India (1939–1947); India (1947–present)
- Allegiance: British Empire; India
- Branch: British Indian Army (1939–1947); Indian Army (1947–present)
- Type: Infantry
- Size: Division
- Part of: XIII Corps (historical); I Corps (India)
- Garrison/HQ: Prayagraj
- Nickname: "Red Eagle Division"
- Engagements: Second World War: Capture of Acqua Gap Sino-Indian War Indo-Pakistani War of 1971

Commanders
- Current commander: Major General Bhupendra Singh Fogat
- Notable commanders: Francis Tuker

The 4th Infantry Division, also known as the Red Eagle Division, is an infantry division of the Indian Army. This division of the British Indian Army was formed in Egypt in 1939 during the Second World War. During the Second World War, it took part in campaigns in East Africa (Eritrea and Sudan), Syria, North Africa and Italy. Post independence, the division is part of the I Corps and headquartered at Prayagraj.

== History ==
=== North Africa ===
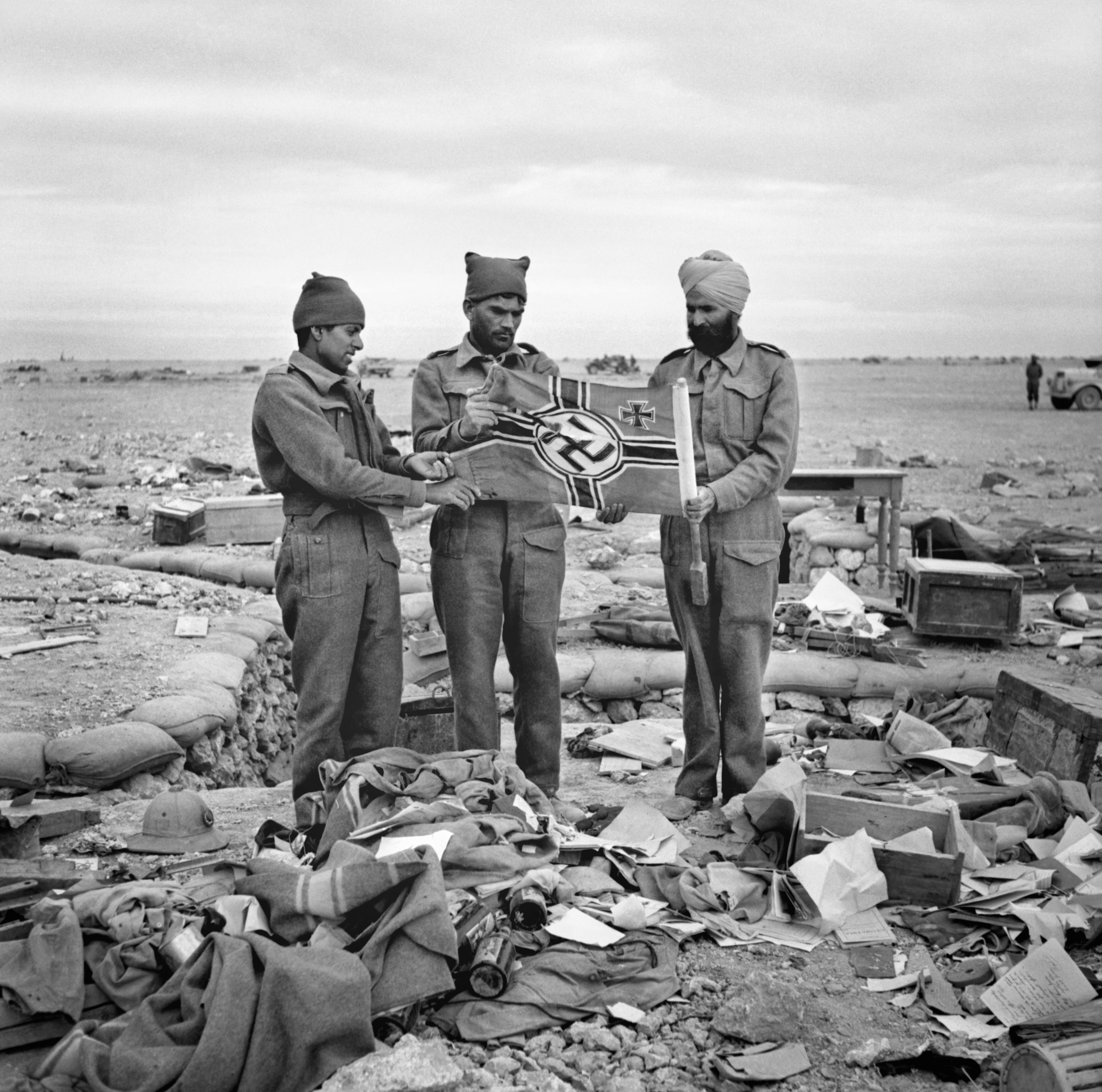
Men of the 4th Indian Division with a captured German flag at Sidi Omar, Egypt.

During the war, the 4th Indian Division was in the vanguard of nine campaigns in the Mediterranean theatre. Major-General The Hon. P. Gerald Scarlett appears to have been the division's first commander, from October 1939 to January 1940. The British 14th Infantry Brigade was attached to the division from 1 June to 20 July 1940; the British 16th Infantry Brigade was attached from 9 September 1940 to 14 December 1940. In the first of Archibald Wavell's operations in Egypt, as part of the Western Desert Force, it took part in Operation Compass in December 1940. The division was involved in the battles of that campaign in the camps around Sidi Barrani. Along with the 7th Royal Tank Regiment, the 11th Indian Infantry Brigade of the 4th Indian Infantry Division destroyed the Italian Maletti Group at the Nibiewa Camp.

=== East Africa ===
East African campaign northern front: Allied advances in 1941

In December 1940, the division was rushed to the British Sudan to join with the 5th Indian Infantry Division in order to prevent the numerically vastly superior Italian forces (ten divisions in total) from threatening Red Sea supply routes to Egypt as well as Egypt itself and the Suez Canal from the south. The East African campaign culminated in March 1941 with the battles at Keren in Eritrea.

It was at Keren that Subadar Richhpal Ram of the 4/6th Rajputana Rifles, 5th Indian Infantry Brigade, 4th Division, was awarded a posthumous Victoria Cross. In April 1941, Beresford-Peirse was promoted to command the Western Desert Force and Major General Frank Messervy assumed command.

=== North Africa and Syria ===
Having returned to Egypt, the 5th Indian Infantry Brigade was hurried across to Syria and participated in the advance on Damascus during the Syria-Lebanon campaign (June 1941). From 14 to 17 June 1941, the British 4th Armoured Brigade was attached to the division. The rest of the 4th Indian Division, having been rejoined by the 5th Brigade returning from Syria, was involved in the fighting, which ebbed and flowed past Tobruk from June 1941 into the autumn of 1941. For most of this period, the division was dispersed, with units temporarily attached to other formations, much to the disgust of Major General Francis Tuker, who had assumed command of the division in December 1941. Notable at this time was the break-out at the end of January by 7th Brigade, having been cut off at Benghazi during the Axis counter-offensive from Agheila and moving 200 miles avoiding the enemy to rejoin the new Eighth Army.

Early in April 1942, the 4th Division was again dispersed, with the 7th Brigade going to Cyprus, the 5th Brigade to Syria, the 11th Brigade to the Suez Canal Zone for training and the Central India Horse to Iraq after a period of training. By May 1942, the 11th Brigade was back in the fighting at Tobruk (attached to the 5th Indian Infantry Division). The 11th Brigade was caught in the siege of Tobruk, which fell on 21 June, and disappeared from the order of battle for the next 18 months. The 5th Brigade was rushed to the desert in June 1942; after escaping from Mersa Matruh, the brigade held the vital Ruweisat Ridge during the First Battle of El Alamein in July–August 1942. The situation had become so confused that General Erwin Rommel, also known as the Desert Fox, lost his way and was forced to spend a night in the open. With the dawn came the realization that he was in the company of 4th Division. With a sigh of relief, he slipped away, undetected.

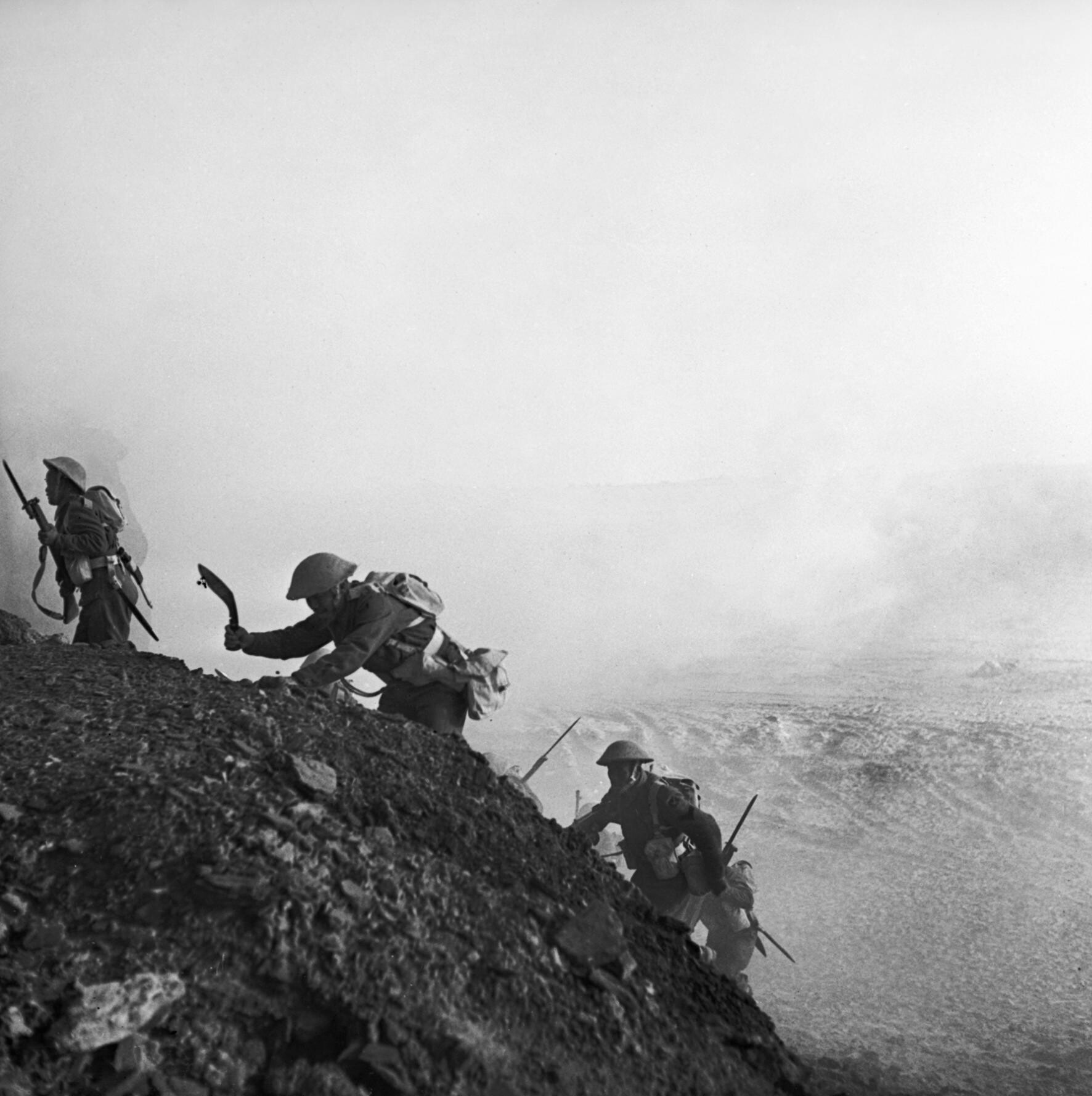
Ghurkhas advance through a smokescreen up a steep slope in Tunisia, 16 March 1943.

Shortly before the Second Battle of El Alamein in October 1942, the 4th Indian Division was reunited with the 7th Brigade returning from Cyprus and the 161st Indian Infantry Brigade was attached (until December 1942) to replace the lost 11th Brigade. The division had a relatively subsidiary role in the battle, holding in stiff fighting, as a diversionary tactic, the Ruweisat Ridge, which was at the centre of the Allied front, whilst the breakthrough was planned further north.

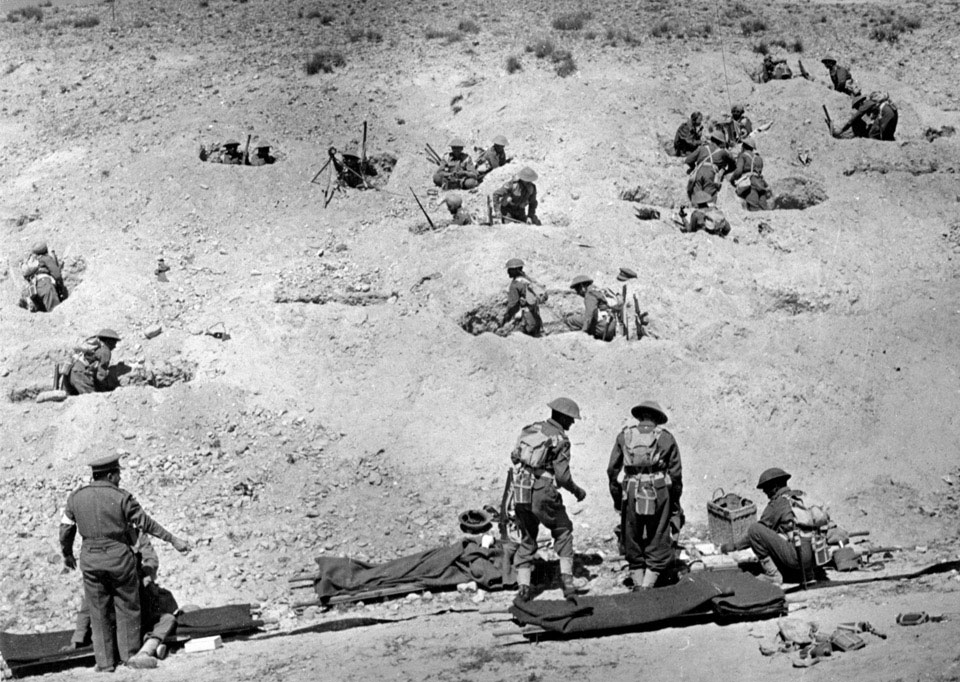
Men of the 4th Indian Division in action in Tunisia, April 1943.

By December 1942, the division was dispersed again but strong representations by its General Officer Commanding (GOC), Major-General Tuker (including his asking to be relieved of command), resulted in the 4th Indian Division being brought together as a fighting entity in March 1943. It fought with distinction in the Tunisia Campaign, right through to the fall of Tunis in May 1943, gaining a particular reputation for its prowess in mountainous country. The division had the honour of capturing General Hans-Jürgen von Arnim in Tunisia, bringing an end to the war in North Africa. Its major battles in North Africa were Benghazi, Tobruk, Wadi Akarit, Enfidaville and Tunis.

=== Italy ===
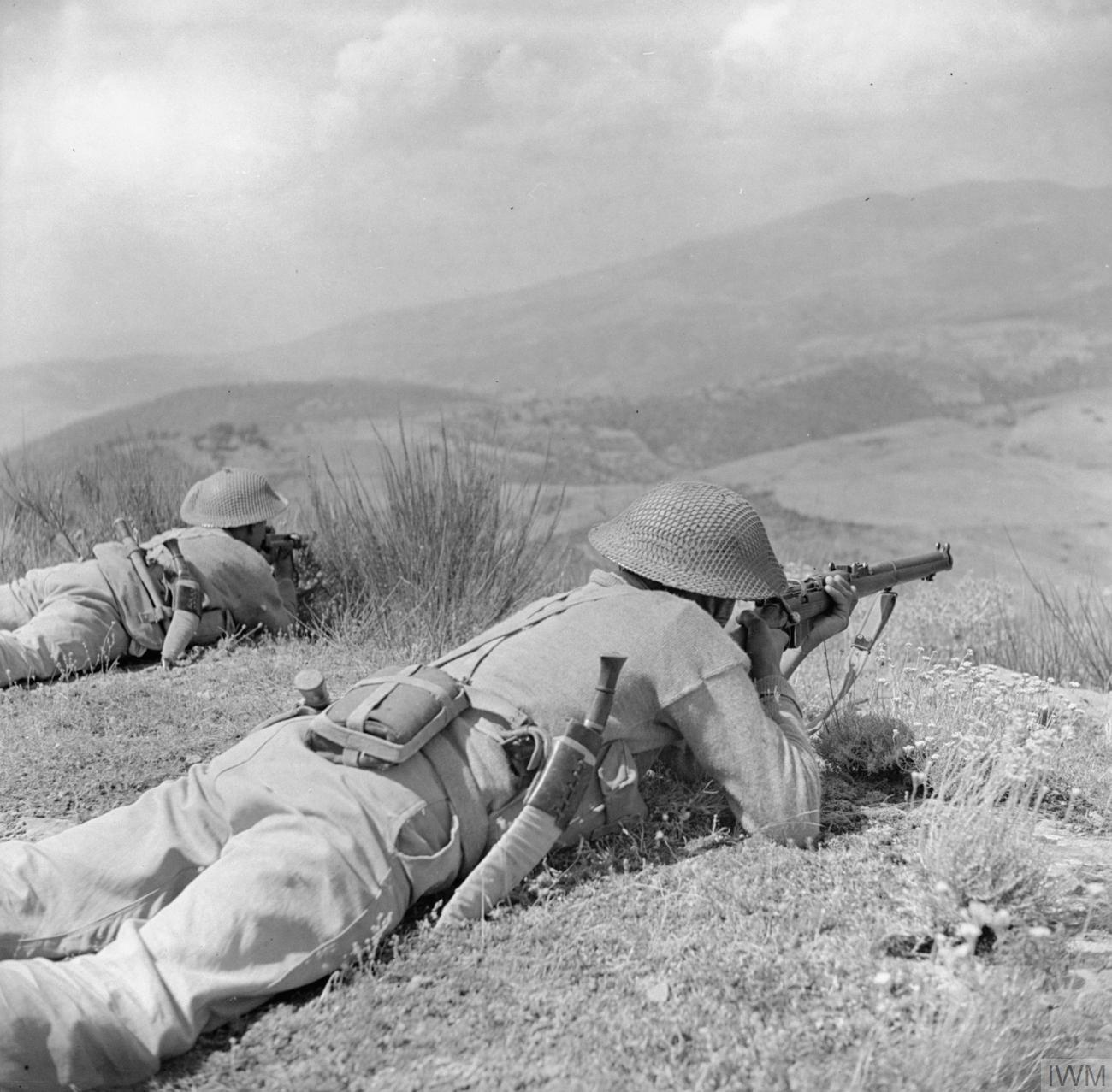
Gurkhas of the 4th Indian Division keep watch on enemy positions in Alpi di Catenaia from high ground on Monte Castiglione, 29 July 1944.

The division then moved in January 1944 to Italy (joined by the re-constituted 11th Brigade), where it took part in the Italian Campaign. It fought in the second Battle of Monte Cassino and suffered many casualties (in Tuker's absence through illness it was commanded by Brigadier Harry Dimoline, the divisional Commander Royal Artillery). During the battle, the division was to attack in an arc towards the south and south-west, taking Point 593 and then moving south-east, up the heights towards the Abbey. The Indian Division would only advance on the Abbey once the 2nd New Zealand Division had attacked south and south-east, taking the town of Cassino. The main attack eventually commenced just after last light with the NZ Division's 28 (Maori) Battalion to cross the Rapido River and to seize the station south of Cassino town, establishing a bridgehead for the corps armour to move into the town and to the foot of the Cassino massif—the attack starting at 2:130. The 28th Battalion attack failed and so did the 4th Indian Division attack on Point 593.

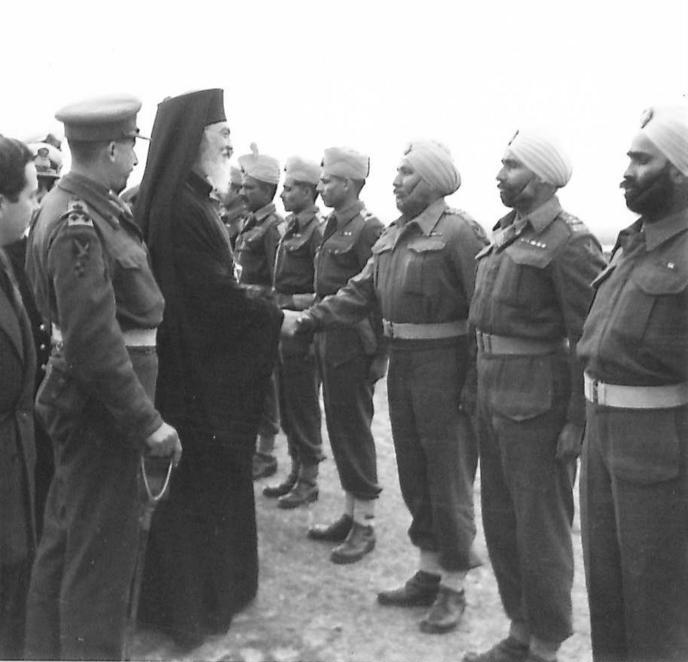
Archbishop Damaskinos inspecting Indian troops of the 4th Indian Division, Salonika, 1 March 1945.

The division also suffered many casualties during the third battle (in March 1944), when it was commanded by Major-General Alexander Galloway, who had been released from command of the British 1st Armoured Division.

Command of the division was assumed by Major-General Arthur Holworthy late in March 1944 and the division took part in the advance from Cassino after the fourth battle in May 1944 to the Trasimene Line in Central Italy and then the Gothic Line. As part of the attachments and detachments for the campaign, the British 9th Armoured Brigade was attached to the division from 8 July 1944 to 19 July 1944. In November 1944, the division was shipped to Greece to help stabilise the country after the Axis withdrawal. Holworthy was succeeded by Major-General Charles Hamilton Boucher in January 1945 who commanded the division until the end of hostilities.

=== Conclusion ===
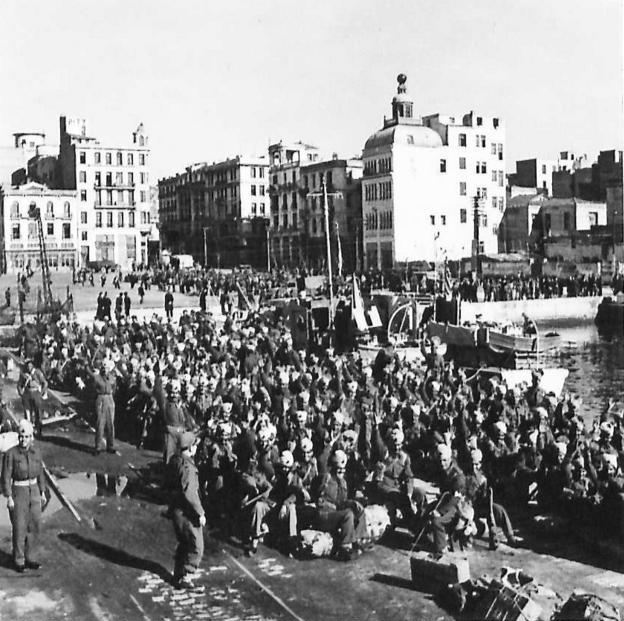
Red Eagles (4th Indian Infantry Division) depart from Thessaloniki, 2 February 1946.

According to author Chand Das, during the Second World War, the "division captured 150,000 prisoners and suffered 25,000 casualties, more than the strength of a whole division. It won over 1,000 honours and awards which included four Victoria Crosses and three George Crosses".

Field Marshal Lord Wavell wrote: "The fame of this Division will surely go down as one of the greatest fighting formations in military history, to be spoken of with such as The Legio X Equestris (Tenth Legion), The Light Division of the Peninsular War and Napoleon's Old Guard". Das wrote, "Even beyond its fighting reputation, it will be remembered for the spirit of mutual trust and fellowship maintained between all ranks coming from so many different races and creeds".

== Formation during World War II ==
The unit listing is from a booklet issued to mark the inauguration of the Indian Divisions' Memorial 1939–1945 at RMA Sandhurst in June 1982.

General Officer Commanding:

- Major-General The Hon. P. Gerald Scarlett (Oct 1939 – Jan 1940)
- Major-General Philip Neame (Feb – Aug 1940)
- Major-General Noel Beresford-Peirse (Aug 1940 – Apr 1941)
- Major-General Frank Messervy (Apr – Dec 1941)
- Major-General Francis Tuker (Dec 1941 – Feb 1944)
- Brigadier Harry Dimoline (Feb – Mar 1944)
- Major-General Alexander Galloway (Mar 1944)
- Major-General Arthur Holworthy (Mar 1944 – Jan 1945)
- Major-General Charles Boucher (Jan – Aug 1945)

=== Headquarters ===
- Central India Horse (up to April 1942 and from July 1944) (Divisional Reconnaissance Regiment)
- Royal Artillery

Commanders divisional artillery:

- Brigadier Noel Beresford-Peirse
- Brigadier P. Maxwell (Jun – Sep 1940)
- Brigadier William H.B. Mirrless (Sep 1940 – Mar 1942)
- Brigadier Harry Kenneth Dimoline (Mar 1942 – Feb 1944)
- Brigadier John F. Adye (Feb 1944 – Mar 1944)
- Brigadier Henry C.W. Eastman (Apr 1944 – )
  - HQ
  - 3rd Regiment Royal Horse Artillery
  - 1st, 4th, 11th, 25th, 31st and 32nd Field Regiments, RA
  - 57th (King's Own Yorkshire Light Infantry) Light A.A. Regiment, RA
  - 35th and 149th Anti-Tank Regiments, RA
- Indian Engineers: Sappers and Miners
  - 4th Field Company, King George's Own Bengal Sappers and Miners
  - 12th Field Company, Queen Victoria's Own Madras Sappers and Miners
  - 18th and 21st Field Company, Royal Bombay Sappers and Miners
  - 11th Field Park Company, Queen Victoria's Own Madras Sappers and Miners
- 4th Indian Division Signals
- 1st Battalion, Royal Northumberland Fusiliers (Machine Gun) (April–December 1940)
- Machine Gun Battalion, 6th Rajputana Rifles (1942–1945)

=== 5 Indian Infantry Brigade ===
- HQ 5th Indian Infantry Brigade
- 1st Battalion, Royal Fusiliers (up to Sept 1941)
- 1st Battalion, Buffs (Royal East Kent Regiment) (from Sept 1941 to Dec 1941))
- 1st Battalion, Welch Regiment (from Dec 1941 up to April 1942)
- 1/4th Battalion, Essex Regiment (from April 1942)
- 1st Battalion, 1st Punjab Regiment (up to April 1942)
- 3rd Battalion, 1st Punjab Regiment
- 4th Battalion (Outram's), 6th Rajputana Rifles (with 11th Indian Infantry Brigade in Italy)
- 3rd Battalion (Queen Mary's Own), 10th Baluch Regiment (from April 1942)
- 1st Battalion, 9th Gurkha Rifles

=== 7 Indian Infantry Brigade ===
- HQ 7th Indian Infantry Brigade
- 1st Battalion, Royal Sussex Regiment
- 2nd (Royal) Battalion, 11th Sikh Regiment
- 4th Battalion, 11th Sikh Regiment (up to April 1942)
- 4th Battalion, 16th Punjab Regiment
- 1st Battalion, 2nd King Edward VII's Own Gurkha Rifles (The Sirmoor Rifles) (from April 1942)

=== 11 Indian Infantry Brigade (1939–1942 and 1944–1945) ===
- HQ 11th Indian Infantry Brigade
- 2nd Battalion, Queen's Own Cameron Highlanders
- 2nd Battalion, 5th Mahratta Light Infantry (up to June 1942)
- 1st Battalion (Wellesley's), 6th Rajputana Rifles (up to April 1942)(with 5th Indian Infantry Brigade in Italy)
- 4th Battalion, 7th Rajput Regiment (up to January 1942)
- 3rd (Royal) Battalion, 12th Frontier Force Regiment
- 3rd Battalion, 14th Punjab Regiment (from January 1942)
- 2nd Battalion, 7th Gurkha Rifles (from April 1942)
- 1st Battalion, Royal Yugoslav Guards (from March 1942)
- Lovat Scouts

=== Support units ===
- Royal Indian Army Service Corps
  - 4th Indian Division Troops Transport Company
  - 5th, 7th and 11th Brigade Transport Companies
  - 220th Indian DID
- Medical Services
  - I.M.S-RAMC-I.M.D-I.H.C-I.A.M.C
  - 14th, 17th, 19th, 26th and 32nd Indian Field Ambulances
  - 4th Indian Division Provost Unit
- Indian Army Ordnance Corps
  - 4th Indian Division Ordnance Field Park
- Indian Electrical and Mechanical Engineers
  - 117th, 118th and 119th Infantry Workshop Companies
  - 4th Indian Division Recovery Company

== Assigned brigades ==
All these brigades were assigned or attached to the division at some time during World War II.

- 4th New Zealand Infantry Brigade
- 10th Indian Infantry Brigade
- 22nd British Infantry Brigade
- 23rd British Infantry Brigade
- 161st British Infantry Brigade
- 1st South African Infantry Brigade
- 161st Indian Infantry Brigade
- 201st Guards Motor Brigade
- 11th Canadian Infantry Brigade

== Post war ==
The division, known as Red Eagle due to its badge of a red eagle on a black background, is now a part of the Indian Army. Immediately after the war ended, it was in Greece, but returned to India later in 1945.

In 1947 the division became the nucleus of the Punjab Boundary Force under Major-General T.W. Rees. The Boundary Force was established on 17 July 1947, with its headquarters at Lahore. It became operational 1 August 1947, but was disbanded on 1 September because of its ineffectiveness in controlling the riots breaking out as a consequence of Partition. It had approximately 15 Indian and 10 Pakistani battalions, and comprised 5th Indian Infantry Brigade, 11th Indian Infantry Brigade, 14 Parachute Brigade, which became part of the Pakistan Army, 43 Lorry Brigade (ex 1 Armoured Division) and 114th Indian Infantry Brigade. Also attached were 50th Parachute Brigade and 77th Parachute Brigade (both formerly with 2nd Airborne Division), and 123rd Indian Infantry Brigade. After Rees handed over, Major-General K. S. Thimayya reportedly took over command of the Boundary Force. The division moved to Jullunder after the Boundary Force was disbanded.

== Sino-Indian War of 1962 ==
Headquarters 4 Infantry Division, which was located in Ambala prior to the worsening Sino-Indian relations, was moved to the North East in 1959 and was located initially at Tezpur. During the war, its tactical headquarters was based at Zemithang and at Dirang Dzong in Kameng Frontier Division of North East Frontier Agency (NEFA). It was commanded by Major General Niranjan Prasad. Following the defeat at Namka Chu, he was replaced by Major General Anant Singh Pathania.

The constituent brigades of the division before the war were 5, 7, and 11 Infantry Brigades. 11 Brigade was detached for counter-insurgency operations in Nagaland.

During the war, the division consisted of -

- 7 Infantry Brigade (Brigadier John Parashuram Dalvi). It consisted of 9 Punjab and 1 Sikh, both at Tawang and 1/9 Gorkha Rifles – at Misamari. 2 Rajput, 4 Grenadiers, 5 Assam Rifles and a company of 6 Mahar also saw operations under the brigade.
- 5 Infantry Brigade (Brigadier Shiv Charan Singh) of the division was removed from operational control of 4 Division and was directly under Headquarters, 33 Corps. It arrived in the foothills of the sector only on 19 November 1962.
- 4 Artillery Brigade (Brigadier Kalyan Singh, replaced by Brigadier GS Gill). Artillery units which were part of the war include elements from 34 Heavy Mortar Battery (from 36 (Maratha) Heavy Mortar Regiment), 17 Parachute Field Regiment, 5 Field Regiment (95, 96 and 97 Field Batteries), 6 Field Regiment (86, 87 and 88 Field Batteries), 22 Mountain Regiment (7 (Bengal) and 2 (Derajat) Mountain Batteries) and 116 Heavy Mortar Battery (from 33 Medium Regiment).

Other brigades involved in the operations in this sector included -

- 62 Infantry Brigade (Brigadier N.K. Lal, replaced by Brigadier Hoshiar Singh) - Part of 20 Infantry Division (Ranchi) and was stationed at Ramgarh before the war; with 1 Sikh, 2 Sikh LI, 4 Sikh LI, 13 Dogra, 4 Garhwal Rifles, (2/8 Gorkha Rifles to 5 Infantry Brigade and 4 Sikh to 11 Infantry Brigade in Walong sector).
- 65 Infantry Brigade (Brigadier G.M. Saeed, replaced by Brigadier A.S. Cheema) - From Hyderabad; with 19 Maratha LI, 4 Rajput and a platoon of 7 Mahar machine-gunners.
- 48 Infantry Brigade (Brigadier Gurbux Singh) - From 17 Infantry Division at Ambala; with 5 Guards, 1 Sikh LI, 1 Madras, a platoon of 7 Mahar machine-gunners and two tanks from 7 Light Cavalry.
- 67 Infantry Brigade (Brigadier M.S. Chatterjee) - from Nagaland; with JAK LI, 6/8 Gorkha Rifles

The forces of the division were ill prepared for the warfare in the mountains and poorly equipped to weather out in the cold climate. Poor leadership and refusal to acknowledge feedback from the forces on the ground (including multiple requests by Brigadier Dalvi for a tactical withdrawal) led to the rout of the Indian forces. 7 Infantry Brigade was effectively destroyed at the Namka Chu ridge on 20 October 1962 during the war. The tactical Headquarters of 4 Infantry Division withdrew from Zemithang on the morning of 21 October 1962. Tawang Garrison with two infantry Battalions and three artillery batteries was abandoned on 23 October 1962. The second phase of the Chinese attack commenced on 17 November 1962, after a lull of 23 days. The division faced further defeat and withdrew from Dirang Dzong in the forenoon of 18 November. The Chinese announced a unilateral cease-fire on 20 November, effective from the midnight of 21/22 November.

Prominent gallantry awards during the war include-

- 4 Garhwal Rifles - was awarded the Battle Honour Nuranang, the only battle honour awarded to any army unit in eastern sector during the 1962 war.
- Param Vir Chakra
  - Subedar Joginder Singh, 1 Sikh
- Maha Vir Chakra
  - Lieutenant Colonel Bejoy Mohan Bhattacharjea, 4 Garhwal Rifles
  - Major Gurdial Singh, 2 Rajput
  - Major Mahander Singh Chaudhary, Punjab
  - Major Sher Pratap Singh Shrikent, 1/9 Gorkha Rifles
  - Captain Mahabir Prasad, (Sikh Regiment) attached to Gorkha Rifles
  - Second Lieutenant Bhagwan Dutt Dogra, 1/9 Gorkha Rifles
  - Second Lieutenant Gopalkrishna Venkatesa Prasanna Rao, 4 Grenadiers
  - Naik Chain Singh, 9 Punjab
  - Sepoy Kanshi Ram, 9 Punjab
  - Rifleman Jaswant Singh Rawat, 4 Garhwal Rifles
  - Sepoy Kewal Singh, (Sikh Regiment) attached to Gorkha Rifles

It was converted to a mountain division in 1963.

== Indo-Pakistani War of 1965 ==
The Red Eagles, less 33 Mountain Brigade were part of the XI Corps tasked to defend Punjab. Being a mountain division, it was inadequately equipped for warfare in the plains. The divisional plan was as under -

- 62 Mountain Brigade - advance on Khemkaran-Kasur Road and capture Rohi Nallah area, cover Khemkaran, secure the Bambawali-Ravi-Bedian Canal (Ichogil Canal) between Ballanwala and Ganda Singh Wala
- 7 Mountain Brigade - to secure the East bank of Ichogil Canal between Bedian and Ballanwala

The order of battle of the division was as follows -

4 Mountain Division (Major General Gurbaksh Singh)

- 9 Horse (Deccan Horse)
- 37 Battalion Punjab Armed Police

7 Mountain Brigade (Brigadier DS Sidhu)

- 1/9 Gorkha Rifles
- 4 Grenadiers
- 7 Grenadiers
- 4 Sikh (after 12 September)
- 2 Mahar (after 12 September)

62 Mountain Brigade (Brigadier HC Gahlaut)

- 13 Dogra
- 9 JAK LI
- 18 Rajputana Rifles

4 Mountain Artillery Brigade (Brigadier Jhanda Singh Sandhu)

- 1 Field Regiment (Self Propelled) (from 2 Independent Armoured Brigade)
- 40 Medium Regiment (from 21 Independent Artillery Brigade)
- 91 Mountain Composite (Towed) Regiment
- 84 Light Regiment
- B Troop, 72 Composite Battery, 20 Locating Regiment
- Battery, 45 Air Defence Regiment
- Air OP

Engineers

- 1 Field Company
- 77 Field Company
- 100 Field Company
- 41 Field Park Company

2 Independent Armoured Brigade (Brigadier TK Theogaraj) (XI Corps reserve)

- 3 Cavalry
- 7 Light Cavalry
- 8 Light Cavalry
- 1 Field Regiment (Self Propelled)
- 74 Assault Field Company
- 1 Dogra

29 Infantry Brigade (from 16 September 1965) (7 Infantry Division)

- 2 Maratha Light Infantry
- 3/9 Gorkha Rifles
- 4 (Independent) Squadron
- 144 Field Regiment (TA)

62 Brigade commenced its attacks on 6 September and secured its objectives, except for the far bund in Rohi Nallah area. 7 Brigade met with stiff opposition. 4 Grenadiers secured the line of Ichhogil canal, but 7 Grenadiers could not secure its objective of capturing Ballanwala. This was followed by heavy enemy shelling. Some units suffered heavy casualties and desertions. Anticipating an armour thrust, the GOC decided to pull back to Asal Uttar on 7 September and hold the enemy. It assumed a ‘horse shoe’ shaped defensive position with Asal Uttar as its focal point. The Pakistani forces, consisting of the 1 Armoured Division and 11 Infantry Division attacked on 8 September. Though some positions of 1/9 Gorkhas and 18 Rajputana Rifles were overrun, 7 and 62 Brigades supported by Deccan Horse and 3 Cavalry were able to repulse the attacks. The Pakistanis launched a second attack on the night of 8 September. This attack was held back by the units of 7 Brigade, supported by armour and artillery and the enemy lost many tanks. Anticipating a wide outflanking manoeuvre from the west, Brigadier Theogaraj moved the major part of his brigade to cover the Lakhna-Mahmudpura-Chima area and flooded part of the approaches to guide the enemy tanks to a trap. As expected, in the morning of 10 September, the Pakistani M-47 and M48 Patton tanks were lured inside the horse-shoe shaped defensive position. They were first held back by the 4 Grenadiers. The battalion held out with great gallantry. This was when Company Quartermaster Havildar Abdul Hamid destroyed three tanks with his recoilless gun (for which he was awarded the Param Vir Chakra). The Pakistanis made multiple attempts to overrun the Indian defences. However, the swampy grounds and the tactical planning of the Indians meant that they suffered heavy losses - which included a total of 97 tanks and many men and senior officers. At the same time, the Indian Army lost only 10 tanks. The bulk of the Pakistani offense withdrew to Khemkaran. The division then made many unsuccessful attempts to capture Khemkaran, without success.

4 Mountain Division suffered 60 killed, 206 wounded and 93 missing in action. The major gallantry awards won during the battle were -

- Param Vir Chakra
  - Company Quartermaster Havildar Abdul Hamid, 4 Grenadiers
- Maha Vir Chakra
  - Major General Gurbaksh Singh, GOC 4 Mountain Division.
  - Brigadier TK Theograj, Commander, 2 Independent Armoured Brigade
  - Lieutenant Colonel Raghubir Singh, Commanding Officer, 18 Rajputana Rifles.
  - Lieutenant Colonel Salim Caleb, Commandant, 3 Cavalry.
  - Lieutenant Colonel AS Vaidya, Commandant, 9 Horse.
- The battle honour Asal Uttar was awarded for the period 9 to 11 September to the following units-
  - 9 Horse (Deccan Horse)
  - 3 Cavalry
  - 91 Mountain Regiment
  - 40 Medium Regiment
  - 4 Grenadiers
  - 18 Rajputana Rifles (now 11 Mechanised Infantry Regiment)
  - 1 Dogra (now 7 Mechanised Infantry Regiment)
  - 2 Mahar
  - 9 Jammu and Kashmir Rifles

== Indo-Pakistani War of 1971 ==
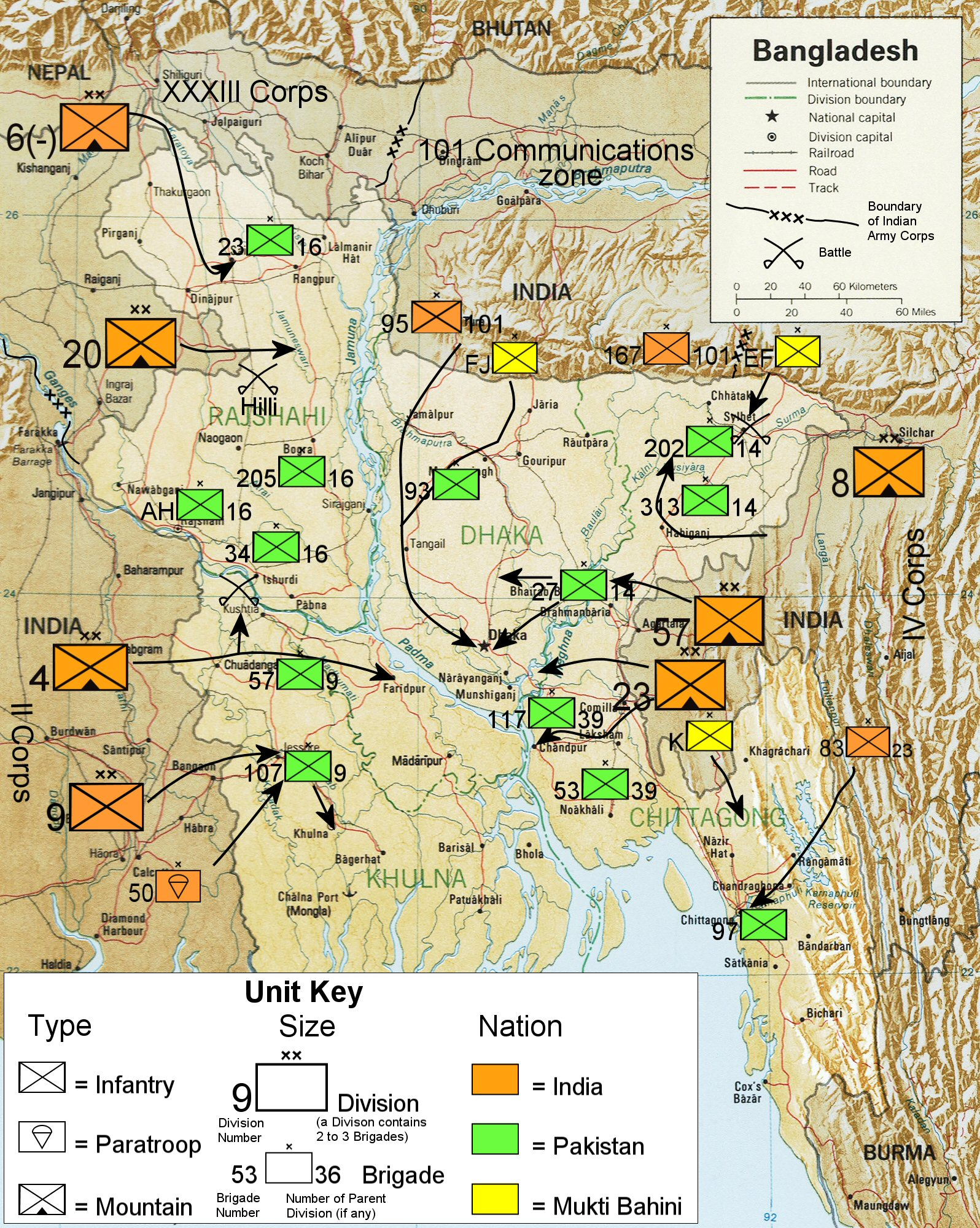
An illustration showing military units and troop movements during operations in the Eastern sector

The division along with 9 Infantry Division was part of the II Corps on the eastern sector. The order of battle (ORBAT) for the division was as follows-

4 Mountain Division (Major General Mohinder Singh Barar)

- 45 Cavalry (A Squadron)

7 Mountain Brigade (Brigadier Zail Singh)

- 22 Rajput
- 5 Jat
- 1 Naga Regiment

41 Mountain Brigade (Brigadier A.H.E. "Tony" Michigan)

- 5 Guards
- 9 Dogra
- 5/1 Gorkha Rifles

62 Mountain Brigade (Brigadier Rajendra Nath)

- 5 Maratha Light Infantry
- 4 Sikh Light Infantry
- 2/9 Gorkha Rifles

4 Mountain Artillery Brigade (Brigadier Baljeet Singh)

- 22 Mountain Regiment
- 194 Mountain Regiment
- 7 Field Regiment
- 181 Light Regiment
- 78 Medium Regiment (1 battery)

Engineers

- 63 Engineer Regiment

Before the outbreak of full-fledged war, 4 Mountain Division had captured the border areas of Jibannagar, Uthali (by 62 Brigade) and Darshana (by 41 Brigade). The divisional plan was to advance on Magura by way of Majdia, Jibannagar, Kotchandpur and Jhenaidah, so as to secure the ferry on the Madhumati river.

After the commencement of operations, Kotchandpur was captured by 62 Brigade on 4 December 1971, though they suffered heavy casualties. 41 Mountain Brigade was tasked to form a block between Chuadanga and Jhenaidah, preventing two Pakistani battalions from moving towards Jhenaidah. 41 Mountain Brigade advanced and captured Jhenaidah and Kaliganj by 7 December. 62 Mountain Brigade captured Magura by 9 December. 7 Mountain Brigade, which had been entrusted to capture Kushtia in the North, met with stiff resistance on 9 December from the Pakistanis, which included armour. 41 Mountain Brigade and 62 Infantry Brigade therefore had to be sent to capture Kushtia. This delay led to 62 and 7 Mountain Brigades resuming their offensive towards Faridpur only on 15 December. By this time, IV Corps had reached Dacca, forcing a Pakistani surrender on 16 December 1971. On 16 December, Major General M.H. Ansari, GOC, Pakistan’s 9 Infantry Division and his divisional staff surrendered to Major General M.S. Barar at Kamarkhali, while his 3,000-strong garrison laid down arms before Brigadier Rajendra Nath at Faridpur.

The major gallantry awards won during the battle were

- Maha Vir Chakra
  - Brigadier A.H.E. Michigan
  - Lieutenant Colonel Chittoor Venugopal, 5/1 Gorkha Rifles
  - Havildar Bir Bahadur Pun, 5/1 Gorkha Rifles
  - Rifleman Pati Ram Gurung, 5/1 Gorkha Rifles
- The battle honour Darsana was awarded to the following units-
  - 45 Cavalry
  - 5/1 Gorkha Rifles

== Present day ==
The 4 Infantry Division is under the I Corps and headquartered at Prayagraj. The division presently consists of -

- 7 Infantry Brigade at Kanpur
- 41 Infantry Brigade at Lucknow
- 62 Infantry Brigade at Kanpur
- 4 Artillery Brigade at Prayagraj
