= Battle of Asal Uttar =

Major battle in the Indo-Pakistani War of 1965

Coordinates: 31.13748°N 74.5530719°E

- Part of Indo-Pakistani war of 1965
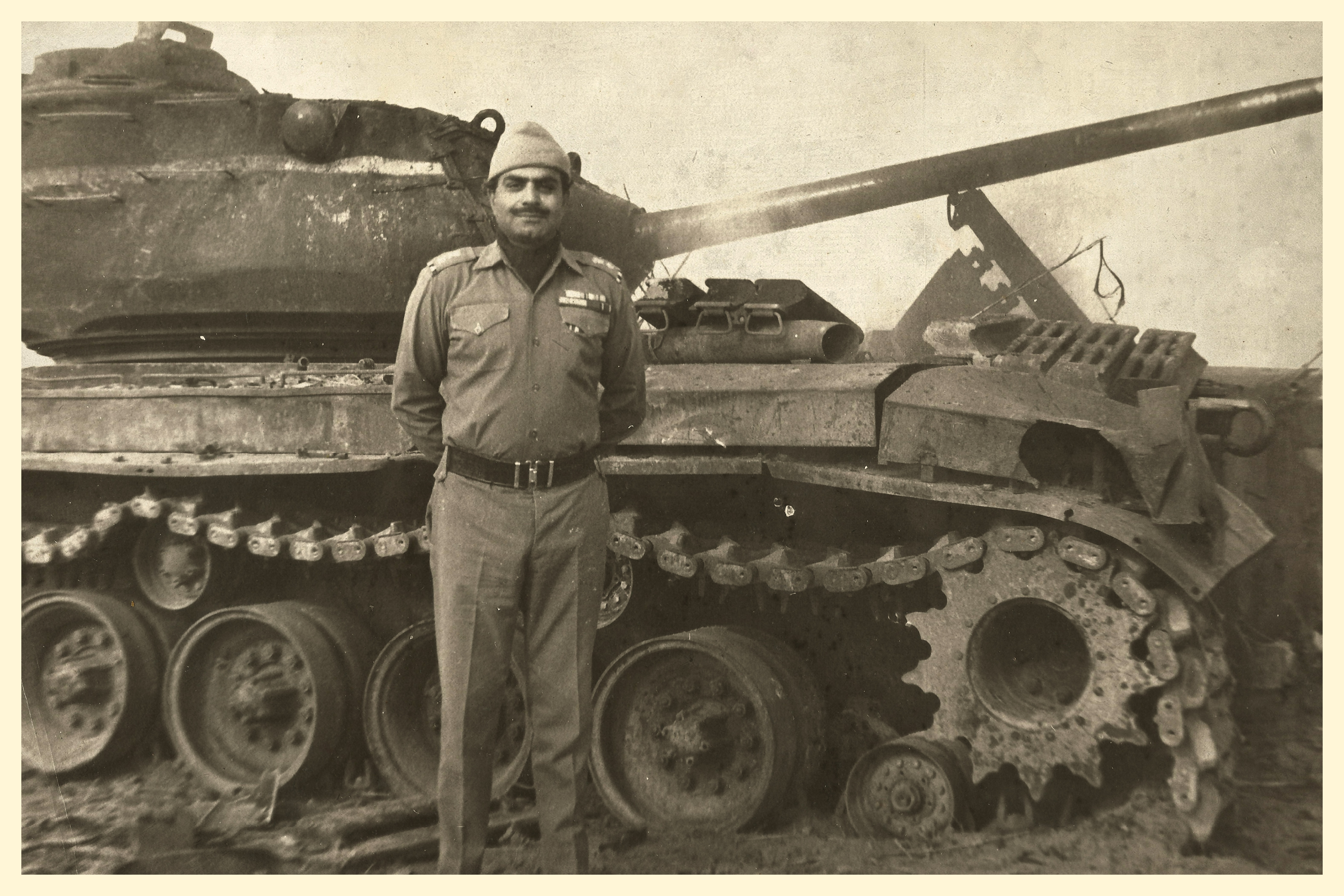
- An Indian officer poses in front of a captured Pakistani M47 Patton.
Date	8–10 September 1965 (2 days)
Location	Asal Uttar, Punjab, India
Result	Indian victory

Belligerents
India	Pakistan

Commanders and leaders
(India) Lt. Gen. Harbaksh Singh; (India) Lt. Gen. J. S. Dhillon; (India) Maj. Gen. Gurbaksh Singh; (India) Brig. Thomas K. Theogaraj	(Pakistan) Maj. Gen Hamid Khan; (Pakistan) Maj. Gen. Nasir Ahmed Khan (WIA); (Pakistan) Brig. A. R. Shami †

Units involved
(India) 4th Mountain Division: 2nd Independent Armoured Brigade; 3rd Cavalry (Centurion Mk7s); 9th Horse (Sherman 75s); 8th Light Cavalry (AMX-13s)	(Pakistan) 1st Armoured Division: 4th Cavalry (Pattons); 5th Horse (M4A1 76mm Shermans); 6th Lancers (Pattons); 24th Cavalry (Pattons); 12th Cavalry (M24 Chaffee); 19th Lancers (Pattons)

Strength
42 x Centurion Mk.VIIs; 42 x Sherman Vs; 42 x AMX-13s; Total: 126	168 x M47 Pattons; 42 x Sherman 76s; 42 x M24 Chaffees; Total: 254

Casualties and losses
10 - 32 tanks damaged	97 tanks destroyed

The Battle of Asal Uttar was one of the largest tank battles of the Indo-Pakistani War of 1965 fought from 8 to 10 September 1965 at Asal Uttar, a village in the Tarn Taran district of Punjab, India. (Note: Asal Uttar is the actual name of the village but it also literally translates to "real reply" or "befitting response" in Hindi.) When the Pakistan Army thrust its tanks and infantry into Indian territory, capturing the Indian town of Khem Karan 5 km from the India–Pakistan border, Indian troops retaliated, and after three days of bitter fighting, the battle ended with the Pakistani forces being repulsed near Asal Uttar. Factors that contributed to this were the fierce fight put up by the Indian Army, conditions of the plains, better Indian tactics and a successful Indian strategy.

It was one of the largest tank battles since the Battle of Kursk in the Second World War and is compared with it for how it changed the course of the Indio-Pakistan war of 1965 in India's favour. War historians, including Philip Towle, regard the Indian resistance near Khem Karan as one of the key turning points of the war, one which tilted the balance of the war in favour of India. Peter Wilson states that the defeat of the Pakistan Army in the battle of Asal Uttar was one of the greatest defeats suffered by Pakistani forces in the course of the Indo-Pakistan war of 1965.

== Background ==
On September 5/6, Indian XI Corps (4th Mountain, 7th and 15th Infantry Divisions, 2nd Independent Armored Brigade) launched its three divisions against Lahore. 4th Mountain Division was on the southern axis, launching from Khemkaran towards Kasur, which lays 6–7 km from the international border. 7th Division was to the north of 4th Mountain Division, also aiming at Kasur from a different direction. But the Indian attack on Kasur was repulsed and the Pakistan army counterattack took the war inside the Indian territory.

== Battle ==
The battle is described as one of the largest tank battles in history since the Battle of Kursk in World War II. Pakistan's invading force, consisting of the 1st Armoured Division and 11th Infantry Division, crossed the India–Pakistan border and captured the Indian town of Khemkaran. Considering the situation, GOC Indian 4th Mountain Division Maj. Gen. Gurbaksh Singh immediately ordered the division to fall back and assume a horseshoe shaped defensive position with Asal Uttar as its focal point. The battle strategy was the brainchild of Brigadier Thomas K. Theogaraj.

On 7 September, 6th Lancers squadron of Pakistan army captured Valtoha against stiff opposition but because of the lack of infantry they had to go back to their Khemkaran basecamp at night in the process a fierce tank battle ensued.

In the night, the Indian troops flooded the sugar cane field, and the next morning, the Pakistani tanks of the 1st Armoured Division, consisting mainly of M47 and M48 Patton tanks, were lured inside the horse-shoe trap. The swampy ground slowed the advance of the Pakistani tanks and many of them could not move because of the muddy slush. Over 97 Pakistani tanks (mostly Pattons, and a few Shermans and Chaffees) were destroyed, including 40+ captured. While the Indians, by their account, lost only 10 tanks during this counter offensive.

== Conclusion ==
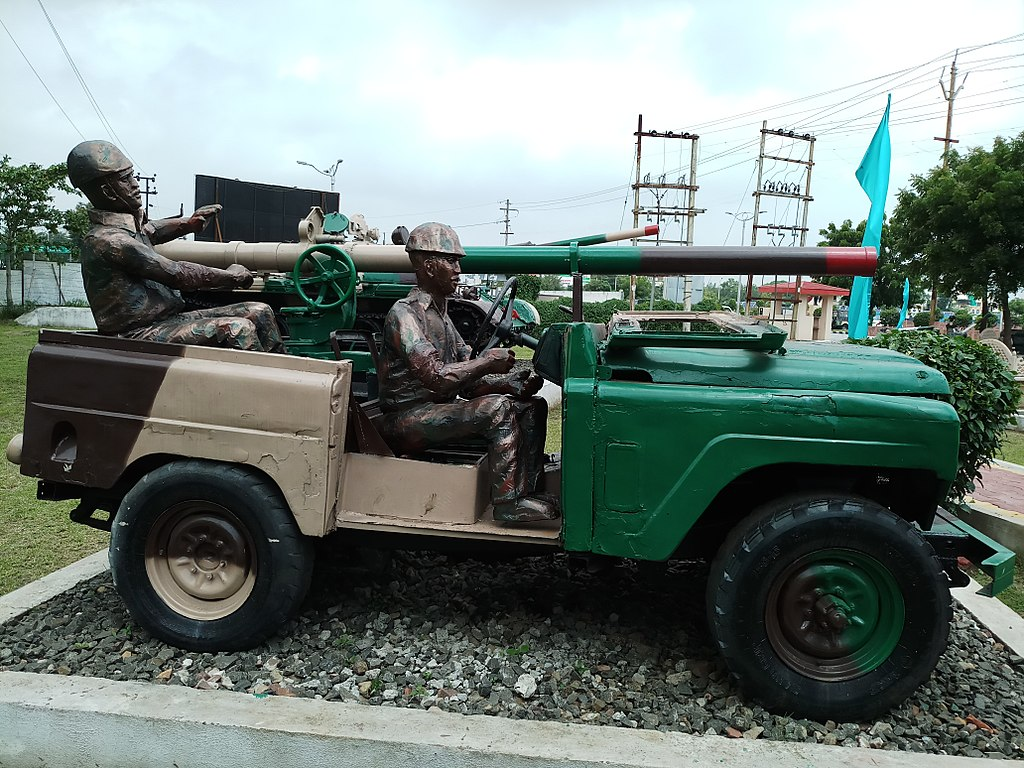
105 mm Jonga-mounted RCL gun, manned by Abdul Hamid, which destroyed a number of tanks during the battle

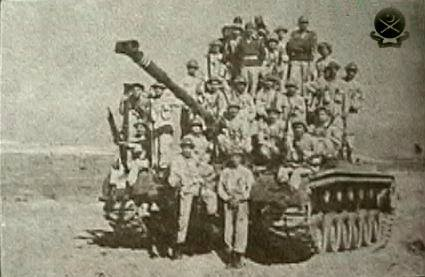
Indian soldiers posing with captured Pakistani Army M48 Patton tank

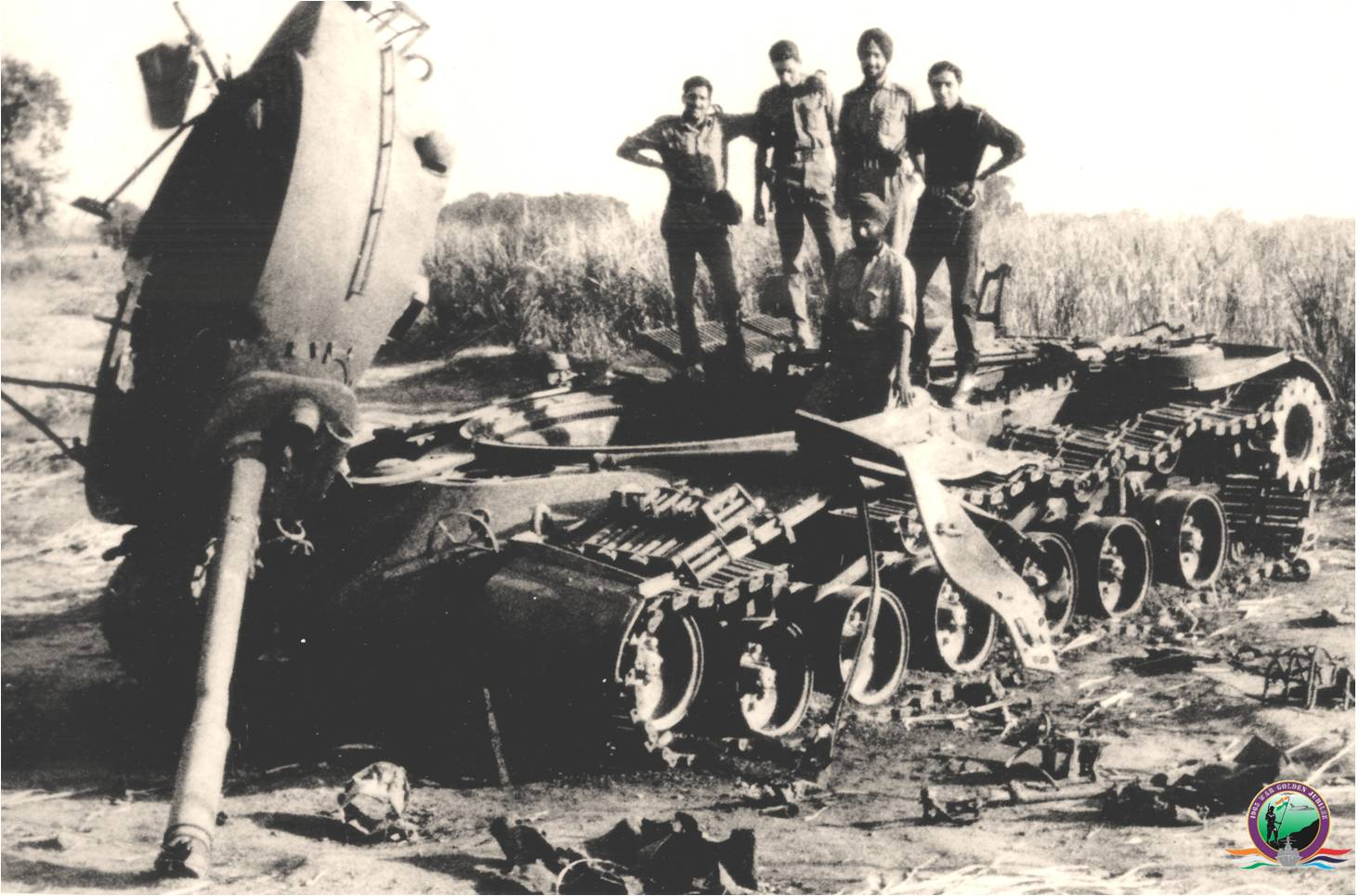
Centurion crewmen from 4th Horse inside a destroyed Pakistani M48 Patton after the battle.

Despite the initial thrust of the Pakistani Army into Indian territory, the battle ended in a decisive Indian victory.

The commander of Pakistani forces Maj. Gen. Nasir Ahmed Khan was killed in action. According to military historian Steven J. Zaloga, Pakistan admitted that it lost 165 tanks during the 1965 war, more than half of which were knocked out during the "debacle" of Asal Uttar.

Pervez Musharraf, later Army Chief and President of Pakistan, participated in this battle as a lieutenant of artillery in the 16 (SP) Field Regiment, 1st Armoured Division Artillery. The battle also witnessed the personal bravery of an Indian soldier, Abdul Hamid, who was honoured with the Param Vir Chakra, India's highest military award, for knocking out seven enemy tanks with a recoilless gun.

After the victory at Asal Uttar, the Indian Army made multiple attempts to recapture the lost town of Khemkaran but these were unsuccessful. Khemkaran remained in Pakistani control till the end of the war and was returned after the Tashkent Agreement.

This battle led to the creation of Patton Nagar (or "Patton City") at the site of the battle. This is because a large number of Patton tanks fielded by the Pakistani forces were either captured or destroyed at the scene.

== Battle honours ==
The honour Asal Uttar was awarded for the period 9 to 11 September to the following units-

Indian side:

- Deccan Horse
- 3 Cavalry
- 91 Mountain Regiment
- 40 Medium Regiment
- 4 Grenadiers
- 18 Rajputana Rifles (now 11 Mechanised Infantry Regiment)
- 1 Dogra (now 7 Mechanised Infantry Regiment)
- 2 Mahar
- 9 Jammu and Kashmir Rifles

Pakistani side:

- 6th Lancers (Watson's Horse)

== Published accounts ==
=== Documentaries ===
Battle of Asal Uttar – Largest Tank Battle Since World War II (2018) is an Indian TV documentary which premiered on the Veer by Discovery series, Mission & Wars.

== Gallery ==
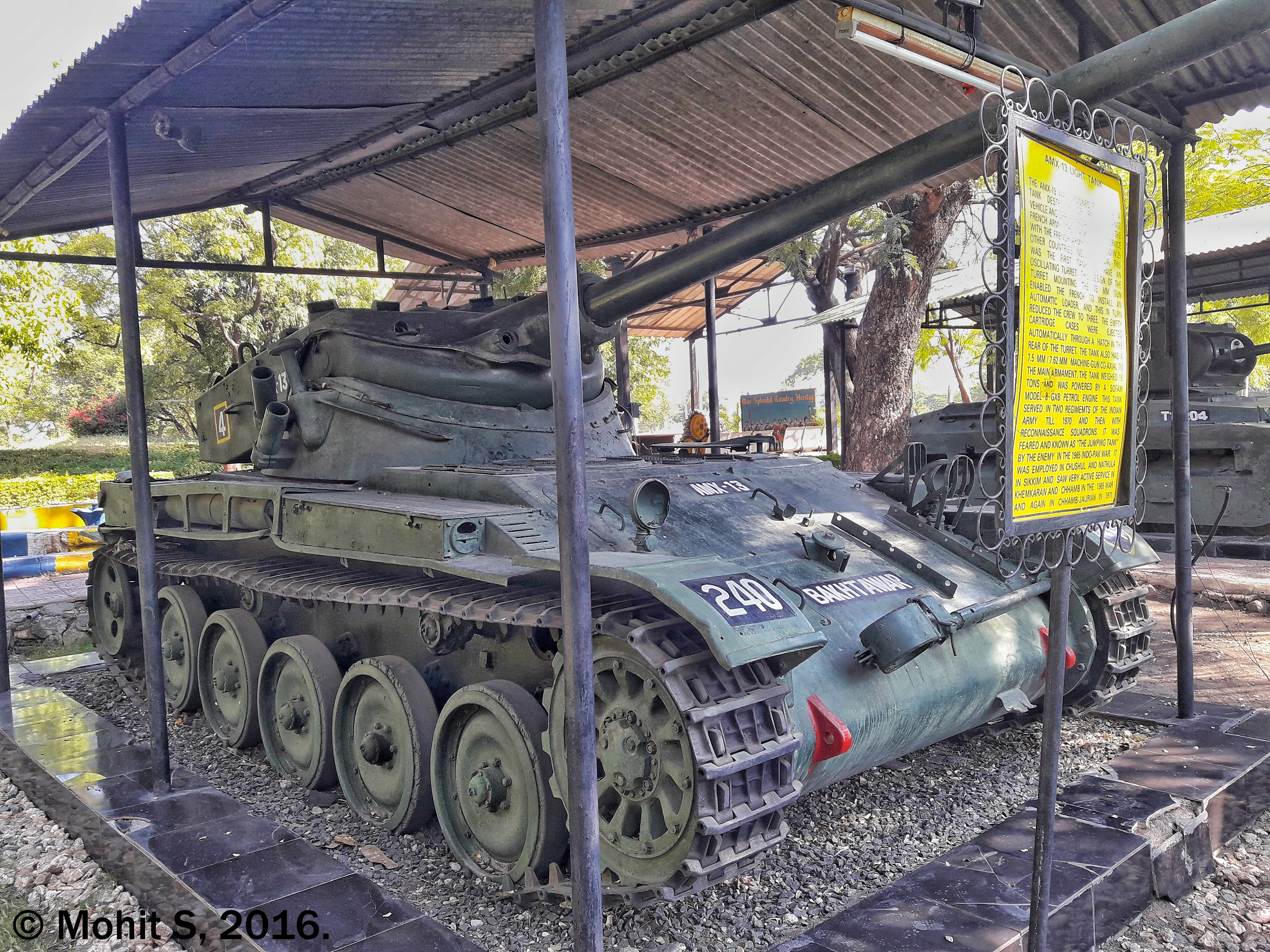
AMX-13 tank displayed at the Ahmednagar Cavalry Tank Museum in India. The AMX-13/75 was one of several types of armour fielded by the Indian Army during the battle

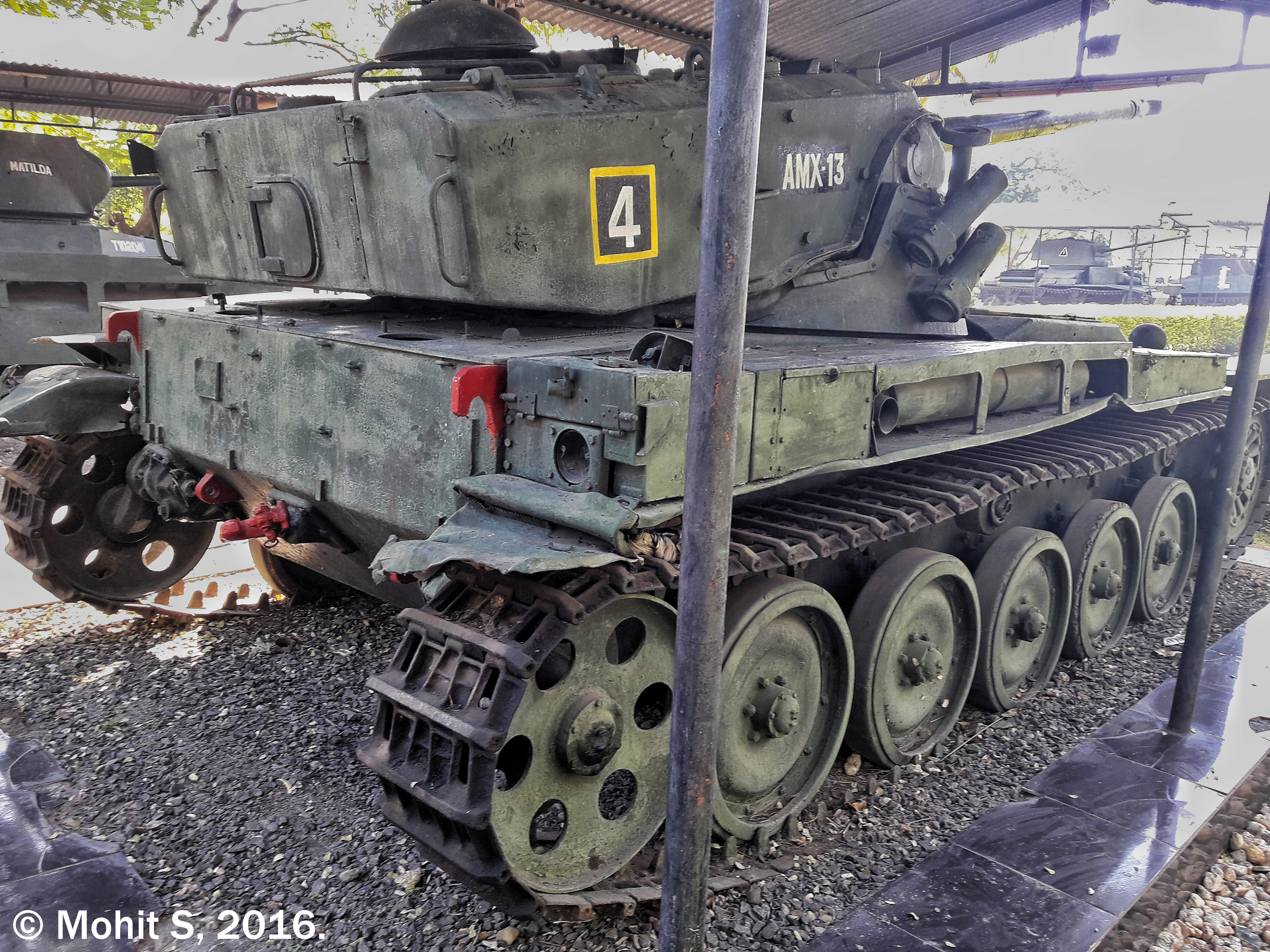
Rear view of the same tank

== See also ==
- Indo-Pakistani wars and conflicts
- Operation Grand Slam
- Battle of Chawinda
- Battle of Phillora

== Resources ==
- 1965 Official War History, Ministry of Defence, Government of India
- The Battle of Assal Uttar: Pakistan and India 1965, Orbat.com, 24 February 2002, archived from the original on 6 November 2006
