= Abdul Hamid (soldier) =

(Param Vir Chakra Winner) Indian Army soldier (1933–1965)

Company Quartermaster Havildar Abdul Hamid PVC
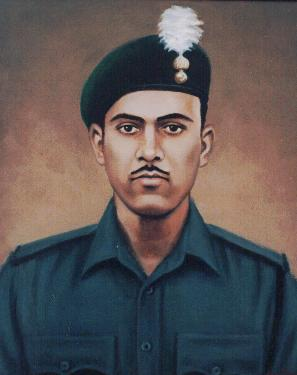
- Born: 1 July 1933; Dhamupur, British Raj
- Died: 10 September 1965 (aged 32); Chima, Khem Karan, Tarn Taran district, Punjab, India
- Spouse: Rasoolan Bibi
- Military career
- Allegiance: India
- Branch: Indian Army
- Service years: 1954–1965
- Rank: Company Quartermaster Havildar
- Unit: 4 Grenadiers
- Conflicts: Sino-Indian War; Indo-Pakistani War of 1965; Battle of Asal Uttar †
- Awards: Param Vir Chakra

Company Quartermaster Havildar Abdul Hamid PVC (1 July 1933 – 10 September 1965), was an Indian soldier. He was posthumously given India's highest military decoration, the Param Vir Chakra, for his actions during the Indo-Pakistani War of 1965.

Hamid joined the army in December 1954, and was posted to the 4th Battalion of the Grenadiers regiment. During the Sino-Indian War, his battalion participated in the battle of Namka Chu against the Chinese People's Liberation Army. During the Indo-Pakistani War of 1965, the 4 Grenadiers battalion was entrusted with a vital position before the village of Chima on the Khem Karan–Bhikhiwind line. At the Battle of Asal Uttar on 9–10 September 1965, Hamid destroyed eight Pakistani tanks and was killed in action while destroying the ninth tank.

== Early life ==
Abdul Hamid was born in the late British Raj to Muslim Indian parents on 1 July 1933 in Dhamupur village in Ghazipur district of Uttar Pradesh state. His mother was Sakina Begum and his father was Mohammad Usman, a tailor. Hamid would help his father's tailoring business by stitching clothes.

== Military career ==
Punjab, India
Jammu and Kashmir, India
Himachal Pradesh, India
Various points of action on map:
1–Bhikhiwind, 2–Chhamb, 3–Jourian, 4–Cheema, 5–Ichogil Canal, 6–Kasur, 7–Khem Karan, 8–Asal Uttar

He joined the Grenadiers regiment of the Indian Army on 27 December 1954. He was later posted to the regiment's 4th Battalion (formerly the 109th Infantry), where he served for the rest of his career. He served with the battalion in Agra, Amritsar, Jammu and Kashmir, Delhi, NEFA and Ramgarh.

During the Sino-Indian War of 1962, Hamid's battalion was part of the 7th Infantry Brigade commanded by Brigadier John Dalvi and participated in the Battle of Namka Chu against the People's Liberation Army. Surrounded and cut off, the battalion broke out on foot into Bhutan and on to Misamari. Second Lieutenant G. V. P. Rao was posthumously awarded the Maha Vir Chakra for his actions during the war; it was the highest gallantry award received by the battalion since Indian independence, until Hamid's commendation.

=== Indo-Pakistani War of 1965 ===
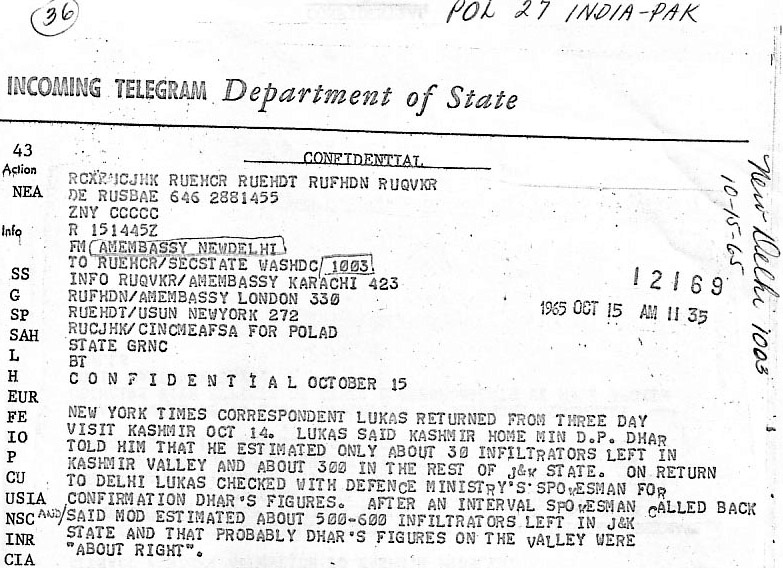
A declassified US State Department telegram that confirms the existence of hundreds of infiltrators in the Indian state of Jammu and Kashmir.

As a prelude to Operation Gibraltar, Pakistan's strategy to infiltrate Jammu and Kashmir, and start a rebellion against Indian rule, Pakistani forces attempted a series of incursions across the Jammu and Kashmir border. From 5 to 10 August 1965, Indian troops uncovered a mass infiltration. Captured documents and prisoners revealed Pakistan's plans to capture Kashmir with a guerrilla attack were brought to light; about 30,000 guerrillas were trained by the Pakistanis for this purpose. For reasons which remain unknown, the guerrilla troops were dispersed, dissipated or destroyed and the action never took place. Haji Phir and Phir Saheba were captured by India in an attempt to eliminate the guerrilla bases, and Pakistan launched an offensive which captured Chhamb and Jourian. Indian Air Force bases in Amritsar were also attacked.

In a counter-offensive, India launched operations across the international border. The 4th Infantry Division was charged with the capture of Pakistani territory east of the Ichogil Canal (Note: According to another source, XVI Corps was charged with the task.) and the suppression of a possible attack along the Kasur–Khem Karan axis. After reaching the canal, the division awaited a Pakistani assault. 4 Grenadiers was entrusted with a vital position before the village of Chima [Cheema Khurd village 8 km from Khem Karan village] on the Khem Karan–Bhikhiwind axis.

==== Battle of Asal Uttar ====
4 Grenadiers arrived at midnight on 7–8 September, and had dug 3-foot (0.91 m) trenches by dawn. At 7:30 am they heard the first rumbles of Pakistani tanks, which straddled the road an hour and a half later. Hamid led the Jonga-mounted recoilless rifle (RCLR) detachment of his battalion. The battalion held their fire until a tank 30 feet (9.1 m) away was hit by Hamid with his RCL gun, and Pakistani soldiers in the two following tanks fled. The Indians experienced artillery shelling at 11:30 am, followed by another armour attack. Hamid knocked out another tank, and the Pakistani soldiers in the following tanks again fled. By the end of the day, an engineering company had laid anti-personnel and anti-tank mines around the Grenadiers' position.

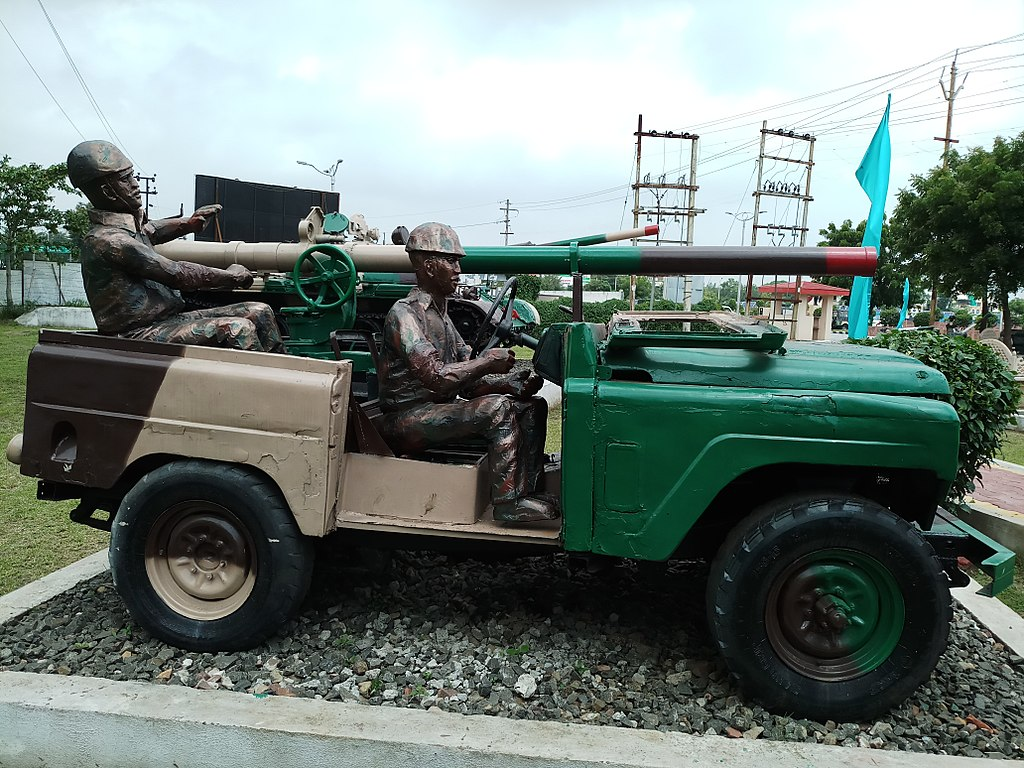
105 mm Jonga-mounted RCL gun, manned by Hamid, which destroyed eight tanks during the battle

Their battalion was attacked by Pakistani Sabre jets at 9:00 am on 9 September, with mass casualties. The Pakistanis made armoured attacks at 9:30, 11:30 am and 2:30 pm. By the evening, Hamid had knocked out four tanks. The Pakistani battalion destroyed a total of 13 tanks, and many of which they eventually abandoned during the battle. The Indians too withdrew a squadron of Sherman tanks, which were ineffective against the US built Pakistani Patton tanks. Centurion tanks were also withdrawn to deploy them in a position more suitable for a tank battle. As a result, the 4 Grenadiers were left with only RCL guns and mines.

On 10 September at about 8:00 am the first wave of three tanks, one leading and the other two following at a 200-yard (180 m) distance, arrived. Hamid knocked out another tank with his RCL gun. The Pakistanis attacked again with increased artillery support at 9:00 am, and Hamid destroyed another tank. Since his open jeep was vulnerable to the shelling, he moved to another position and ordered his men to take cover. Hamid and a Pakistani tank soon spotted each other. Alone and unable to change his position, he fired at the tank as it fired at him and he was killed instantly. The battalion suppressed further attacks by the Pakistanis, and the battle was a decisive Indian victory.

==== Param Vir Chakra ====
For his actions at the Battle of Asal Uttar, Hamid was awarded the Param Vir Chakra on 10 September 1965. The official citation read:

At 0800 hours on 10 September 1965 Pakistan forces launched an attack with a regiment of Patton tanks on a vital area ahead of village Cheema on the Bhikkiwind road in the Khem Karan Sector. Intense artillery shelling preceded the attack. The enemy tanks penetrated the forward position by 0900 hours. Realising the grave situation, Company Quartermaster Havildar Abdul Hamid who was commander of a RCL gun detachment moved out to a flanking position with his gun mounted on a jeep, under intense enemy shelling and tank fire. Taking an advantageous position, he knocked out the leading enemy tank and then swiftly changing his position, he sent another tank up in flames. By this time the enemy tanks in the area spotted him and brought his jeep under concentrated machine-gun and high explosive fire. Undeterred, Company Quartermaster Havildar Abdul Hamid kept on firing on yet another enemy tank with his recoilless gun. While doing so, he was mortally wounded by an enemy high explosive shell. Havildar Abdul Hamid’s brave action inspired his comrades to put up a gallant fight and to beat back the heavy tank assault by the enemy. His complete disregard for his personal safety during the operation and his sustained acts of bravery in the face of constant enemy fire were a shining example not only to his unit but also to the whole division and were in the highest traditions of the Indian Army.

— Gazette of India Notification No.111—Press/65,

== Military decorations ==

Param Vir Chakra		
Samar Seva Star	Raksha Medal	Sainya Seva Medal

== Legacy ==
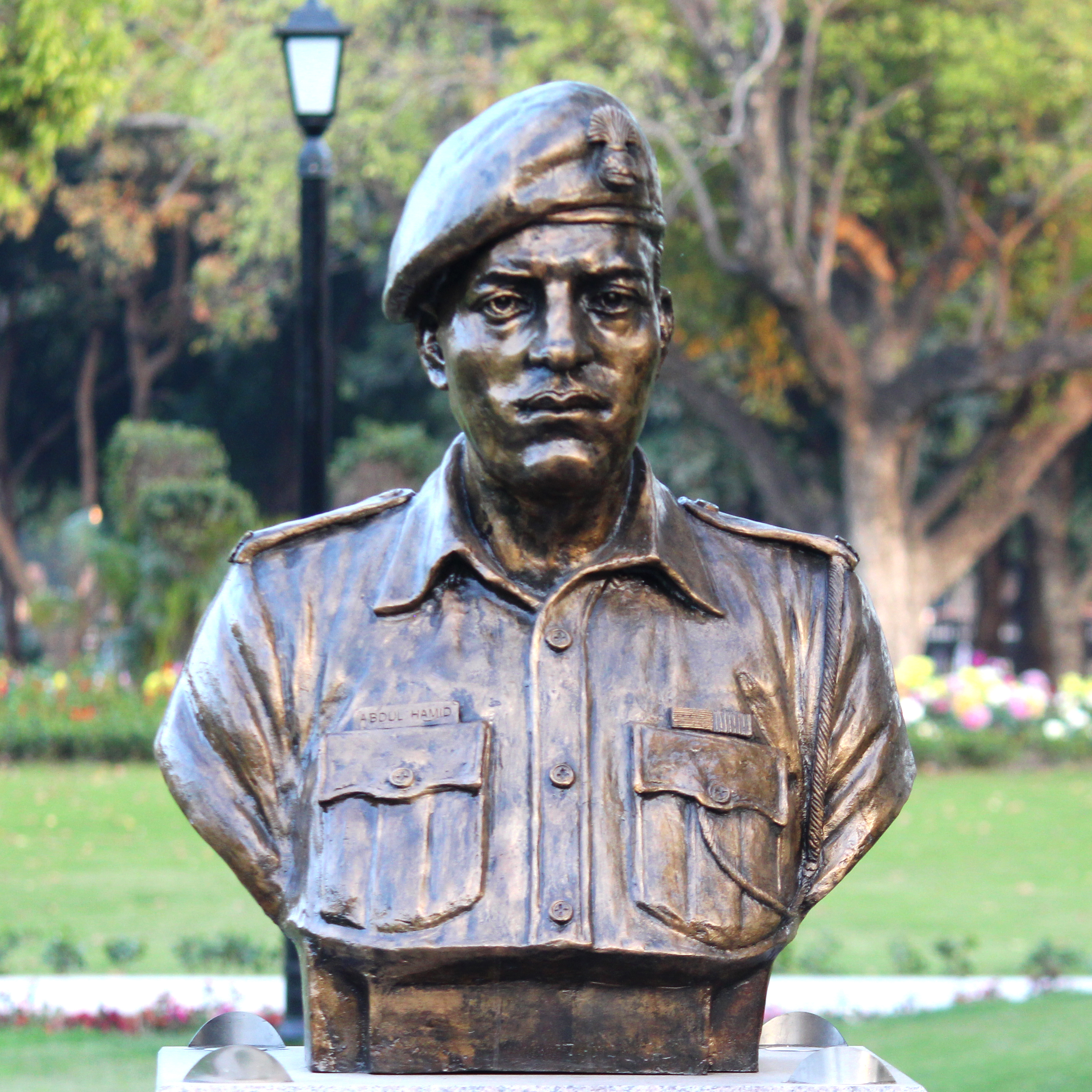
Abdul Hamid's bust at Param Yodha Sthal, National War Memorial, New Delhi.

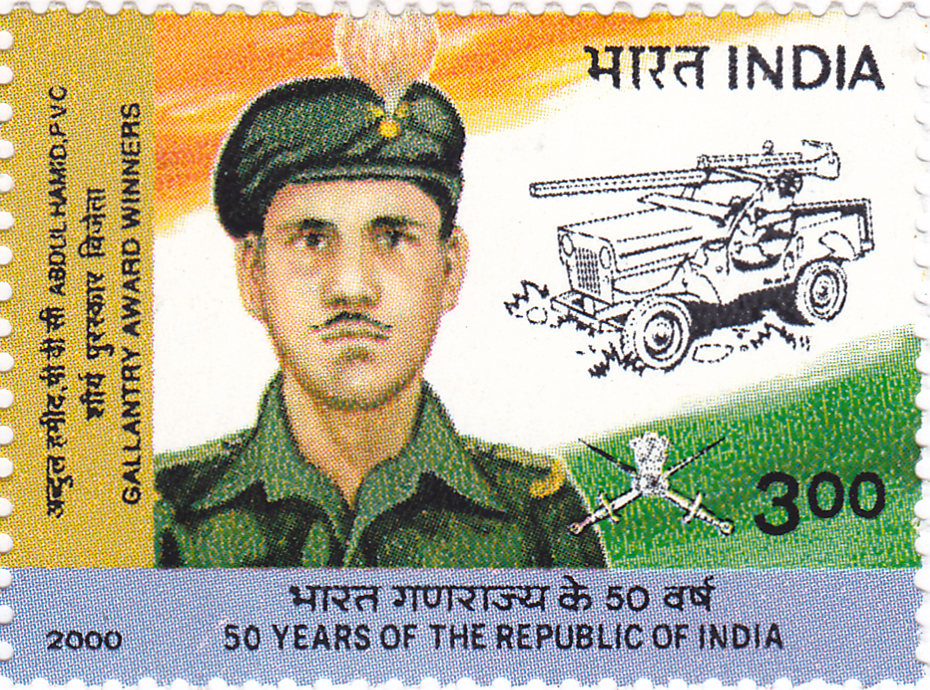
Abdul Hamid stamp of India released in the year 2000.

National monument at New Delhi: The Param Yodha Sthal at the National War Memorial houses the busts of all the 21 recipients of the Param Vir Chakra, India's highest military award, including Abdul Hamid.

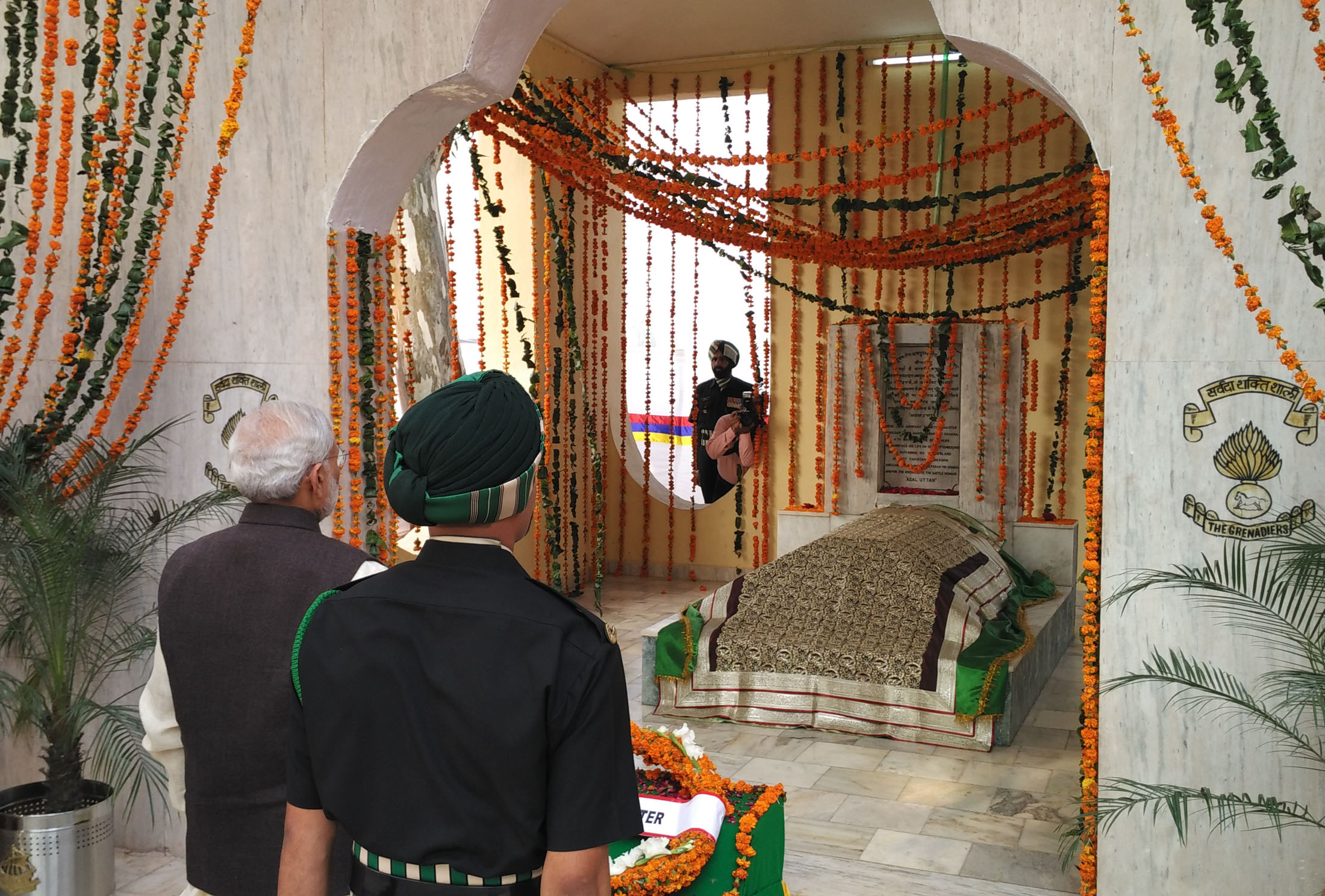
The Prime Minister of India, Narendra Modi, lays a wreath at the memorial of Abdul Hamid, PVC, at Asal Uttar, in Punjab on 11 November 2015.

Grave and memorial at Asal Uttar (Cheema Khurd): Abdul Hamid's grave and a memorial dedicated to the Battle of Asal Uttar are situated 400 meters south of Cheema Village, along the NH354 Khemkaran-Bhikkiwind road in Punjab's Tarn Taran district. In 2015, the Prime Minister of India, Narendra Modi paid tribute to Abdul Hamid, and laid a wreath at his tomb, honoring his bravery and supreme sacrifice. Every year, there is big sports and culture fair is organized in Asal Uttar village on 9 September in the memory of Abdul Hamid.

An island named after him in Andaman and Nicobar Islands: On January 23, 2023, the Government of India announced naming of 21 islands in the Andaman and Nicobar region in honor of recipients of the Param Vir Chakra. One of these islands was named Hamid Island as a tribute to Abdul Hamid. This memorial set up inside a garden has Hamid's tomb, memorial obelisks in honor of each of the fallen Indian heroes of the Battle of Asal Uttar, a captured Pakistani Patton tank, information center on the Battle of Asal Uttar, and visitor facilities such as washroom.

Memorial and garden at his village Dhamupur: Hamid's widow, Rasoolan Bibi, met Indian President Pratibha Patil in Lucknow in 2008 with requests to establish a military-recruiting center in his village, convert Hamid's home in Dullapur into a memorial, observe his death anniversary at the national level and help her grandchildren obtain government employment.Consequently, in 2012 a memorial to Hamid in his home village of Dhamupur which had fallen into disrepair was renovated by the Flags of Honour Foundation for the 46th anniversary of his death. The renovation included a new statue of Hamid, repairs and painting of the gates and boundary, and improvements to the garden housing the statue named after him as the Veer Abdul Hamid Park. Indian Member of Parliament Rajeev Chandrasekhar, founder of Flags of Honour, spoke on the occasion. On 10 September 2017, the 52nd anniversary of Hamid's death, then Chief of the Army Staff General Bipin Rawat unveiled a memorial in Ghazipur district.

School named after him at his village Dhamupur: A school in Dhamupur village, where Abdul Hamid studied during his childhood, was renamed Shaheed Hamid Vidyalaya in his honor. However, in 2025, the Basic Education Department replaced his name with PM Shri Composite School, sparking outrage across the country. Hamid's grandson, Jameel Ahmad, protested and escalated the matter to the headmaster and the local head of the Basic Education Department. In an attempt to defuse the situation, education officials wrote Hamid's name on a wall, which only intensified the uproar. Eventually, the school was renamed Shaheed Veer Abdul Hamid PM Shri Composite School on February 18, 2025.

India Post's stamp commemorating him: A ₹3 stamp commemorating Hamid was issued by India Post on 28 January 2000 as part of a set of five stamps honouring recipients of awards for gallantry. The stamp has a bust of Hamid and an illustration of a jeep with a rifle.

Chapter on him in national School curriculum: A chapter on Veer Abdul Hamid, along with a poem on the National War Memorial, has been added to the Class 6 NCERT curriculum. This initiative aims to instill patriotism and honor the sacrifices of Indian soldiers.

== In popular culture ==
The tenth episode of Param Vir Chakra, a 1988 TV series on the lives of Param Vir Chakra recipients, explored Hamid's actions on 10 September 1965. Hamid was played by Naseeruddin Shah, and the episode was directed by Chetan Anand.

=== Documentaries ===
Battle of Asal Uttar – Largest Tank Battle Since World War II (2018) is a TV documentary which premièred on Veer by Discovery Channel series, Mission & Wars.

Story of CQMH Abdul Hamid released by the Indian Army detailing the events of the battle and his death.

== Notes ==
Footnotes

Citations
