= 91 Field Regiment (India) =

Indian Army artillery unit

91 Field Regiment (Asal Uttar)
- Active: 1963 – present
- Country: India
- Allegiance: India
- Branch: Indian Army
- Type: Artillery
- Size: Regiment
- Motto(s): SARVATRA, IZZAT-O-IQBAL “Everywhere with Honour and Glory”.
- Colors: "Red & Navy Blue"

Insignia
- Abbreviation: 91 Fd Regt

91 Field Regiment (Asal Uttar) is part of the Regiment of Artillery of the Indian Army.

== Formation ==
91 Field Regiment was raised as 91 Mountain Composite (Towed) Regiment on 15 April 1963 at Ambala Cantonment under the command of Lieutenant Colonel (later Colonel) PR Jesus, SM. It was equipped with three batteries of 3.7-inch mountain howitzers and one battery of 120 mm Tampella mortars. The regiment was later converted to a ‘medium regiment’ and is presently a ‘field regiment’.

== Class composition ==
The unit is a ‘Single Class’ regiment composed entirely of Rajput gunners.

== Operations ==
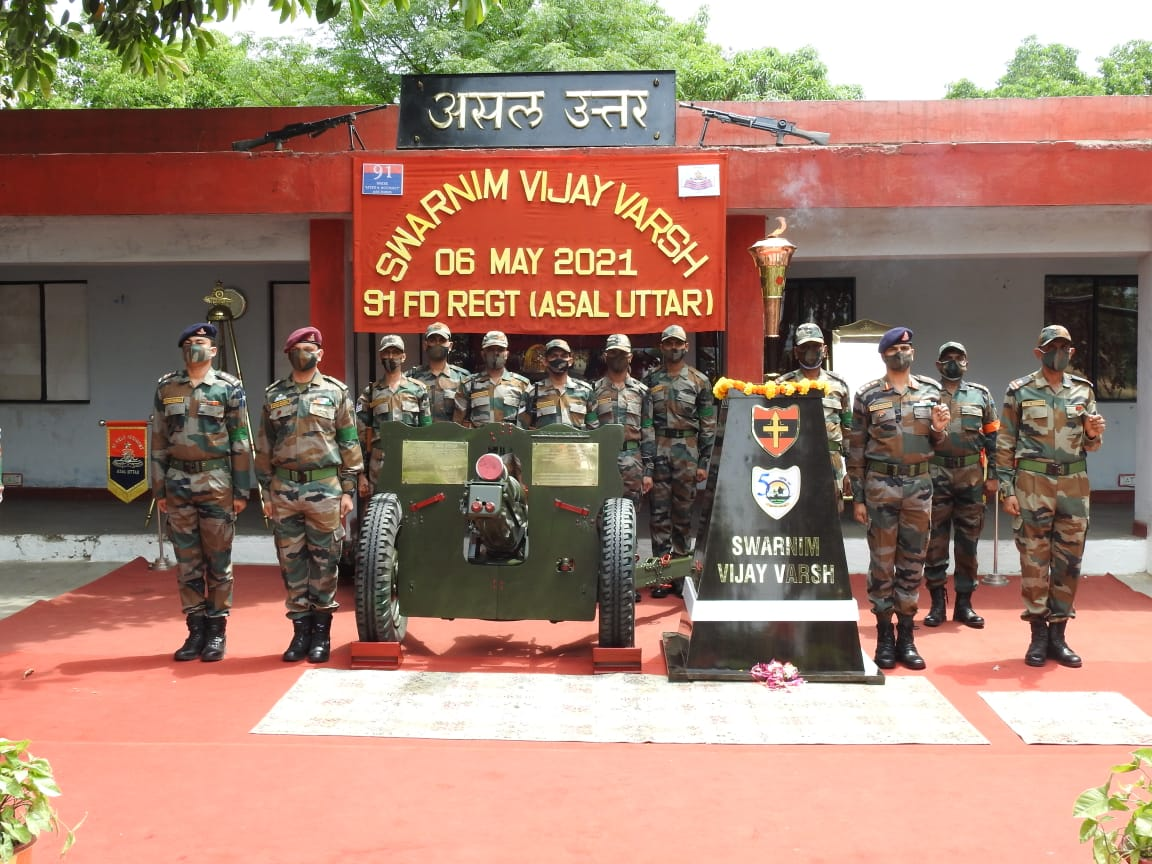
A ceremony held in May 2021 to mark the Golden Jubilee of the 1971 Indo Pakistan War. The ‘war trophy’ can be seen in the foreground.

Indo-Pakistani War of 1965

The regiment took part in Operation Ablaze and Operation Riddle during the 1965 war. The regiment was deployed near Manawala village in Khem Karan Sector. It was part of the 4 Mountain Artillery Brigade (under Brigadier Jhanda Singh Sandhu) of 4 Mountain Division (under Major General Gurbaksh Singh). On the night of 7 September 1965, the gun position of the regiment was raided by the enemy. In spite of being heavily outnumbered, the regiment held its ground and the raid was repulsed after a deadly fight lasting two hours. On 8 September, the gun position was heavily shelled by the Pakistani artillery and later rocketed, bombed and strafed by Sabre jets of the Pakistani Air Force. On the night of 9 September, the regiment faced an infantry attack supported by a squadron each of Chaffee and Patton tanks. In this action, the guns were pulled out from their gun pits and the enemy tanks were engaged by direct firing, leading to destruction of or damage to 14 tanks. The regiment lost one JCO and three ORs in the action. The regiment joined the main battle in the sector on 10 September. It fired more than 2000 rounds in one night in support of the infantry. On 13 September, Captain VN Bhatia captured a Pakistani armoured personnel carrier and brought it back intact.

For its gallant efforts, the regiment was awarded the Honour Title of “Asal Uttar”. In commemoration of the valiant action, the regiment was awarded a 3.7 inch howitzer as a ‘war trophy’ on 28 September 1989 by the then General Officer Commanding (GOC) of 24 Infantry Division – Major General Surinder Singh, AVSM. The war trophy has since been kept in the regimental quarter guard and symbolises the heroic heritage of the regiment.

Other operations

The regiment has also taken part in the following operations:

- Indo-Pakistani War of 1971: Operation Cactus Lily
- Operation Trident
- Operation Rakshak
- Operation Kasba
- Operation Parakram
- Operation Meghdoot

== Honours and awards ==
The regiment has won the following honours:

- Honour title – Asal Uttar
- Sena Medal – 2
- Param Vishisht Seva Medal (PVSM) – 1
- COAS Commendation Cards – 7
- VCOAS Commendation Cards – 3
- GOC-in-C Commendation Cards – 7

== See also ==
- List of artillery regiments of Indian Army
