= General Scarlett =

General Scarlett may refer to:

- James Yorke Scarlett (1799–1871), British Army general
- Percy Scarlett (1885–1957), British Army major general
- William Scarlett, 3rd Baron Abinger (1826–1892), British Army lieutenant general
