= 40 Field Regiment (India) =

Indian Army artillery unit

40 Field Regiment (Asal Uttar)
- Active: 1943 – present
- Country: India
- Allegiance: British India; India
- Branch: British Indian Army; Indian Army
- Type: Artillery
- Role: Field Regiment
- Nickname: Roaring Forty
- Mottos: SARVATRA, IZZAT-O-IQBAL "Everywhere With Honour and Glory".
- Colors: "Red & Navy Blue"
- Anniversaries: Raising day - 1 February; Asal Uttar Day - 7 September
- Equipment: Indian Field Gun
- Battle honours: Asal Uttar

Insignia
- Abbreviation: 40 Fd Regt (Asal Uttar)

40 Field Regiment (Asal Uttar), nicknamed the Roaring Forty is part of the Regiment of Artillery of the Indian Army.

== Formation ==
The Regiment was raised at Risalpur (presently in Pakistan) as 8 Indian Field Regiment on 1 February 1943 with the troop nucleus being of South Indian classes. The Batteries were designated as 19, 20 and 21 Field Batteries. The first commanding officer was Lieutenant Colonel WMC Wall and the regiment was then equipped with 25 Pounder guns.

== History ==
The Regiment became the first medium regiment of the Indian Army on 1 October 1944, when it was re-equipped with 5.5" guns. It was later re-designated initially as the 1st Indian Medium Regiment and subsequently as 40 Medium Regiment in order to avoid duplication of numbers in the Regiment of Artillery. One battery was disbanded and the other two batteries were redesignated as 1 Medium Battery and 2 Medium Battery respectively. In 1953, the batteries were also re-numbered as 28 and 29 Medium Batteries. In January 1966, a third battery was raised as 403 Battery.

The regiment was awarded with the prestigious Asal Uttar honour title for its exemplary display in the Battle of Asal Uttar in the 1965 Indo-Pak War. It acquired the status of a medium self propelled unit, when it was equipped with the M-46 Catapult, which had 130 mm guns mounted on a Vijayanta chassis. The regiment has subsequently converted to a field artillery regiment and is now equipped with Indian Field Guns.

The Regiment also had the honour of carrying Mahatma Gandhi's ashes for immersion in the Damodar River in Ramgarh on one of its guns in 1948.

The regiment had the honour to participate in the Republic Day Parade in 1979 with their 130 mm towed guns and in 1987 and 1989 with their Catapults.

== Operations ==
Some of the major operations undertaken by the Regiment include:

Hyderabad Police Action (1948)
2nd Medium battery moved to Hyderabad in May 1948 in support of Smash Force / 1 Armoured Division to quell an armed insurrection aimed against the formal union of this princely state with the Union of India. Two guns recovered during the action, are exhibited at the unit's Quarter Guard.

Indo-Pakistani War of 1947–1948
1 Medium Battery participated in the J & K Operations to counter the armed incursion into the State. The 5.5" guns were dismantled and air-lifted in Dakotas to Kashmir. Exemplary courage and gallantry was displayed by Capt. Dara Dinshaw Mistri in the Naushera Sector on 15 December 1948. He was posthumously awarded the Maha Vir Chakra (MVC) for display of bravery and gallant action. (This was the first MVC in the Regiment of Artillery).

The official citation reads:

Captain DARA DINSHAW MISTRI (IC-1857), 1st Medium Battery—40 Medium Regiment Artillery. (Posthumous)

On 15 Dec 48, at Chhawa Ridge ia the Naushera Sector, Capt. D. D. MISTRI was the Observation Officer of the forwardmost picquet, when the hostiles relentlessly shelled his position using every type of artillery from 3.7 howitzer to 5.5" mortar guns.

In spite of this murderous fire, Capt. MISTRI stuck to his post, and it was due to his fearless conduct that the hostile guns were pinpointed in that sector. He was also able to confirm the presence of enemy Sherman Tanks in the Sandoa village area and remained at his post when these tanks engaged his picquet for more than two hours.

He would not listen to the entreaties of the platoon commander to seek safety but continued to observe and pass back the information to the guns.

On one occasion more than a dozen shells straddled his O.P. but still undaunted he remained there till a 75 m.m. shell hit his position killing him instantaneously.

By day and by night this gallant officer continued to be the watch dog; of the picquet. His personal courage, unparalleled gallantry and devotion to duty with utter disregard for personal safety was a source of inspiration to all ranks on the picquet and worthy of the highest praise.

— Gazette Notification: 5 Pres/43, 439-40.21-06-1950.

Indo-Pak War (1965)
In September 1965, the Regiment was located in Meerut, when it received the mobilisation orders. The Regiment was part of Operation Riddle in the Khemkaran-Kasur Sector in which Pakistan's 1 Armoured Division advanced towards East of the Icchogil Canal. The Regiment with its 5.5" guns fired over 13,000 rounds at Kasur town, which halted the Pakistani advance for a day. The regiment lost two officers (2nd Lieutenant IK Gupta and 2nd Lieutenant LS Modi) in this operation.

Indo-Pakistani War of 1971
The Regiment's batteries were located at three different places when it received its mobilisation orders. One Battery (403 Medium Battery) stuck to their guns in Sikkim which could not be diverted to participate in the Operations. Without the 403 Medium Battery, 28 Medium Battery equipped with 5.5-inch medium guns headed towards Dacca from Agartala RHQ and 29 Medium Battery entered the then East Pakistan (present day Bangladesh) from Bhajanpur. The 28 Medium Battery of the regiment was one of the first artillery troops to reach Dacca.

1973 Provincial Armed Constabulary revolt
On 22 May 1973, the Regiment was deployed for internal security duties at Varanasi to aid the civil authorities to quell the armed insurrection by the Uttar Pradesh Provincial Armed Constabulary (PAC) at Ramnagar and Chunar. One officer (Major N. N. Jally) and 10 other ranks were killed, but the rebellion was successfully quelled. Four Sena Medals were awarded to the Regiment. 500 PAC personnel surrendered to the Commanding Officer during the operation.

Others
The Regiment has participated in -

- One officer and six other ranks took part in Operation Pawan in Sri Lanka.
- Counter insurgency operations in Punjab as part of Operation Rakshak I and II in Ludhiana, Rajpura and Faridkot.
- The unit was part of 33 Artillery Brigade during Operation Parakram (2002).
- It was part of 3rd Infantry Division in the Siachen conflict in 2006.
- Operation Rhino - counter terrorist operations in Udalguri district, Assam.
- Operation Vajr Strike

== Awards and citations ==
The regiment has the following awards and citations -

- Honour title- Asal Uttar
- GOC-in-C Northern Command Unit Appreciation
- Maha Vir Chakra- Captain Dara Dineshaw Mistry
- Sena Medals-
1. Major Ramnath
2. Naik A Poulose (posthumous)
3. Lance Naik Sundram
4. Lance Naik S Swamy Dam
5. Gunner Seshathiri
6. Captain Harish Raman
- Chief of Army Staff Commendation Cards- 8
- GOC-in-C Commendation Cards- 14

== Equipment ==
The regiment has had the following guns in chronological order -

- 25 Pounder guns - 1943-44
- 5.5 Inch Gun - 1944-78
- M-46 130 mm Field Gun - 1978-84
- M-46 Catapult - 1984-2006 and 2008-2014
- Indian Field Gun - 2006-8 and 2014 onwards

== Sports ==
The following personnel from the unit have participated at international and service levels -

International

1. Nk Nageshwar Rao- Paragliding

Services

1. Sub Nanjappa- Athletics
2. Hav Jyoti Dev- Athletics
3. Nb Sub PB Thimmaiah- Boxing
4. Nk Sajeev P Basu- Volleyball
5. Hav Y Papa Rao- Athletics

== See also ==
- List of artillery regiments of Indian Army
