= Dhamupur =

- Village
- Location in Uttar Pradesh, India Dhamupur (India)
- Coordinates: 25.45°N 83.25°E
- Country: India
- State: Uttar Pradesh
- District: Ghazipur district

Languages
  - Official: Hindi
- Time zone: UTC+5:30 (IST)
- PIN: 275202
- Nearest city: Ghazipur

Dhamupur is a village in the Jakhania taluka of Ghazipur district in Uttar Pradesh State, India.

== Notable personalities ==
- Company Quartermaster Havildar Abdul Hamid, who was posthumously awarded the Param Vir Chakra - India's highest gallantry award for displaying exemplary courage in the 1965 India-Pakistan war was born in this village.
