= 194 Field Regiment (India) =

Indian Army artillery unit

- Active: 1966 – present
- Country: India
- Allegiance: India
- Branch: Indian Army
- Type: Artillery
- Size: Regiment
- Nickname: Champions
- Mottos: Sarvatra, Izzat-O-Iqbal (Everywhere with Honour and Glory); Avirat, Achook, Adwitiya
- Colors: Red & Navy Blue
- Anniversaries: 21 January– Raising Day

Insignia
- Abbreviation: 194 Fd Regt

The 194 Field Regiment is part of the Regiment of Artillery of the Indian Army.

== Formation and history ==
The regiment was raised as 194 Mountain Regiment on 21 January 1966 at Babina. The first commanding officer was Lieutenant Colonel Keith Shortlands. The regiment has subsequently been converted to a field and medium regiment and is presently a field regiment. 194 was raised as unit with pure class composition of batteries ie Sikh, Ahirs and Dogras. The unit converted to all class composition in the year 1999.

From the time it was raised, the regiment has mastered five different equipments, has experience in serving in Counter Insurgency / Counter Terrorism Operations, Line of Control environment, High altitude as well as peace tenures. The regiment has covered the expanse of Northern India in its length and width and has the honour of participating in multiple operations. Major KK Puri along with two JCOs and 50 ORs made the regiment proud by marching down Rajpath on occasion of Republic Day Parade of 1979.

== Operations ==
The regiment has taken part in the following operations –

Indo-Pakistani War of 1971

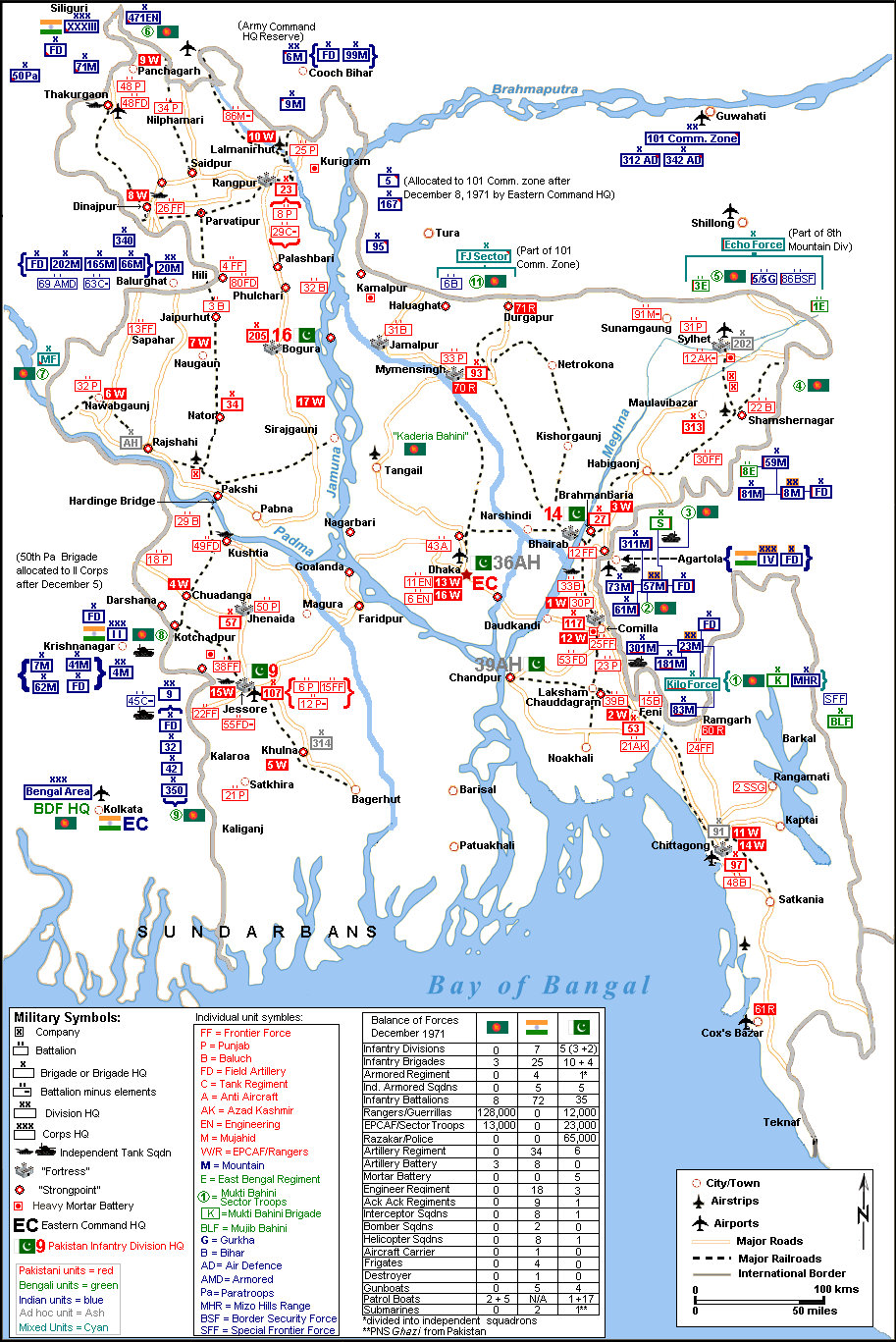
Deployment of troops in the eastern sector during the 1971 war

The regiment was part of 4 Mountain Artillery Brigade of 4 Mountain Division. The division was part of 2 Corps and saw operations in the South Western sector in the Bangladesh Liberation War. It fought at Jibannagar, Uthali, Darshana, Jhenaidah, Kushtia and Hardinge Bridge. The regiment also witnessed the surrender of PakistanI forces after the war. The regiment was awarded two Vir Chakras and two mentioned in dispatches. The names of the fallen soldiers of the regiment forms part of the War Memorial in Ambala Cantonment, the present location of 2 Corps.

Other operations

- Operation Rakshak – The regiment had three tenures of counter insurgency operations, 1995-1996 (Srinagar), 1999-2004 (Poonch) and 2008–2011.
- Operation Vijay – 1999
- Operation Parakram – 2001-2002 – It was actively involved in artillery firing against enemy forces.
- Operation Rakshak – Counter terrorist operations in Jammu and Kashmir between 2008 and 2011.
- Operation Falcon – 2016 - 2019 in Arunachal Pradesh.
- Operation Snow Leopard – 2023 - till date in Ladakh.

== Gallantry awards ==
The regiment has won the following gallantry awards –

- Vir Chakra – 2 (Major Manjit Singh Duggal, Captain Naik Balkrishna Ramachandra)
- Ati Vishisht Seva Medal – 2
- Sena Medal – 1
- Vishisht Seva Medal – 2
- Mentioned in dispatches – 2 (Major Desmond Richard Braganza, Gunner (ORA) Prakash Singh)
- Chief of Army Staff Commendation cards – 7
- General Officer Commanding in Chief Commendation cards – 25
- United Nations Mission Force Commander Commendation card – 1

== Notable Officers ==
- Lieutenant General Ajay Kumar Suri – the Director General, Army Aviation Corps was commissioned into the unit in 1985.
- Major General MS Duggal VrC
- Brigadier BR Naik VrC

== Other achievements ==
The Regiment's performance in sports and professional competitions, has earned it the sobriquet of Champions. Keeping up with the traditions of the regiment, Champions have proved their mettle by winning various Division and Brigade Banners in 1997-97, 2009-10, 2013-14, 2014-15, 2017-18, 2018-19, 2021-22 and 2022-23. In Jan 2011, the regiment completed its 50 years and Golden Jubilee was celebrated by Champions family by creating a Limca Book of Record for the largest cycling rally organised. The achievers include -

- Gunner Vakil Raj Dhendor won a team bronze in archery at the 6th World Military Games at Mungyeong, South Korea in 2015. He also won a team bronze for archery (recurve men) in the 35th National Archery Competition.
- Havildar Sawan Kumar represented the services team in team kata at the National Karate Championship at New Delhi in February 2015.
- Naik L Lima was selected as national taekwondo referee. Awarded GOC-in-C (Western Command) Commendation card in 2023.
- Havildar Pawal Lakra was selected as national hockey player.

== See also ==
- List of artillery regiments of Indian Army
