= Philip Towle =

British academic

- Born: 1945 (age 80–81)
- Citizenship: United Kingdom

Academic background
- Education: Ph.D., King's College, London; M.A., King's College, London; B.A., University of Cambridge

Academic work
- Discipline: International Relations

Philip Towle (born 1945) is a British academic who is emeritus Reader of International Relations at the University of Cambridge. He was formerly director of the Centre for International Studies at the University of Cambridge and served on the United Kingdom's delegations to the Conference of the Committee on Disarmament, the Seabed Treaty Review Conference, and the first UN Special Session on Disarmament. As an undergraduate, he studied at the University of Cambridge, and subsequently received an M.A. and Ph.D. from King's College, London.

== Publications ==
- Towle, Philip (2009). Going to War: British Debates from Wilberforce to Blair. Palgrave Macmillan. ISBN 0230237932.
- Towle, Philip; Jackson, Robert (2006). Temptations of Power: The United States in Global Politics after 9/11. Palgrave Macmillan. ISBN 1403946779.
- Towle, Philip (2006). From Ally to Enemy: Anglo-Japanese Military Relations 1900-1945. Global Oriental. ISBN 1901903680.
- Towle, Philip (2000). Democracy and Peacemaking: Negotiations and Debates 1815-1973. London: Routledge. ISBN 0415214718.
- Towle, Philip (1997). Enforced Disarmament from the Napoleonic Campaigns to the Gulf War. Oxford: Clarendon Press. ISBN 0198206364.
- Towle, Philip (1989). Pilots and Rebels: The Use of Aircraft in Unconventional Warfare. London: Brassey’s. ISBN 0080367127.
- Towle, Philip (1982). Arms Control and East-West Relations. London: Croom Helm. ISBN 0312049455.
- Towle, Philip (1982). Educating the Gunmakers. Shrivenham: Royal Military College of Science.
- Towle, Philip (1979). Naval Power in the Indian Ocean. Canberra: Australian National University. ISBN 0908160283.
