= Chhamb, Hamirpur =

Village in Punjab, India

Chhamb is located in the area of Sujanpur, in the Hamirpur district of the Indian state of Himachal Pradesh. Its population is less than 300 people. Within this village there is also another sub village called Ropri.

This should not be confused with Chamb in J&K district, where military actions occurred during the India Pakistan war of 1971.

== Education ==
The village has a school with 10-15 students. The main school is around 3 km from the village. The villagers are educated.

== Economy ==
The main occupation is agriculture. Some 75% served in the Indian army.
