= Percy Scarlett =

Major-General The Honourable Percy Scarlett CB MC DL
- Born: 10 April 1885; Kensington, London
- Died: 5 October 1957 (aged 72); Kent, England
- Military career
- Allegiance: United Kingdom
- Branch: British Army
- Service years: 1907–1942
- Rank: Major-General
- Service number: 3993
- Unit: Buffs (Royal East Kent Regiment)
- Commands: 4th Indian Infantry Division (1939–1940); Deccan District (1938–1939); 12th Infantry Brigade (1936–1938); 2nd Battalion, Buffs (Royal East Kent Regiment) (1932–1934)
- Conflicts: First World War; Second World War
- Awards: Companion of the Order of the Bath; Military Cross; Mentioned in Despatches; Knight Grand Cross of the Order of the Dannebrog (Denmark)

Major-General Percy Gerald Scarlett, CB, MC, DL (10 April 1885 – 5 October 1957) was a senior British Army officer.

== Early life ==
Scarlett was educated at Wellington College, Berkshire. Three of his brothers succeeded to the Abinger Barony, and in 1904 Scarlett was granted the style and precedence of the younger son of a baron by Royal Warrant.

== Military career ==
Scarlett attended the Royal Military College, Sandhurst, and was commissioned into the Buffs (Royal East Kent Regiment) in 1907. He fought in the First World War, during which he was Mentioned in Despatches and awarded the Military Cross.

After graduating from the Staff College, Camberley, in 1921, Scarlett was promoted to brevet lieutenant colonel. He was in the service of the Shanghai Defence Force from 1927 to 1928. Promoted to brigadier, he served as commander of the 12th Infantry Brigade and Deputy Constable of Dover Castle between 1936 and 1938. Promoted to major general, he was General Officer Commanding the Deccan District in India in 1938. He saw service in the Second World War and was General Officer Commanding the Indian 4th Infantry Division from 1939 to 1940. He became Director of Mobilization in 1940 and was Deputy Adjutant-General between 1940 and 1942. Scarlett was appointed a Companion of the Order of the Bath in 1941, and held the office of Deputy Lieutenant of Kent in 1949. Between 1943 and 1953 he was the Colonel of the Buffs. He was appointed a Knight Grand Cross of the Order of the Dannebrog in 1952.

== Bibliography ==
- Smart, Nick (2005). Biographical Dictionary of British Generals of the Second World War. Barnesley: Pen & Sword. ISBN 1844150496.

Military offices
New command	GOC 4th Indian Infantry Division; 1939–1940	Succeeded by Philip Neame
