= Thomas K. Theogaraj =

Brigadier Thomas Krishnan Theogaraj Maha Vir Chakra
- Born: 2 November 1919; Tirunelveli, Pallam Kotta - Palayamkottai, Madras State, British India
- Died: 14 November 2001 (aged 82)
- Military career
- Allegiance: British Raj; India
- Branch: British Indian Army (1942-1947); Indian Army
- Rank: Brigadier
- Units: 13th D.C.O. Lancers; 2nd Independent Armored Brigade
- Conflicts: World War II; Indo-Pakistani War of 1965
- Awards: Maha Vir Chakra

Brigadier Thomas Krishnan Theogaraj (1919–2001) was a senior officer in the Indian Army. Brigadier Theogaraj commanded the 2nd Independent Armored Brigade and played a key role during the Indo-Pakistani war of 1965. For his role in the war he was awarded the Maha Vir Chakra.

== Early military career ==
He joined the British Indian Army, was selected for officer training and received an emergency commissioned into the Indian Army as a second Lieutenant 1 June 1942. He was appointed a war substantive Lieutenant 1 December 1942, later acting then temporary captain from 18 September 1944. He was posted to the 13th Duke of Connaught's Own Lancers, Indian Armoured Corps.

In April 1941 the 13th D.C.O. Lancers left India for Iraq with the 10th Indian Division. They saw action against the Vichy French in Syria and also served in Persia and Iraq before joining the British Eighth Army in North Africa. In October 1942, they moved back to Persia and then back to India. After the Japanese surrender in 1945, the regiment moved to Java in the Dutch East Indies in support of the 5th and 23rd Indian Divisions, who were engaged in suppressing a revolt by the Indonesians.

For gallant and distinguished services during the operations in Java he received a mention in despatches.

In August 1946 the regiment returned to Secunderabad and on Partition of India in August 1947, the 13th Duke of Connaught's Own Lancers were allotted to the Pakistan Army. At this point he chose to join the Indian Army and went on to receive a regular Indian Army commission. He joined the elite Cavalry Regiment 7th Light Cavalry in 1950. Unfortunately he was posted to another Regiment 62 Cavalry.

== Indo-Pakistani War of 1965 ==
During the Indo-Pakistani War of 1965, Brigadier Thomas Krishnan Theogaraj was the Brigadier commanding the 2nd Independent Armoured Brigade. On 8 September 1965, Pakistan launched a major offensive into the Khem Karan sector of Punjab, led by the 1st Armoured Division, with the strategic objective of capturing Amritsar and advancing towards the bridge over the Beas en route to Jalandhar. In response, the Indian Army initiated Operation Riddle, tasking Brigadier Theogaraj's formation with halting the Pakistani advance.

In the night, the Indian troops flooded the sugar cane field, and the next morning, the Pakistani tanks of the 1st Armoured Division, consisting mainly of M47 and M48 Patton tanks, were lured inside the horse-shoe trap. The swampy ground slowed the advance of the Pakistani tanks and many of them could not move because of the muddy slush. Over 100 Pakistani tanks (mostly Pattons, and a few Shermans and Chaffees) were destroyed, with 40 plus tanks captured by the Indian forces in the ensuing conflict.

== Awards ==
For his courage and leadership displayed during the battle, Brig. Theogaraj was awarded the Maha Vir Chakra, the award being published in the Gazette of India, Part 1, section 1, 12 February 1966.

The citation reads as follows:

Brigadier THOMAS KRISHNAN THEOGARAJ (IC-4321),

The Armoured Corps. (Effective date of award—8th September 1965)

On the 8th September 1965, the Pakistani troops commenced a major thrust in the Khem Karan area. Using Patton Tanks, the enemy attempted encirclement of our troops with the intention of a subsequent deep armoured penetration into our territory. The Armoured Brigade under the command of Brigadier Thomas Krishnan Theogaraj was immediately sent to the area to halt the enemy's advance.

Brigadier Theogaraj effectively deployed his tanks to face the enemy and steadily held his ground against determined enemy attacks. At the end of the battle, over 40 enemy Patton and Chaffee tanks had been destroyed or captured intact and two of the enemy's Patton Regiments were nearly wiped out. The enemy was forced to withdraw with heavy losses and never again attempted to use of tanks in a major thrust against our defences in this sector.

It was due to Brigadier Theogaraj's courage, leadership and determination, that this decisive victory against the enemy’s armour was possible.

— The Gazette of India, Part I, Section 1, dated 1 January 1966,

== Later life ==
He married Sakuntala and had two children: a daughter (born on 19 October 1948), and a son (born on 25 August 1949).

He died on 12 November 2001 at his residence in Madurai, with his last rites being performed in the Tirunelveli district.

== See also ==
- Dewan Ranjit Rai
- Captain Amarinder Singh
