= Patton tank =

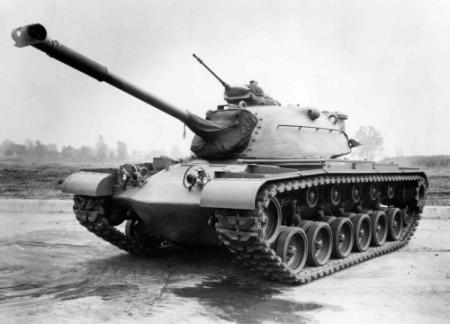
M48A1 Patton tank

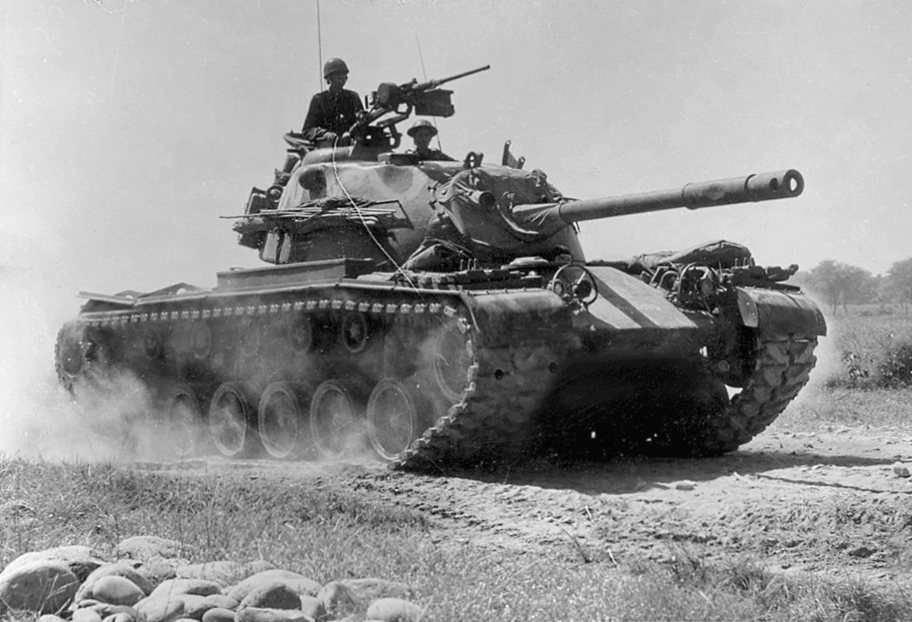
M48 Patton in 1965.

Patton tank may refer to any of a series of tanks used by the United States military from the 1950s to the 1990s, named for General George S. Patton.

Tanks in the series include:

- M46 Patton, a medium tank model operational during the Korean War
- M47 Patton, the first US main battle tank, in service from 1952 through 1959 with the U.S. Army, and through the mid-1990s in foreign service.
- M48 Patton, a tank model in service from the mid-1950s through the Vietnam War with the U.S. Army, and still operational in foreign service.
- M60, the standard main battle tank of the United States from 1960 until it was replaced by the M1 Abrams which entered service in 1980, still extensively used worldwide. Not officially designated a member of the Patton tank family.
