= Khemkaran =

Khem Karan
- Town
- Location in Punjab, India
- Coordinates: 31°08′40″N 74°33′36″E
- Country: India
- State: Punjab
- District: Tarn Taran
- Region of Punjab: Majha

Population (2011)
  - Total: 13,446

Languages
  - Official: Punjabi
- Time zone: UTC+5:30 (IST)
- Postal code: 143419

Khem Karan is a town and a nagar panchayat in Tarn Taran district of Patti tehsil of the Majha region of the Indian state of Punjab.

It was the site of a tank battle in 1965. The Battle of Asal Uttar was the second largest tank battle of the 1965 Indo-Pakistani War. The battle led to the creation of Patton Nagar (or Patton City/Graveyard) at the site of the battle viz, Khem Karan.

== History ==
Khem Karan is an old town. It was visited by Guru Tegh Bahadur (1621–1675). Previously in Lahore District before the partition of British India. It became a part of Amritsar District afterwards.

Many of the town's residents migrated from nearby villages between 1947 and 1965, such as Nathuwala, Qadiwind, Rohiwal, and Sehjra. The town's Muslim residents migrated primarily to the city of Kasur, 8 km away in Pakistan.

The town used to be accessible to the city of Kasur, Pakistan 8 km away, and to Ferozepur 35 km away until India and Pakistan enacted border controls in 1953 and further restricted travel in 1965. The residents of Khem Karan were essentially cut off from both towns - Kasur lies in Pakistan, while the road to Ferozepur cuts through Pakistan, creating a 70 kilometre detour.

=== India-Pakistan war of 1965 ===
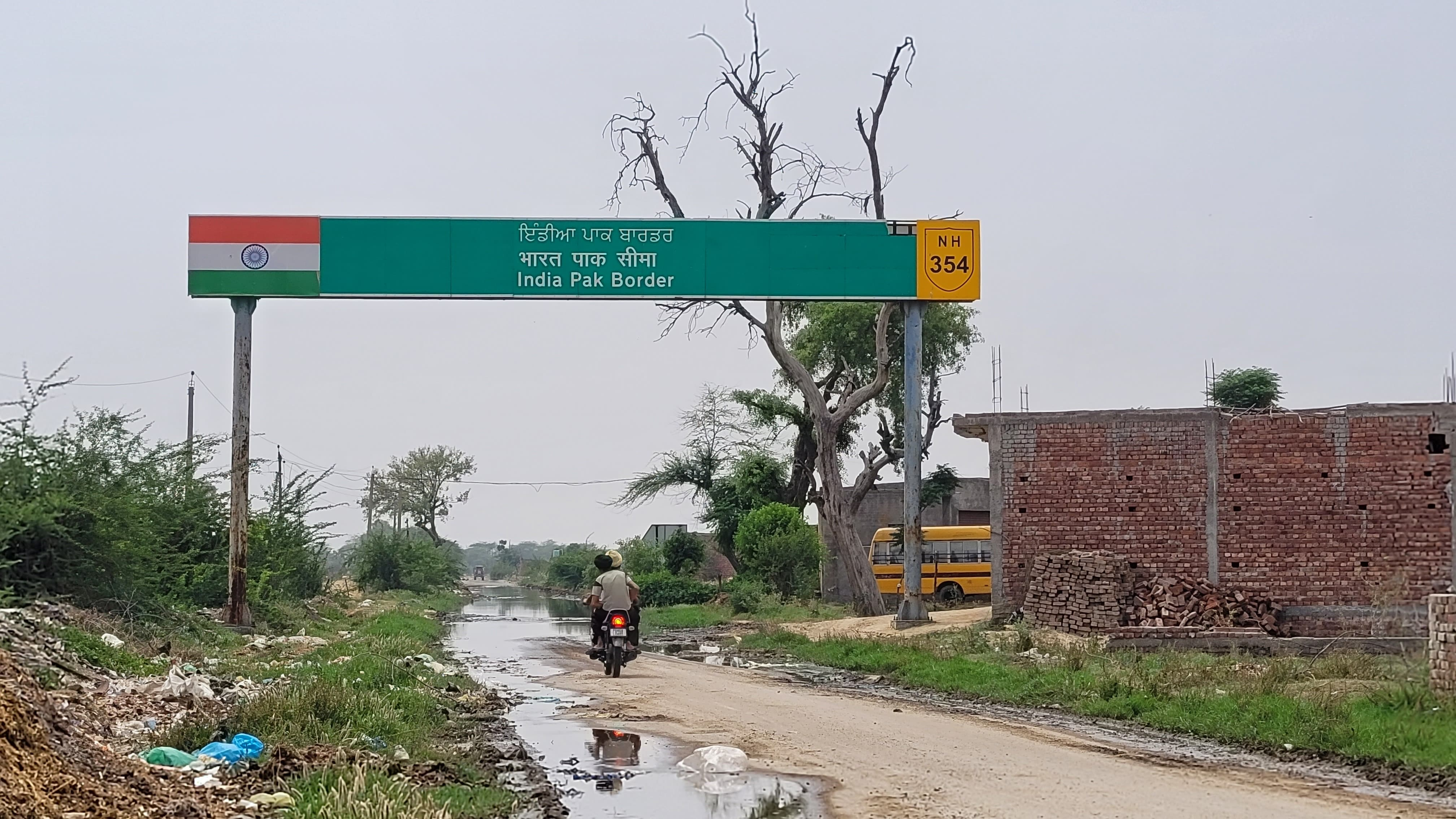
Indo Pak Border at village Khemkaran

On 8 September, the Pakistani 1st Armoured Division and 11 Infantry Division under the command of Maj Gen Nasir Khan pushed an offensive towards Khem Karan, with the intent to capture Amritsar (a major city in Punjab, India) and the bridge on River Beas to Jalandhar. India then launched a counter-offensive. After India breached the Madhupur canal on 11 September, the Khem Karan counter-offensive was halted, affecting Pakistan's strategy substantially. The Pakistani forces engaged with a far advanced and much numbered Indian force comprising only the 2nd Independent Armoured Brigade commanded by Brig Thomas K. Theogaraj, who formed a defensive horseshoe formation to counter the Pakistani force. But, Khem Karan was captured at last by Pakistan completely.

== Demographics ==
As of 2011 India census, Khem Karan had a population of 13,446. Males constituted 55% and females 45%. Khem Karan has an average literacy rate of 61.55%, lower than the state average of 75.84%: male literacy is 67%, and female literacy is 54.85%. In Khem Karan, 12.14% of the population is under 6 years of age.

The table below shows the population of different religious groups in Khem Karan town and their gender ratio, as of 2011 census.

Population by religious groups in Khem Karan town, 2011 census
Religion	Total	Female	Male	Gender ratio
Sikh	9,103	4,276	4,827	885
Hindu	3,397	1,355	2,042	663
Christian	795	375	420	892
Muslim	73	19	54	351
Buddhist	4	0	4	--
Jain	2	0	2	--
Other religions	1	0	1	--
Not stated	71	31	40	775
Total	13,446	6,056	7,390	819

== Geography ==
Khem Karan village is located 56 km southwest of Tarn Taran Sahib city in Tarn Taran district, 60 south of Amritsar, and 55 km north of Firozpur city.

== Politics ==
The city is part of the Khemkaran South Assembly Constituency.

== Tourism ==
Throughout the year, people visit the Martyr's monument to honor the memory of the Indian Army's martyrs of 1965 India-Pakistan Battle of Asal Uttar. The annual memorial event play the sports competition is also held here in September.

In this village is the mausoleum (mazaar) of Sufi saint known as Pir Baba Sheikh Brahm. Twice in a year a fair (mela) is held there.

== Transport ==
Air:

Sri Guru Ram Das Ji International Airport at Amritsar is 75 km to the north of Khemkaran.

Rail:

Khem Karan is a railway station on the Amritsar-Patti-Khem Karan line, which is being extended from Patti to Mallanwala Khas as an additional direct link from Amritsar and Khemkaran to Firozpur and Rajasthan via the under-construction 1,369 metres (4,491 ft) long rail-cum-road bridge on Sutlej River.

Road:

NH354 connects Khemkaran to Amritsar, Dera Baba Nanak and Gurdaspur to the north as well as to Firozpur and Malout in the south.

== Economy ==
Khemkaran is mostly an agricultural village.

== Gallery ==
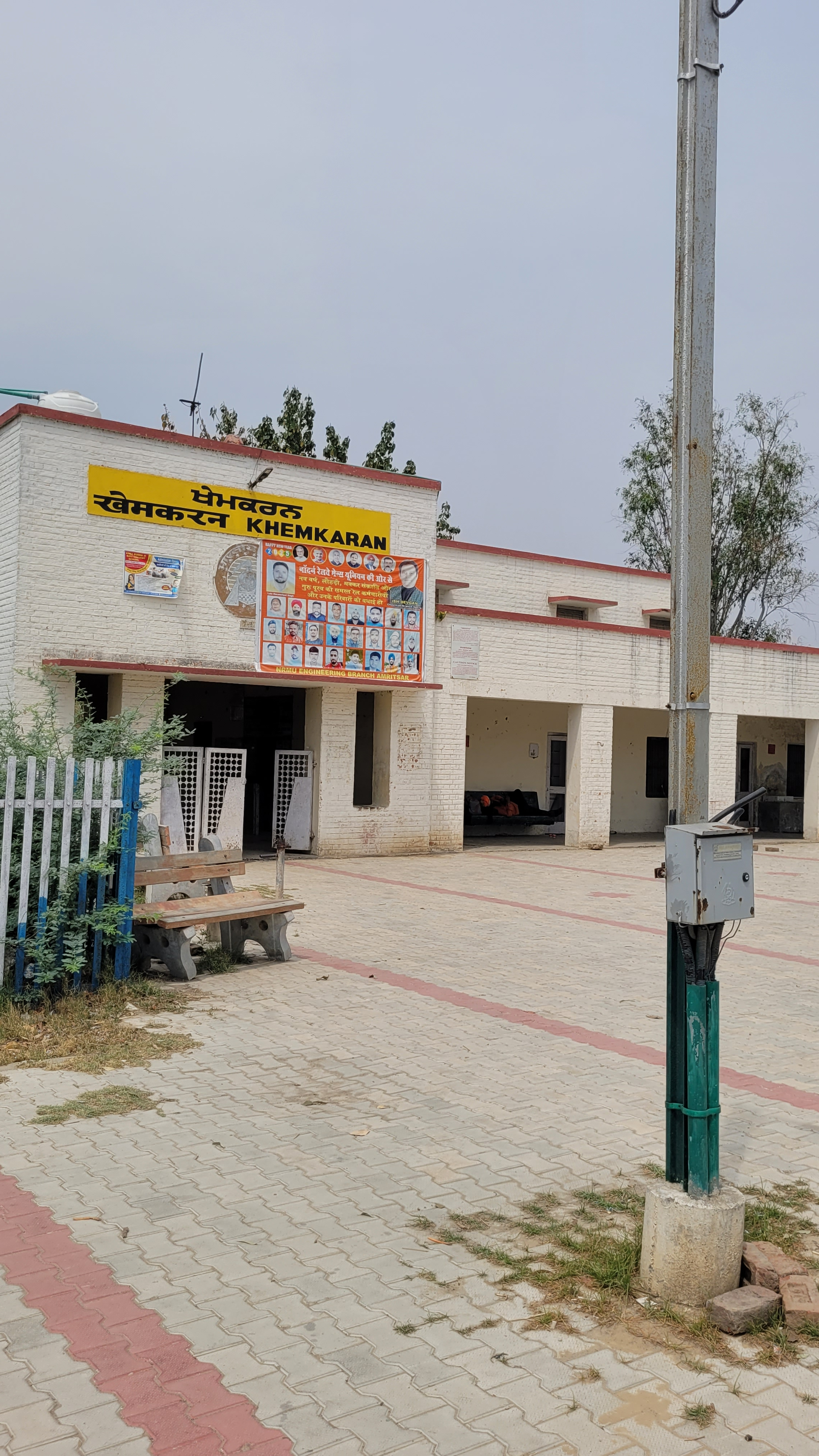
Khem Karan Railway Station, Punjab

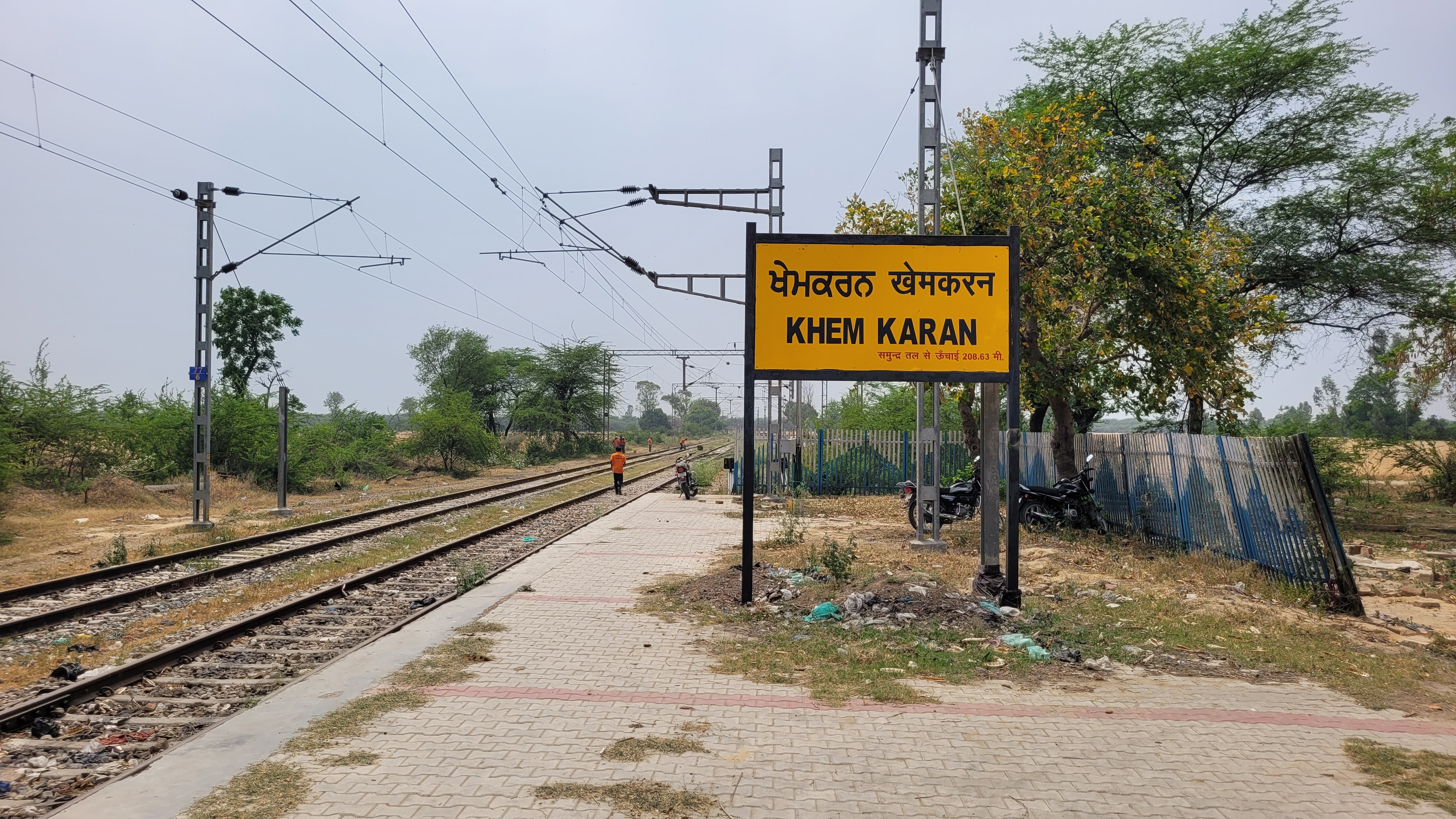
Khem Karan Railway Station

== Notable people ==
- Deepak Dhawan
- Mehtab Singh
- Baba Amar Singh Nibber

== See also ==
- Bhikhiwind
- Attari–Wagah border ceremony
