= Animal attack =

Violent attacks caused by non-human animals against humans

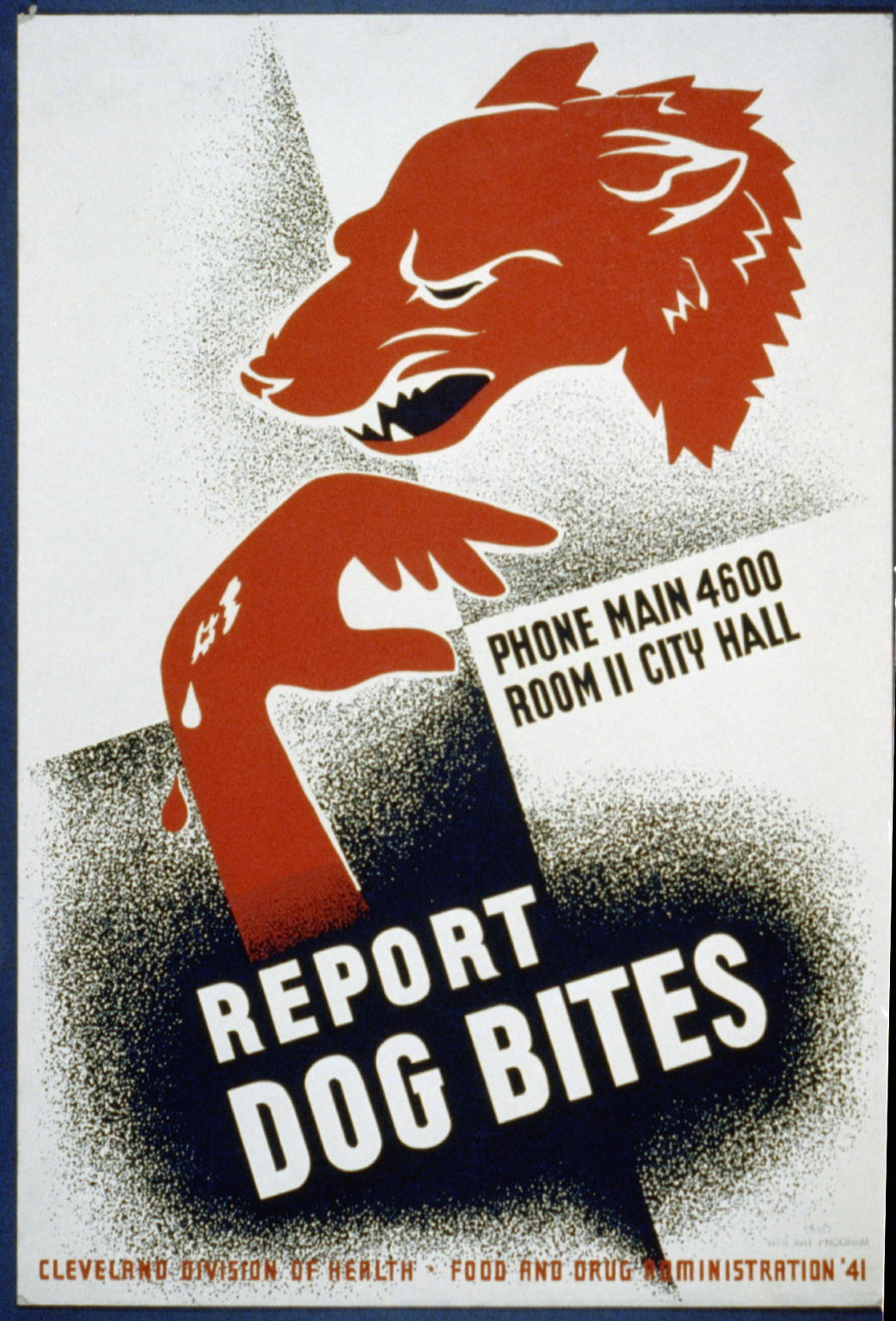
1941 poster for the Cleveland Division of Health encouraging dog bite victims to report dog bites to the proper authorities

Animal attacks are violent attacks caused by non-human animals against humans, one of the most common being bites. These attacks are a cause of human injuries and fatalities worldwide. According to the 2012 U.S. Pet Ownership & Demographics Sourcebook, 56% of United States citizens owned a pet. In the United States in 1994, approximately 4.7 million people were bitten by dogs. The frequency of animal attacks varies with geographical location, as well as hormonal secretion. Gonad glands found on the anterior side of the pituitary gland secrete androgen and estrogen hormones. Animals with high levels of these hormones, which depending on the species can be a seasonal occurrence, such as during rutting season, tend to be more aggressive, which leads to a higher frequency of attacks not only to humans but among themselves. In the United States, a person is more likely to be killed by a domesticated dog than they are to die from being hit by lightning according to the National Safety Council.

Animal attacks have been identified as a major public health problem. In 1997, it was estimated that up to 2 million animal bites occur each year in the United States. Injuries caused by animal attacks result in thousands of fatalities worldwide every year. "Unprovoked attacks occur when the animal approaches and attacks a person(s) who is the principal attractant, for example, predation on humans ..." All causes of death are reported to the Centers for Disease Control and Prevention each year. Medical injury codes are used to identify specific cases. The World Health Organization uses identical coding, though it is unclear whether all countries keep track of animal-related fatalities. Though animals, excluding some tigers, do not regularly hunt humans, there is concern that these incidents are "bad for many species 'public image'."

== Epidemiology and injuries ==
Animal bites are the most common form of injury from animal attacks. The U.S. estimated annual count of animal bites is 250,000 human bites, 1 to 2 million dog bites, 400,000 cat bites, and 45,000 bites from snakes. Bites from skunks, horses, squirrels, rats, rabbits, pigs, and monkeys may be up to one percent of bite injuries. Unprovoked pet ferret attacks have caused serious facial injuries. Non-domesticated animals, although often assumed to be more common, especially as a cause of rabies infection, make up less than one percent of reported bite wounds. Bites to the right arm are the most likely due to defensive reactions when the victim uses their dominant arm. The most common location for fatal bites is on the individual's head. It is estimated that three-quarters of bites to humans are to the arms or legs. Bites to the face constitute only ten percent of total bites. Children aged ten and younger suffer two-thirds of reported bite injuries. Bite injuries are often the result of an animal attack, including instances when a human attacks another human. Human bites are the third most frequent type of bite after dog and cat bites. Dog bites are commonplace, with children the most frequently bitten and the face and scalp the most common targets.

== Infections ==
Animal bites carry an increased risk of infection due to their exposure to rabies and different bacteria that animals have in their oral cavity. Microbiological studies are carried out to determine some of these infections. Frequently these infections are polymicrobial with different mixtures of aerobic and anaerobic microorganisms. Some of the bacteria identified by the remains that are maintained in the bites and by exposure to other variables and change of physical environment are: Pasturella spp., Streptococcus, Staphylococcus, Moraxella, Corynebacterium, Neisseria, Fusobacterium, Bacteroides, Posphuomonoa, Capnocytophaga canimorsus, and Prevotella.

== Treatments ==
Treatment for those who have been attacked depends on the injuries. Though trauma may be addressed first, subsequent infections are also treated with appropriate antibiotics. The use of prophylactic antibiotics can significantly reduce the risk of a serious infection in the lesion. It is important to visit a doctor if the bite is severe. Up to three-quarters of dog bites happen to those younger than 20 years old. In the United States, the costs associated with dog bites are estimated at over $1 billion annually. The age groups that suffer most from dog bites are children 5 to 9 years old. Often bites go unreported and receive no medical treatment. Up to one percent of pediatric emergency room visits are for animal bites. This is more frequent during the summer months. Up to five percent of children receiving emergency care for dog bites are hospitalized. Bites typically occur in the late afternoon and early evening. Girls are bitten more frequently by cats than by dogs, while boys are bitten by dogs two times more often than are girls. To prevent serious and even fatal infections, rabies vaccines for both humans and non-human animals are recommended, even if the person is not directly exposed to the infection. In addition, it is essential to know and consider the probability of transmission, the animal that caused the bite, the type and severity of the injury, and the age and overall health of the victim. In 1936, amputation was required in a third of cases in which treatment was delayed for 24 hours or longer.

== Medical codes for animal attacks ==
Injuries resulting from encounters with animals occur with sufficient frequency to require the use of medical codes by clinicians and insurance companies to document such encounters. The ICD-10-CM Diagnosis Codes are used for the purpose of clearly identifying diseases, their causes, injuries in the United States. Clinicians use these codes to quantify the medical condition and its causes and to bill insurance companies for the treatment required as a result of encounters with animals.

| Code | Description |
|---|---|
| W53 | Contact with rodent |
| W54 | Contact with dog |
| W55 | Contact with other mammals |
| W56 | Contact with non-venomous marine animal |
| W57 | Bitten or stung by non-venomous insect and other non-venomous arthropods |
| W58 | Contact with crocodile or alligator |
| W59 | Contact with other non-venomous reptiles |
| W61 | Contact with birds (domestic) (wild) |
| W62 | Contact with non-venomous amphibians |

== Notable deaths ==
| Year | Name | Age | Details |
|---|---|---|---|
| c. 1000 BC | Parikshit | unknown | Bit by a snake |
| 519 | Conleth | ~60 years | Killed by wolves |
| 912 | Oleg the Wise | unknown | Bit by a snake |
| c. 1500 | Lakṣmīpriyā | 48 years | Bit by a snake |
| 1528 | Tenali Rama | 47 years | Bit by a snake |
| 1582 | Residents of Pskov | various | A number of crocodiles escaped from captivity to a local river, then reportedly attacked and devoured many city residents |
| 1787 | Two-Headed Boy of Bengal | 4 years | Bit by a snake |
| 1852 | Crew members of HMS Birkenhead | various | Hundreds of sharks attacked sinking ship sailors. A few hundred men were killed |
| 1898 | Residents of Tsavo | various | A pair of lions attacked rail workers' camps for months. Killed 30-125 men |
| 1913 | Carl Hagenbeck | 57 years | Bit by a snake |
| 1920 | King Alexander of Greece | 27 years | Monkey bite |
| 1932 | Bill Pickett | 61 years | Killed by a horse kick |
| 1942 | Crew members of the USS Juneau | various | Sharks attacked sinking ship sailors, including remaining Sullivan brothers |
| 1945 | Crew members of the USS Indianapolis | various | Hundreds of sharks attacked sinking ship sailors. A few dozen to 150 men were killed |
| 1945 | Japanese soldiers at the Battle of Ramree Island | various | Number of saltwater crocodiles attacked retreating Japanese soldiers. A few to hundreds were killed |
| 1948 | Grace Olive Wiley | 65 years | Bitten by a snake |
| 1950 | Kevin Budden | 20 years | Bitten by a taipan snake |
| 1955 | George Hensley | 74 years | Bit by a snake |
| 1957 | Karl Patterson Schmidt | 67 years | Bit by a snake |
| 1975 | Robert Mertens | 81 years | Bit by a snake |
| 1980 | Azaria Chamberlain | 2 months | Attacked by a dingo |
| 1982 | Jean Batten | 73 years | Infection from a dog bite |
| 1993 | John Pickard | 80 years | Killed by a bull on his family farm |
| 1994 | Allen Campbell | 37 years | Crushed by circus elephant Tyke |
| 1994 | Rick Lomba | 44 years | Attacked by Bengal Tiger |
| 2001 | Joseph Bruno Slowinski | 38 years | Bitten by a Suzhen's krait |
| 2001 | Diane Whipple | 33 years | Attacked by 2 dogs |
| 2001 | Jacky Boxberger | 51 years | Attacked by an elephant on a safari |
| 2003 | Timothy Treadwell | 46 years | Devoured by a bear |
| 2003 | Vitaly Nikolayenko | 65 years | Mauled by a bear |
| 2004 | Boonreung Buachan | 35 years | Bit by a cobra during a show |
| 2005 | Kenton Joel Carnegie | 22 years | Killed by wolves |
| 2006 | Richard Root | 68 years | Killed by a crocodile |
| 2006 | Steve Irwin | 44 years | Killed by a stingray during a diving expedition |
| 2006 | Ali Khan Samsudin | 48 years | Bitten by a king cobra |
| 2007 | Surinder Singh Bajwa | 44 years | Attacked by a group of rhesus macaques at his home and fell from a first-floor balcony |
| 2008 | Stephan Miller | 39 years | Killed by a bear while making a promotional video |
| 2009 | Alexis Martínez | 29 years | Killed by an orca (named Keto) in an aquarium |
| 2009 | Taylor Mitchell | 19 years | Coyote attack |
| 2010 | Dawn Brancheau | 40 years | Killed by orca Tilikum |
| 2011 | Horatio Chapple | 17 years | Killed by a polar bear on an Arctic expedition |
| 2011 | Mathieu Schiller | 32 years | Killed by a shark |
| 2013 | Noah and Connor Barthe | 4 & 6 years | Strangled by a friend's father's pet African rock python |
| 2014 | Jamie Coots | 42 years | Bit by a rattlesnake |
| 2015 | Katherine Chappell | 29 years | Killed by a lioness while visiting a park |
| 2017 | Akbar Salubiro | 25 years | Killed and swallowed by a reticulated python |

== See also ==
- Animal resistance
- 2010 Sharm el-Sheikh shark attacks
- 2013 New Brunswick python attack
- CrocBITE
- Fatal dog attacks in the United States
- Jersey Shore shark attacks of 1916
- Kali River goonch attacks
- Kenton Joel Carnegie wolf attack
- List of deadliest animals to humans
- Man-eating animal
- St. James Davis Chimpanzee Attack
- Porphyrios (whale), a whale that killed Roman Sailors for half a century.
