= Animal resistance =

Resistance by animals to human activities

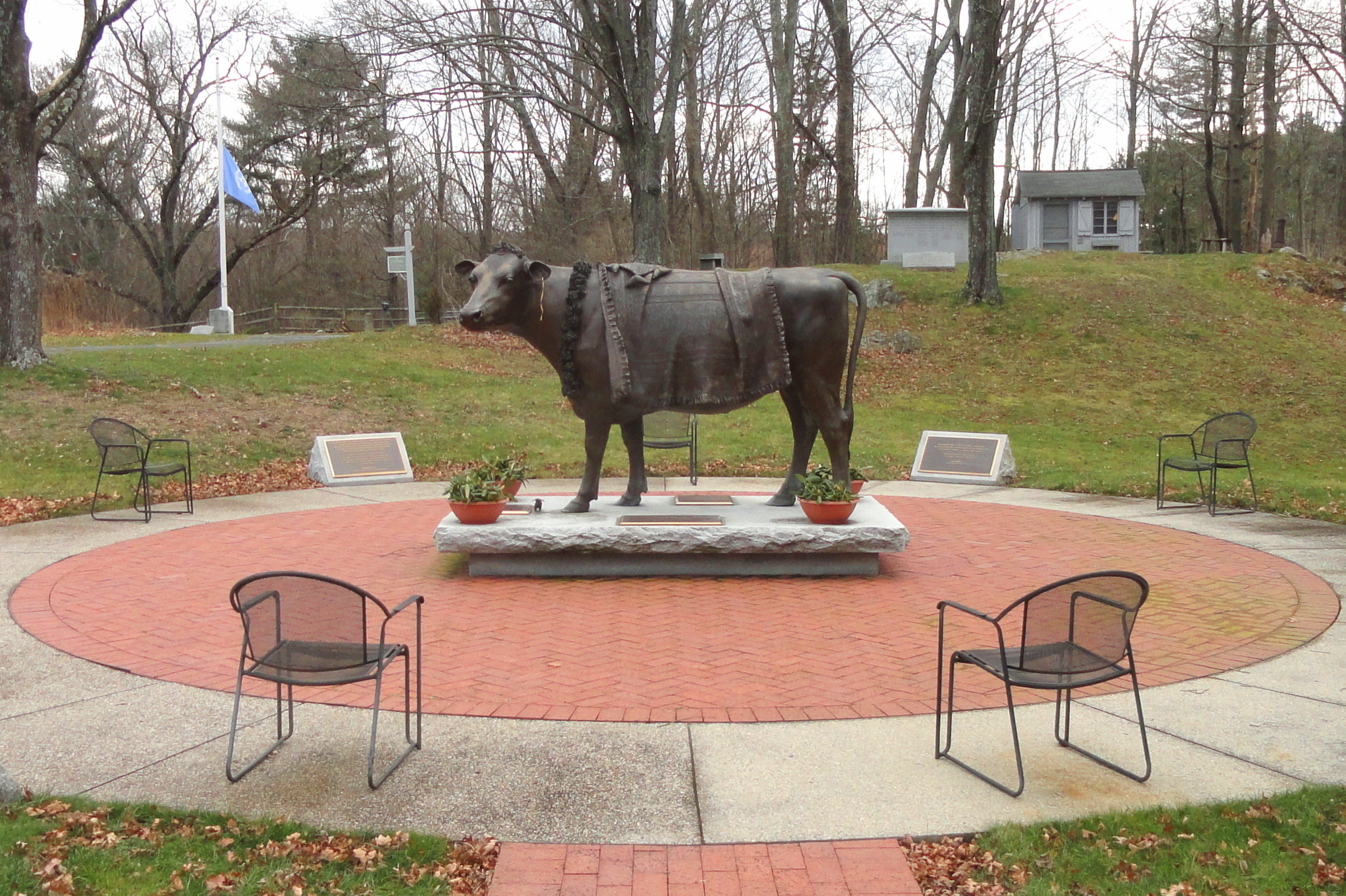
Memorial for the cow Emily who escaped from a slaughterhouse in Massachusetts in 1995

Animal resistance refers to acts by non-human animals that oppose, evade, or defy human control, exploitation, or confinement. Such behaviors range from escape attempts and refusal to cooperate to direct physical confrontation. The concept has become a subject of study in fields such as political philosophy, animal studies, ethology and critical international relations, where scholars examine how these acts challenge human-centered understandings of politics, ethics, and power.

== Conceptual framework ==
Within academic literature, animal resistance is primarily analyzed as a challenge to anthropocentrism, prompting a shift from viewing animals as passive resources to recognizing their agency. Scholars generally agree that these behaviors constitute a meaningful intervention into established human-animal power dynamics, often framing them as a form of politics.

A central approach frames animal resistance within histories of labor and exploitation. Historians such as Jason Hribal and Violette Pouillard document how animals in circuses, zoos, and farms have historically contested their conditions, arguing their actions have sometimes influenced reforms in treatment. They advocate for a relational and empirical definition of animal resistance, focusing on actions that disrupt human control and provoke institutional responses, whether or not intent can be proven. This perspective is extended by political theorists such as Tim Reijsoo, Fahim Amir, Geoffrey Whitehall and Dinesh Wadiwel, who posit that the act of resisting domination is inherently political. They contend that animal resistance undermines both the material control and the socially constructed categories, like "livestock" or "zoo animal," that justify their exploitation.

== Motivations for resistance ==
The interpretation of behaviors labeled as animal resistance is subject to scholarly debate. Some scientists and philosophers caution against anthropomorphism, arguing that such acts may be instinctual reactions to stress or environmental stimuli rather than evidence of conscious intent. Some, like Jason Hribal, argue that animals like orcas and elephants target specific oppressors knowingly. Others, like Chris Wilbert, suggest animals can act intentionally without reflective thought. Ethological studies of orangutans, for instance, show they may plan escapes systematically, supporting hypotheses of premeditation in certain species.

Other scholars contend that resistance does not require human-like cognition to be significant, noting that many animals possess the neurological capacity for intentional states. From this perspective, the observable, goal-directed nature of actions to alter oppressive circumstances is central. Geoffrey Whitehall argues that debating whether animals intend to resist misses the point contends that "resistance is enough". According to him, the act itself disrupts human systems and demands recognition, regardless of motive. From this view, animal resistance is less a plea for inclusion in human ethics and more a "declaration of war" against human domination.

Reported motivations and contexts for resistant behaviors include, according to scholar Sarat Colling:

- Self-preservation: Acts interpreted as defense against immediate threats or sustained deprivation. Examples include orcas injuring trainers in captivity (see: Orca attacks), wild boars evading hunters with tactical maneuvers, and gorillas collaboratively dismantling poachers' snares.
- Social bonds: Actions ostensibly driven by affiliation, such as mother cows seeking separated calves or animals refusing to abandon social groups.
- Retaliatory aggression: Targeted attacks on specific humans following prior abuse, documented in cases involving large carnivores like tigers.
- Environmental deprivation: Escape attempts or repetitive behaviors by captive animals, such as orangutans, in environments deemed to lack adequate mental stimulation.
- Avoidance of harm: Desperate escape attempts by animals facing slaughter, cited as a fundamental drive for survival.

== Forms of resistance ==
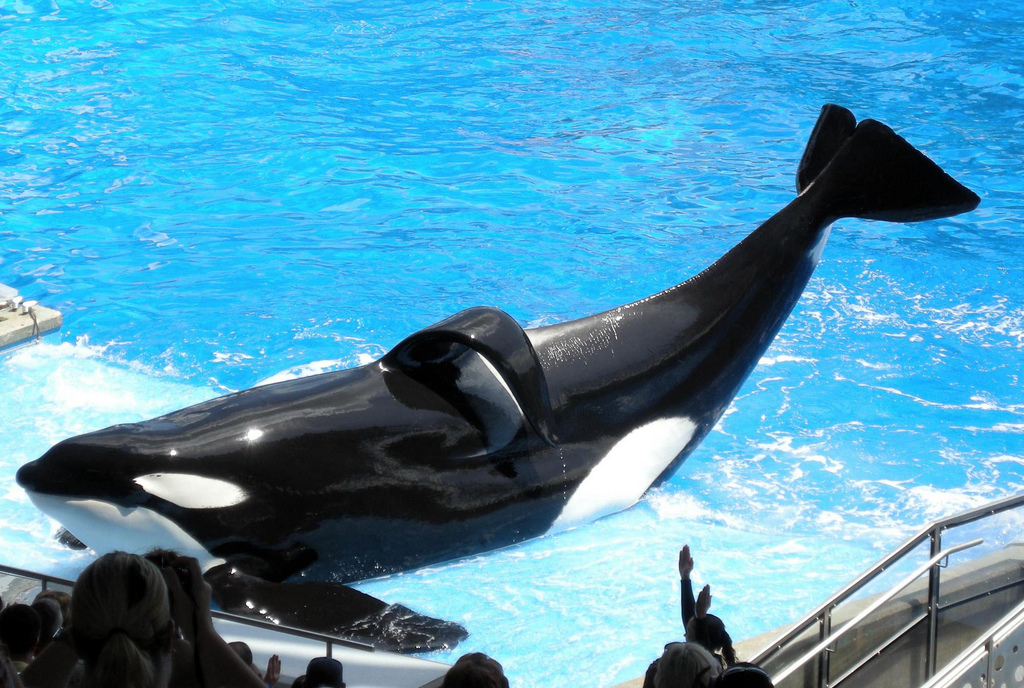
Tilikum was a captive orca known for fatal attacks against trainers at animal theme parks

Sarat Colling categorizes observed acts of animal resistance into several forms, ranging from direct confrontations to subtle, ongoing non-compliance:

- Escape is the most direct form, involving attempts to leave confinement. Documented cases range from solitary, ingenious efforts such as octopuses navigating drainpipes or orangutans picking locks to coordinated mass breakouts by social animals like primates. These acts often involve problem-solving and, in social species, cooperation.
- Aiding others encompasses actions interpreted as freeing fellow captives or defending group members. Examples include dogs unlocking kennels for others, sperm whales attacking whaling ships after pod members are harpooned, and goats reportedly facilitating group escapes. This form suggests motivations extending beyond self-interest.
- Direct retaliation involves attacks on handlers or captors, frequently documented in animals subjected to sustained abuse or performance demands, such as elephants in circuses and orcas in marine parks. These are often interpreted as defensive or defiant responses to immediate threats or prolonged oppression.
- Non-compliance and sabotage represent everyday, low-intensity resistance. This includes animals refusing to perform trained behaviors (e.g., racehorses balking), damaging equipment, or engaging in passive resistance like ignoring commands. Such acts are seen as a persistent rejection of assigned roles and exploitative conditions.

In captive environments, animals may develop stereotypic behaviors, repetitive, functionless actions such as pacing, rocking, or self-harm. Ethologists link these to frustration, stress, or thwarted natural behaviors. Historian Violette Pouillard argues that such behaviors constitute a form of “silent resistance”, a response to oppressive conditions when direct defiance is suppressed.

== Human responses ==
Industries that exploit animals often recast resistance. Zoos, circuses, and agricultural operations may publicly attribute escapes or attacks to "instinct" or accident, a framing scholars argue dismisses animal agency to maintain a perception of normalcy and safety. Scholar Tim Reijsoo describes a posture of "human innocence," a form of willful ignorance that maintains human privilege by overlooking animal agency.

Typical institutional responses include strengthening containment, relocating animals, or increased behavioral conditioning. Industrial farming seeks to minimize opposition by shaping animal biology and behavior for docility and productivity. Temple Grandin's work on reducing stress in slaughterhouses is cited as an example of a biopolitical strategy that addresses animal resistance to create more efficient systems, an approach Whitehall describes as turning "animal resistance against animals." According to Geoffrey Whitehall, the systematic breeding of such docility means a lack of overt resistance cannot be interpreted as consent.

In wildlife management, behaviors labeled as "pest" or "invasive" such as wolves predating livestock are typically governed through state-sanctioned culling, hunting quotas, and legal frameworks that pathologize resistance as human-wildlife "conflict" rather than political agency.

When public sympathy leads to an animal sanctuary for an individual "exceptional" animal, scholars note this often leaves the systemic conditions unchallenged, a dynamic compared to selective humanitarianism in refugee discourse.

Some theorists, like Sue Donaldson and Will Kymlicka, argue for extending models of citizenship to domesticated animals and sovereignty to wild animals, viewing resistance as a catalyst for building an inclusive interspecies polity ("zoopolis"). Geoffrey Whitehall cautions that such inclusion may co-opt resistance into human frameworks. He suggests the core political question is not how to include animals in human systems, but how to acknowledge their separate "non-human politics."

== See also ==
- Animal attack
- Animal rights
- Animal trial
- Human–wildlife conflict
