= Kan'ichi =

- Gender: Male

Origin
- Origin: Japanese
- Meaning: Different meanings depending on the kanji used

Kan'ichi or Kanichi (written: 貫一, 皖一, 寛一 or 寛市) is a masculine Japanese given name. Notable people with the name include:

- Kan'ichi Asakawa (朝河 貫一; 1873–1948), Japanese historian
- Kan'ichi Gondo (権藤 貫一; 1845–1915), Japanese politician
- Kanichi Kashimura (樫村 寛一; 1913–1943), Imperial Japanese Navy officer
- Kanichi Nagazawa (長沢 寛一; 1891–1981), Japanese Major General
- Kanichi Kurita (栗田 貫一; born 1958), Japanese voice actor and comedian
- Kan'ichi Kuroda (黒田 寛一; 1927–2006), Japanese philosopher
- Kan'ichi Oda (小田 貫一; 1856–1909), Japanese politician
- Kan'ichi Shimofusa (下総 皖一; 1898 1962), Japanese composer
- Tsunenohana Kan'ichi (常ノ花 寛市; 1896–1960), Japanese sumo wrestler
- Kanichi Yamamoto (1879–1961), Japanese Bahá'í
