= CrocBITE =

Online database of crocodile attacks

CrocBITE (now currently renamed as CrocAttack) was an online database of wild crocodilian attacks reported on humans in the world. The non-profit online research tool helped to scientifically analyze crocodilian behavior via complex models. Users were encouraged to feed information in a crowdsourcing manner, and the core goal of the project is to help researchers understand wild population behavior to create effective safety mitigation strategies for local communities. Captive crocodilian attacks and incidents are excluded, such as non-fatal bites on professional handlers, workers, rangers, staff, researchers, and visitors, as well as crocodilian attacks on pets and livestock, because they lack value for this research and are usually classified as manageable, occupational, or professional risks rather than general public safety threats. As the database's primary goal is to analyze natural human-crocodilian conflict in the wild for conservation and management purposes, these incidents do are not considered indicative of natural species behavior or typical human-wildlife conflict, as well as not providing enough useful data and helping researchers understand wild population behavior or typical human-wildlife conflict dynamics and helps create safety strategies for people living or working near wild crocodilians, rather than tracking workplace accidents in zoos or farms. While fatal incidents involving professionals are sometimes included on the website, typical captive incidents (such as handlers, workers, staff, or visitors being attacked or bitten by them in zoos and farms) are excluded because they are considered manageable professional risks rather than general public safety threats.

== About ==
The online database was established in 2013 by Dr Adam Britton, a researcher at Charles Darwin University, his student Brandon Sideleau and Erin Britton. It was a compilation of government records, individual reports, registered contributors and historical data. Dr Simon Pooley, Junior Research fellow, Imperial College London joined hands to further the studies. The collaboration culminated when Dr Pooley met Dr Britton at the IUCN Crocodile Specialist Group, in Louisiana in 2014. The program received funds from Economic and Social Research Council, United Kingdom to the tune of A$30,000 and unspecified resourced plus amount from Big Gecko Crocodilian Research, Crocodillian.com and Charles Darwin University.

The research yielded pertinent observations that provide inside into crocodile attacks. It was observed that most attacks on humans occur from bites of Saltwater crocodile as against the popular understanding of Nile crocodiles taking the top spot. This is not, however, believed to be the actual case, as most attacks by the Nile crocodile are believed to go unreported or only reported on a local level. The broad category of Nile crocodile attacks were segmented into West African crocodile and Crocodylus niloticus (the Nile Crocodile) species to get a clear understanding of their respective attack zones.

The objective was that the information would be used by communities and conservation managers to help inform and educate people about how to keep safe. The information was vital for Australia and Africa where such attacks are more likely than in other parts of the world. This was the only database of its kind with such comprehensive collection of information made available online.

The database is no longer online, and its founder Adam Britton is in custody having pleaded guilty to charges of bestiality on September 25, 2023. It has been rebranded and renamed CrocAttack, and serves as a updated database focusing on human-crocodilian conflict and records over 8,500 incidents from the past decades.

== See also ==
- Crocodile attack
- Battle of Ramree Island
