= 2013 New Brunswick python attack =

Killing of two boys by an African rock python

- Date: August 5, 2013
- Location: Campbellton, New Brunswick, Canada
- Type: Deaths caused by an animal (African rock python)
- Deaths: 2
- Accused: 1
- Convicted: 0
- Charges: Criminal negligence
- Trial: Jury trial
- Verdict: Acquittal

On August 5, 2013, an African rock python killed two boys in Campbellton, New Brunswick, Canada. The boys, brothers Noah and Connor Barthe, aged 4 and 6 respectively, were sleeping in an apartment above their friend's father's pet store. The python – which had been in a specially made enclosure in the apartment – had escaped, crawled through an air duct, and fallen through a ceiling tile above where the boys were sleeping. Following the incident, the python was euthanized. The python's owner was charged with criminal negligence for not preventing the deaths but was found not guilty in a jury trial in November 2016.

== Prior incidents ==
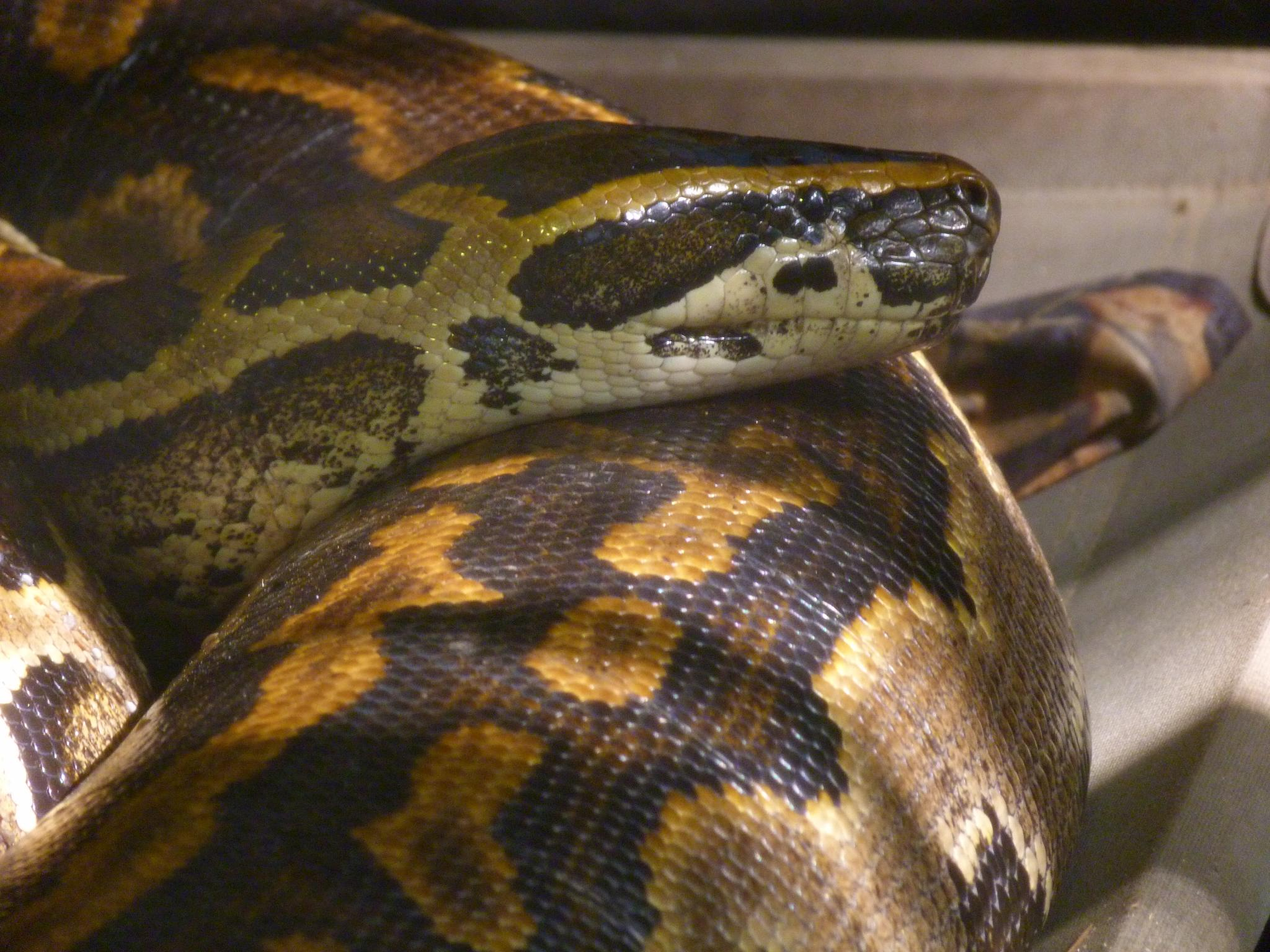
An African rock python

The African rock python is one of the five largest snake species in the world (along with the green anaconda, reticulated python, Burmese python and amethystine python). At least two other examples of humans killed by an African rock python have been reported. A ten-year-old boy was reportedly killed and swallowed in South Africa in 2002, and a three-year-old boy was reportedly strangled by an African rock python in Centralia, Illinois, U.S., in 1999. In another Canadian incident, a closely related species, a Burmese python, reportedly strangled a 28-year-old Brampton man in 1992.

== Event ==
The Royal Canadian Mounted Police (RCMP) said the python escaped from its enclosure in the apartment via the ventilation system and entered the living room where the boys were sleeping. The python was approximately 4.3 metres (14 ft) long and weighed 45 kilograms (100 lb). The boys, Noah Barthe, 4, and Connor Barthe, 6, were brothers who were visiting their friend, whose father owned a pet shop below the apartment where they were staying.

The owner of the python – Jean-Claude Savoie – was interviewed by the Canadian network Global TV. According to the interview, the python was not in the pet store downstairs, but rather in a specially-built cage in the apartment upstairs. The python escaped from its enclosure through a hole in the ceiling, where a ventilation fan had been removed for maintenance. This gave the snake direct access to the air ducts in the ceiling, which then collapsed under the snake's weight above the living room. The air duct containing the snake crashed through the ceiling tiles and onto the boys, who were sleeping on a floor mattress located about 2.4 metres (8 ft) from the snake's enclosure. A pathologist determined the cause of death to be the result of "asphyxiation by neck strangulation", after the snake coiled itself around the brothers. Both boys also suffered multiple wounds from repeated bites.

== Controversy ==
Several experts expressed skepticism about the incident and said that such behaviour by this type of snake would be extremely unusual, although there have been some previous reports of deadly attacks on humans. According to the reports, the snake did not consume the bodies after strangling the brothers. This – together with the fact that more than one child was killed in a single incident and that the other occupants of the apartment were reportedly not awakened by the disturbance – prompted questions about the circumstances regarding the alleged attack. Lee Parker, facilities manager at Reptilia, Canada's largest indoor reptile zoo, stated that these snakes do not "go on killing sprees. It doesn't make sense to me." Though these objections were made, the possibility that the incident may be a homicide rather than an animal attack was ruled out by the RCMP.

Court records revealed that police who first arrived on the scene found the pet shop owner pacing outside of the store with blood on his hands and wearing shorts. The store owner told arriving police that the snake was still unaccounted for.

Kentucky Reptile Zoo director Jim Harrison stated that it was theoretically possible for the large python to have constricted around both boys at the same time, a theory supported by Neil Ford, a professor at the University of Texas. Harrison also said that since the boys handled a variety of farm animals (horses, llamas, goats, cats and dogs) earlier that day, they may have smelled like food to the snake.

Although the pet shop was registered as a reptile zoo, police said that the province does not allow pythons over 3 metres and the African rock python is a prohibited species and that the owner probably did not have the proper permits and authorization to keep the python under his care.

== Aftermath ==
The python was euthanized by authorities. Additionally, a total of 23 reptiles were seized and four American alligators were euthanized following the incident. A coroner's preliminary autopsy report released on August 7 said that the boys died of asphyxiation.

The two boys could be seen cleaning a large glass enclosure originally belonging to a green anaconda in pictures their mother posted on Facebook.

Member of the Legislative Assembly Donald Arseneault expressed frustration in April 2014 that the province would not review New Brunswick's Fish and Wildlife Act until the RCMP investigation was completed. Minister of Natural Resources Paul Robichaud defended the delay, saying that the completed RCMP investigation would help inform a review of the current law.

Although the incident was treated as an accident, the RCMP arrested Savoie in Montreal on February 5, 2015. On March 31, 2015, Savoie was charged with criminal negligence for not preventing the deaths. However, he was found not guilty in a jury trial in November 2016.

== See also ==
- Animal attacks
- Exotic pets
- List of unusual deaths in the 21st century
