= Palazzo Hotel Montecasino =

Hotel in Johannesburg, South Africa

Coordinates: 26°01′30″S 28°00′37″E

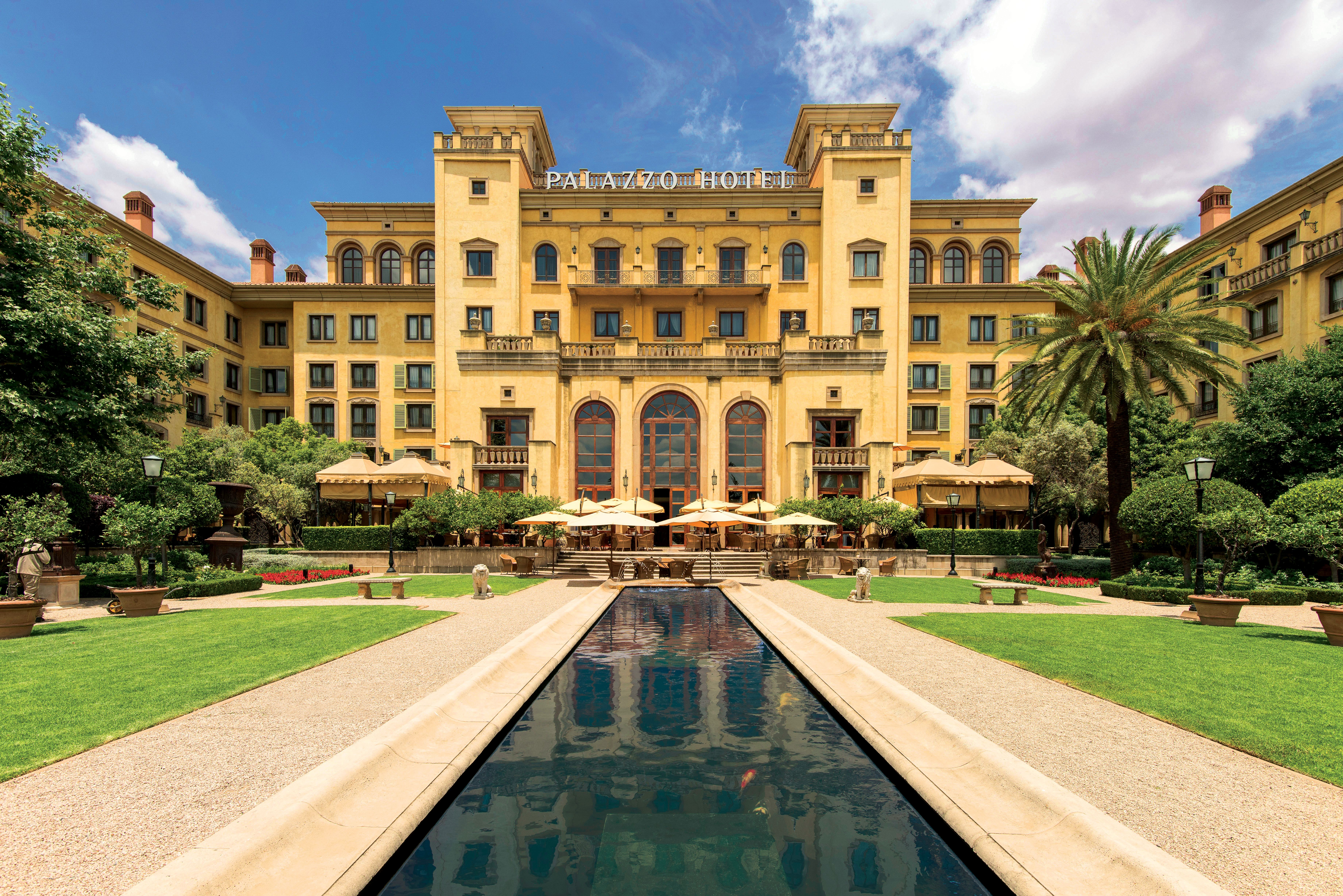
- Interactive map of the Palazzo Hotel Montecasino area

General information
- Location: Fourways, Johannesburg, South Africa

Palazzo Hotel Montecasino is a hotel situated in Fourways, Johannesburg, South Africa, which is a part of the Montecasino Entertainment Complex.

The nearby notable attractions to hotels are the Lion & Safari Park and the Cradle of Humankind. The Palazzo Hotel Montecasino has 246 rooms and suites. It has meeting and event facilities and can accommodate up to 500 guests. The hotel's location within the Montecasino Entertainment Complex offers access to entertainment and leisure activities.
