= Boonreung Buachan =

Thai world record holder

- บุญเรือง บัวจันทร์
- Born: c. 1970
- Died: March 22, 2004 (age 34); Phrai Bueng Hospital
- Cause of death: cobra bite
- Other name: Snakeman of Sisaket
- Known for: World record for spending the most time with snakes in a glass box

Boonreung Buachan, (Thai: บุญเรือง บัวจันทร์, sometimes spelled Boonruang and Bauchan; 1969 – March 22, 2004) was a Thai man known for his ability to handle snakes, especially cobras, which he demonstrated in public performances. In 1998, he set the Guinness Book of World Records title for spending the most time in a container with snakes by staying inside a glass box with the snakes for seven days.

Buachan died on March 24, 2004, after being bitten by a cobra during his daily show in Phrai Bueng, Thailand. He continued with his show, after drinking some herbal medicine and a shot of whiskey, until he collapsed in what was originally assumed to be an epileptic seizure. He was taken while unconscious to Prai Bung Hospital, where he died.

He received a Darwin Award for his death. His death was the subject of National Geographic TV's Hunter Hunted episode "Victims of Venom".

== See also ==
- Animal attack
- List of entertainers who died during a performance
- Ali Khan Samsudin, Malaysian snake charmer killed by cobra bite
