= Hunter Hunted (TV series) =

American television documentary series

Hunter Hunted is a documentary on the National Geographic Channel. It is a show similar to CSI but focuses on animal attacks.

== Episodes ==
=== Season 1 ===
No. overall	No. in season	Title	Featuring	Original release date
1	1	"Predators in Paradise"	American Alligator	2 June 2005
2	2	"Mangrove Maneaters"	Bengal Tiger	28 July 2005
3	3	"Victims of Venom"	Cobra	28 July 2005
4	4	"Death Down Under"	Dingo	6 October 2005
5	5	"Kodiak Attack "	Kodiak Bear	6 October 2005
6	6	"Stalked at Sea"	Great White Shark	21 October 2005
7	7	"Tanzania Terror"	African Lion	20 January 2006
The episode explores the incidents in Tanzania and examines how lions stalk and kill villagers in silence.
8	8	"The Silent Stalker"	Common Vampire Bat	20 January 2006
The episode explores the village of Latin America, where Vampire bats mysteriously kill villagers.
9	9	"Vanished"	Saltwater Crocodile	20 January 2005
10	10	"Kidnapped"	Chacma Baboon	2 July 2006
The episode explores an incident in South Africa where a baboon targets a villager's baby.
11	11	"Shadow Stalkers"	Canadian Timber Wolf	24 July 2006
This episode explores the death of a geological engineer student, Kenton Joel Carnegie, and examines why a pack of wolves attacks him.

=== Season 2 ===
No. overall	No. in season	Title	Featuring	Original release date
12	1	"Dolphin Attack"	Bottlenose Dolphin	2 August 2006
13	2	"Ambushed"	American Black Bear	10 September 2005
The episode explores the incident in the wilderness campsite of a provincial park in Ontario, Canada, where a Black Bear attacks the campers, resulting in a fatal outcome.
14	3	"Shark Invasion"	Bull Shark	2 June 2005
15	4	"Danger in the Delta"	Hippopotamus	19 November 2005
The episode examines the incident of a hippo attack at the Okavango Delta.
16	5	"Horns of Death"	Cape Buffalo	2 June 2005
The episode examines a shocking incident of a Cape Buffalo that targets and gorges a hunter to death
17	6	"Cougars Island"	Cougar	2 June 2005
18	7	""Gator Attack" "	American Alligator	2 June 2005
19	8	"Outback Attack"	Saltwater Crocodile	29 January 2006

=== Season 3 ===
No. overall	No. in season	Title	Featuring	Original release date
20	1	"Bear Man's Land"	Kamchatka brown bear	2 June 2005
This episode explores the death of Vitaly Nikolayenko, a naturalist expert of the Kamchatka Region known as the Bear Man, who a bear mysteriously mauled.
21	2	"Jungle Breakout"	Common Chimpanzee	20 August 2007
This episode explores the incident in Tarcugama Chimpanzee Sanctuary in Sierra Leone, and uncovers how a troop of chimpanzees escaped from their electric-fenced paddock and attacked tourists, resulting in the death of Issa Kanu.
22	3	"Ghosts of the Snow"	Siberian Tiger	20 August 2007
23	4	"Rhino Showdown"	South-central Black Rhinoceros and Southern White Rhinoceros	20 August 2007
This episode explores the incident in South Africa where Black Rhinoceros and White Rhinoceros went on a rampage and attacked tourists for no reason.
24	5	"Dragon King"	Komodo Dragon	1 March 2008
This episode explores the incident in Komodo Island where human settlement with Komodo dragons went wrong.
25	6	"Arctic Attack"	Polar Bear	16 March 2008
This episode explores the incidents in the Arctic island of Svalbard that uncover the recent cause of polar bear attacks towards humans.
