= Crocodile attack =

Crocodile attacks on humans

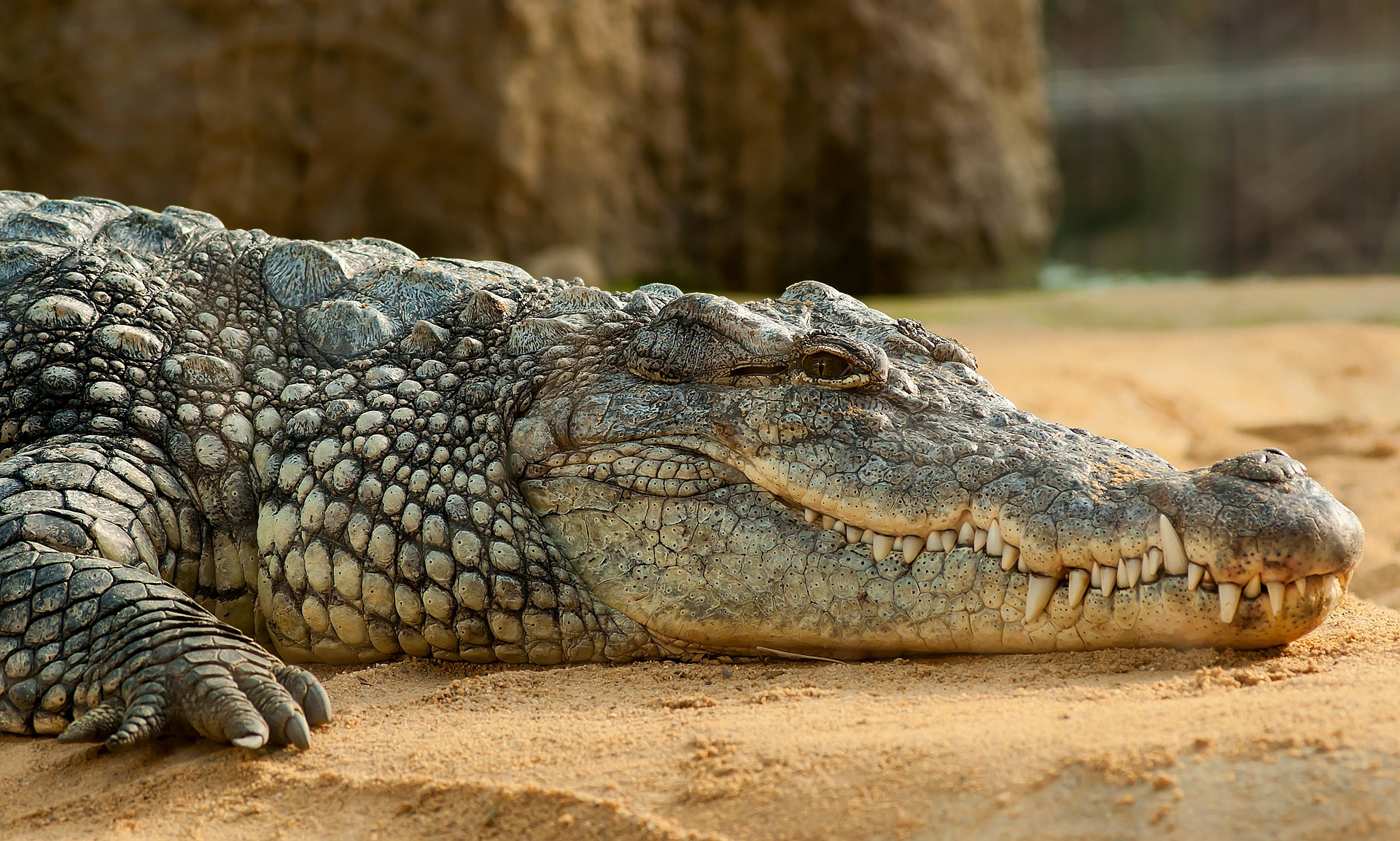
The Nile crocodile is responsible for hundreds of human deaths each year in Sub-Saharan Africa.

Crocodile attacks on humans are common in places where large crocodilians are native to human populations.

== Species involved in attacks ==
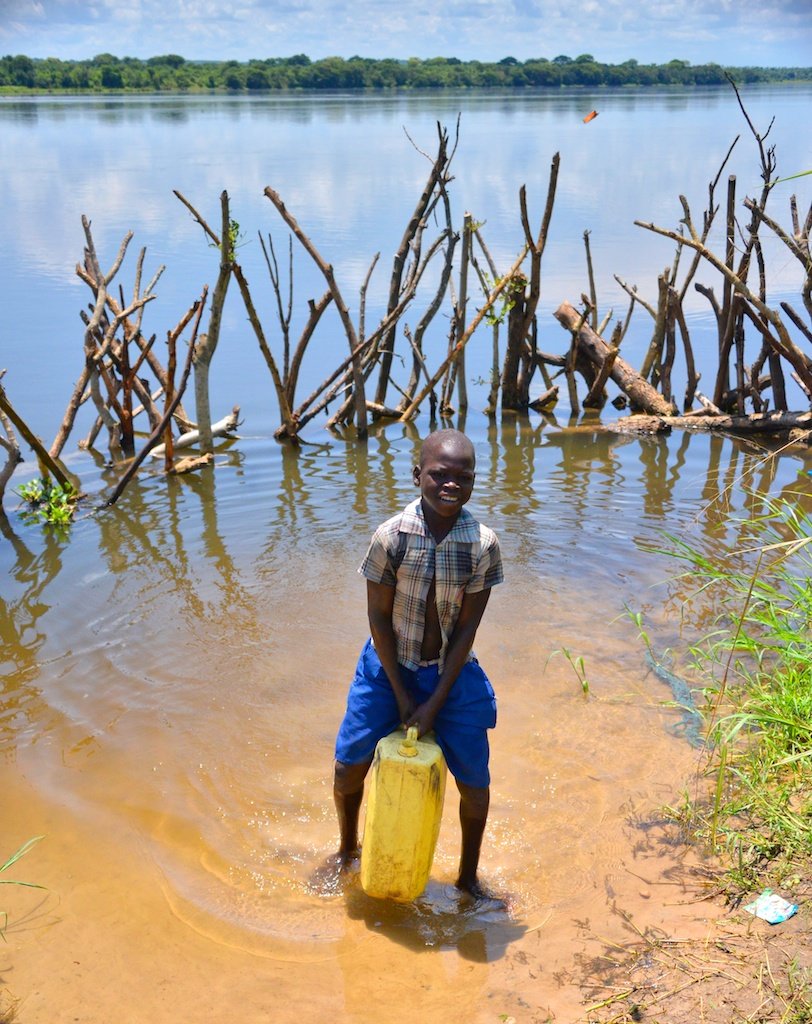
Makeshift barrier in Uganda to lessen the risk of Nile crocodile attacks

The two species with the most well-known reputation for preying on humans are the Nile crocodile and saltwater crocodile, and these are the perpetrators of the vast majority of both fatal and non-fatal crocodilian attacks. Each year, hundreds of deadly attacks are attributed to the Nile crocodile in Sub-Saharan Africa. Attacks by saltwater crocodiles often occur in Southeast Asia, Australia, New Guinea, and the Solomon Islands. Reviews indicate that at least half of all attacks by the Nile and saltwater crocodiles are fatal (in Australia, however, only about 25% of saltwater crocodile attacks are fatal). The mugger crocodile is also very dangerous to humans, killing several people in India every year and with a fatality rate that is almost as high (slightly less than half of all attacks are fatal). Unlike the predatory attacks by Nile and saltwater crocodiles, victims of mugger crocodiles are often not eaten, indicating that many attacks by this species are territorial or defensive rather than predatory. Crocodilians will defend not only themselves, but also their nest and young from anything they perceive as a threat.

Eight other species have been involved in fatal attacks on humans, but in far lower numbers than the Nile, saltwater and mugger crocodiles, and also with significantly lower fatality rates (a higher percentage of their attacks are non-fatal). These are the American alligator (making up an estimated 6% of fatal crocodilian attacks), West African crocodile (often considered quite harmless, but has been involved in several attacks, also fatal), American crocodile (only a few documented fatalities), the Morelet's crocodile (typically considered a relatively non-threatening species, but there have been several fatal attacks), Orinoco crocodile (fatalities recorded in the 1930s and earlier when the species was more common, but today it is very rare), Cuban crocodile (generally considered aggressive, but only one confirmed fatality), black caiman (fatal attacks confirmed in Brazil, but possibly underreported because of its remote range), false gharial (only a few confirmed fatalities, all involving very large false gharials) and gharial (a single known fatality, without consumption).

In addition to these, the freshwater crocodile, Philippine crocodile, Siamese crocodile, broad-snouted caiman, spectacled caiman and yacare caiman have been involved in non-fatal attacks. Four of them, the Siamese crocodile, broad-snouted caiman, spectacled caiman and yacare caiman, each are suspected to have been the perpetrator of a single fatal attack on a child (smaller and therefore a more likely target than an adult), although for each of these cases the identity of the species is not completely certain.

== Background ==
An accurate count of annual crocodile attacks on humans is difficult to obtain. Many of the areas in which humans and large crocodiles come into contact are remote, impoverished, or in areas of political unrest. Crocodile attacks are not always reported to local authorities, and some reports are difficult to verify. Nevertheless, some information does exist: for example, it was reported by CAMPFIRE in Zimbabwe that in the first ten months of the year in 2005, crocodiles were the number one cause of death in humans where wildlife was involved – with the number of deaths cited as 13.

Unlike other "man-eating" crocodiles, such as the saltwater crocodile, the Nile crocodile lives in proximity to human populations, so contact is more frequent. Although most attacks are not reported, the Nile crocodile is estimated to kill hundreds (possibly thousands) of people each year, which is more than all other crocodilian species combined. One study posited the number of attacks by Nile crocodiles per year as 275 to 745, of which 63% are fatal, as opposed to an estimated 30 attacks per year by saltwater crocodiles, of which 50% are fatal. In both species, the mean size of crocodiles involved in nonfatal attacks was about 3 m (10 ft) as opposed to a reported range of 2.5–5 m (8–16 ft) or larger for crocodiles responsible for fatal attacks. Since a majority of fatal attacks are believed to be predatory in nature, the Nile crocodile can be considered the most prolific predator of humans among wild animals.

The most deaths in a single crocodile attack incident may have occurred during the Battle of Ramree Island, on February 19, 1945, in what is now Myanmar. Nine hundred soldiers of an Imperial Japanese Army unit, in an attempt to retreat from the Royal Navy and rejoin a larger battalion of the Japanese infantry, crossed through sixteen kilometres (ten miles) of mangrove swamps that contained saltwater crocodiles. Twenty Japanese soldiers were captured alive by the British, and almost five hundred are known to have escaped Ramree. Many of the remainder may have been eaten by the crocodiles, although since this incident took place during an active military conflict, it is impossible to know how many deaths can be directly attributed to the crocodiles instead of combat-related causes.

== List of notable attacks ==
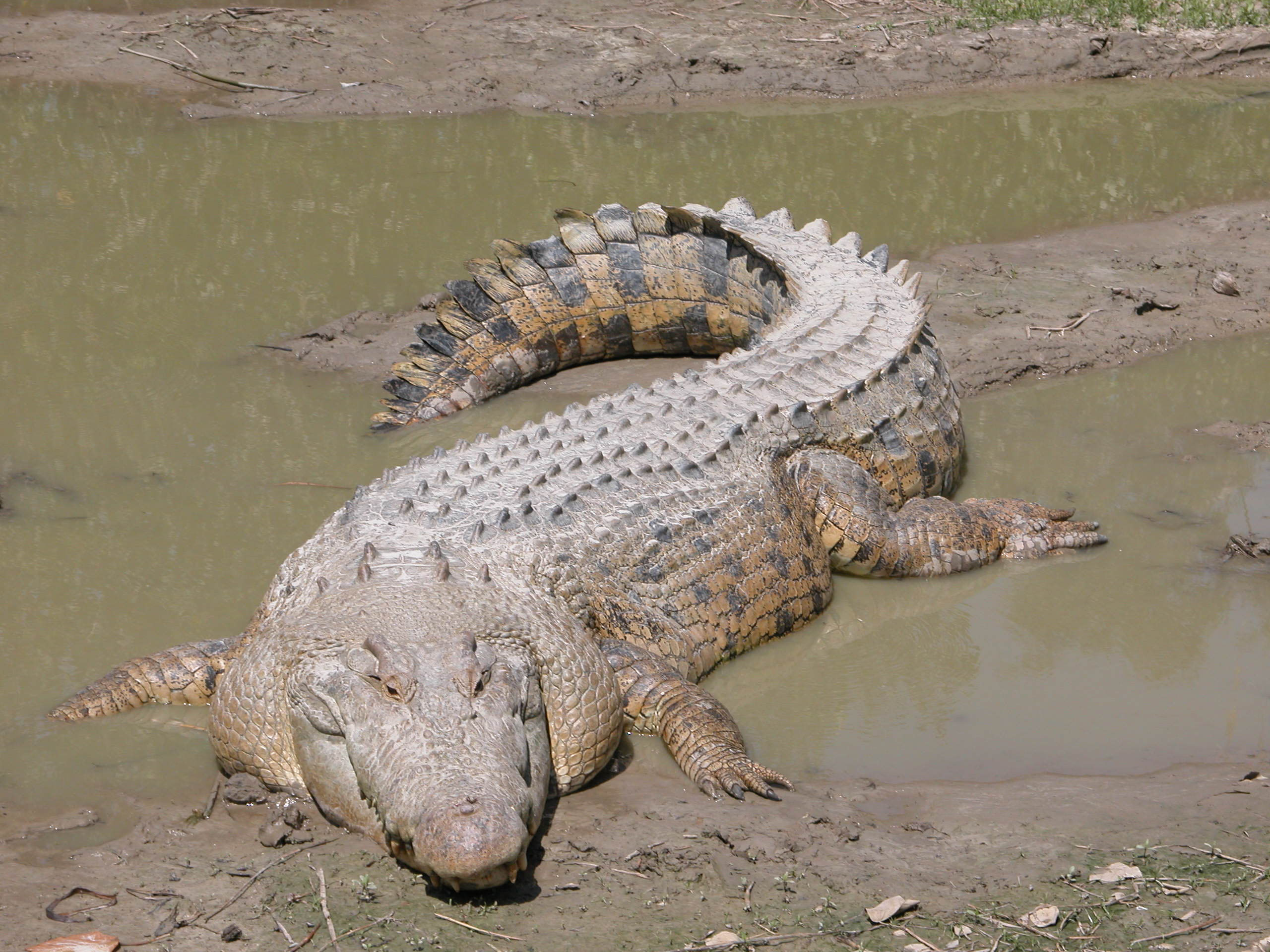
Saltwater crocodile

It is estimated that each year hundreds of people die from crocodile attacks in Africa – many of these attacks are never reported in the media. Without an accurate reporting system in place, crocodile attacks in Africa are difficult to track and very few are reproduced here. The majority of attacks recorded below have occurred in Southeast Asia and Australia.

1980s

- On March 17, 1987, 40-year-old Kerry Mcloughlin was killed by a crocodile while fishing with his son Michael in Kakadu National Park in the Northern Territory of Australia.
- On March 29, 1987, Ginger Faye Meadows, an American model, was killed by a crocodile while swimming in the Prince Regent River near Broome, Western Australia before her birthday. She and her friend Jane Burchett were cornered by the crocodile, so she tried to get away from it, but it caught up to her and killed her.

1990s

- On May 22, 1992, an Iban girl Dayang anak Bayang was killed by Bujang Senang at Pelaban River, another tributary of the great Batang Lupar River near Lingga in Sri Aman Division, Sarawak, Malaysia. The crocodile was shot to death by several police sharpshooters and Iban hunters. It was the biggest and oldest crocodile ever caught in the area.

2000s

- In January 2001, attacks by mugger crocodiles were reported on tribal population around the Neyyar reservoir in Kerala, India. Muggers are raised and periodically released into the reservoir from the Neyyar crocodile centre. This rare display of aggression was found to be the isolated behaviour of an abnormal minority among the Neyyar muggers, which are usually not known to attack humans.
- In October 2002, 23-year-old German student Isabel von Jordan was killed by a saltwater crocodile in Australia's Kakadu National Park while swimming in Sandy Billabong with her sister Valerie and a few other foreign backpackers. The tour guide, Glenn Robless, pleaded guilty to a charge of making a dangerous omission with a suspended prison sentence.. The attack and its aftermath made international headlines, and were the subject of considerable notoriety within Australia.
- Gustave is the nickname of a crocodile which has been credited with killing hundreds of people at the Rusizi River in Burundi. His size is estimated at 6 metres (20 ft) and more than 900 kilograms (2,000 lb). Numerous capture attempts have been made, including using a massive bear trap in 2002; however, Gustave has evaded capture. Gustave is the basis of the film Primeval (originally titled "Gustave"), which follows a news team sent to Burundi to capture Gustave; while doing so they become a target of a warlord in the midst of an African civil war.
- In September 2005, Russell Harris, a 37-year-old British engineer, was killed by a large saltwater crocodile while snorkeling off Picnic Beach in Australia. His body was recovered.
- On March 19, 2006, University of Washington medical professor Richard Root, age 68, who had moved to alleviate a shortage of physicians, was killed on a wildlife tour of the Limpopo River when a crocodile emerged from the river and pulled him underwater.
- In April 2007, a 9-year-old Chinese child was killed in a crocodile pool at the Silver Beach holiday resort in southwest Guangxi region.
- On February 8, 2009, 5-year-old Jeremy Doble was attacked by a crocodile in far north Queensland Daintree River, Australia. Police confirmed that human remains found in a saltwater crocodile caught nearby were those of the boy.
- On March 15, 2009, 11-year-old Briony Goodsell was killed by a crocodile when swimming with friends at Lambell's Lagoon near Humpty Doo in Northern Territory.

2010s

- In April 2010, a 25-year-old woman from New Jersey was killed by a saltwater crocodile while snorkeling in India's Andaman Islands. Havelock Island, where the attack took place, lies 72 kilometres (45 mi) from the Lohabarrack Salt Water Crocodile Sanctuary. Her boyfriend caught the attack on film; the camera was recovered two days later along with her remains.
- On December 7, 2010, South African outdoorsman Hendrik Coetzee was killed after being attacked by a Nile crocodile. Coetzee was leading a kayaking expedition through Congo's Lukuga River when a crocodile, which had been concealed below the surface of the river, attacked him from behind. The crocodile pulled him from his kayak into the water and he never resurfaced. Neither Coetzee's remains nor any of his clothing or gear was found.
- On September 4, 2011, Lolong, a 20.2-foot (6.17-metre) saltwater crocodile believed to be the largest ever captured, was trapped in the southern Philippines after a spate of fatal attacks. The crocodile is suspected of eating a farmer who went missing in July in the town of Bunawan and of killing a 12-year-old girl whose head was bitten off two years before.
- On May 29, 2016, 46-year-old Cindy Waldron and her childhood friend, Leann Mitchell, 47, went for a late night swim at Thornton Beach in Daintree National Park, Australia, to celebrate the end of Mitchell's cancer treatment. Waldron was snatched by a crocodile and called for help. Mitchell tried to save her but was unsuccessful. What were believed to be Waldron's remains were found inside a 14-foot crocodile on June 3, 2016.
- On September 14, 2017, 24-year-old Financial Times journalist Paul McClean was reportedly killed by a crocodile near Arugam Bay in Sri Lanka. McClean stopped by a lagoon known as Crocodile Rock to wash his hands when a crocodile bit him and dragged him into the water. The lagoon is known for its large population of crocodiles.
- In July 2018, a man was reportedly killed by a saltwater crocodile in a breeding farm in West Papua, Indonesia. Locals slaughtered 292 crocodiles in revenge.
- On January 11, 2019, scientist Deasy Tuwo was eaten alive by a crocodile after falling into an enclosure at a research facility in North Sulawesi, Indonesia. Local police say the crocodile leaped up against the wall of the enclosure during feeding time and grabbed Tuwo, pulling her into the pool and eating parts of her body.

2020s

- On 3 May 2023, 65-year-old Kevin Darmody was last seen at Kennedy's Bend in a remote part of northern Queensland. After a two-day search of the area, police euthanized two large crocodiles and found human remains, which are believed to belong to Darmody.
- On May 26, 2023, about 40 crocodiles killed a Cambodian man after he fell into their enclosure on his family's reptile farm. Luan Nam, 72, was trying to move a crocodile out of a cage where it had laid eggs when it grabbed the stick he was using as a goad and pulled him in.
- On July 29, 2023, 29-year-old Costa Rican footballer Jesus Alberto Lopez Ortiz was attacked and killed by an American crocodile while swimming in Cañas River, in Costa Rica.
- On 2 July 2024, a 12 year old girl was taken by a crocodile while swimming with her family in Mango Creek, near Nganmarriyanga, Northern Territory. Her remains were found two days later.
- On 3 August 2024, whilst holidaying with his wife and three sons in North Queensland, Doctor David Hogbin was taken by a 3.9 metre saltwater crocodile when a riverbank on the Annan River gave way and he slipped into the water below. Remains later found inside the crocodile were confirmed to be Hogbin’s.
- Between 2007 and the end of 2024, East Timor recorded 173 crocodile attacks on humans, 78 of them fatal. Those figures represented a record high, and a 23-fold increase since East Timorese independence from Indonesia in 2002 (during the Indonesian occupation of East Timor, the occupying authorities would regularly kill crocodiles). Most of the victims were impoverished fishermen.
- On 14 August 2025, a 53-year-old man called Arifuddin was killed by a crocodile while bathing with his family in the Bulete River in South Sulawesi, Indonesia. Local residents later retrieved his remains about one mile from where he was initially attacked and handed them over to his family for a burial.

=== Notable attack survivors ===
- Australian philosopher Val Plumwood survived a prolonged saltwater crocodile attack during a solo canoe excursion in Kakadu National Park in 1985. Plumwood recounted the details of the attack and her escape in her 1996 essay "Being Prey". Following the attack, she spent a month in intensive care in a Darwin hospital and required extensive skin grafts.
- In December 2003, two Australian teenagers, Shaun Blowers and Ashley McGough, both 19, spent 22 hours in a tree above rising flood waters after a crocodile killed their friend and "showed him off" to them as it held the body in its jaws.
- In July 2006, a 7-year-old boy was bitten by a 1.7-metre (5.6-foot) Nile crocodile at a French safari park after falling into its enclosure.
- In April 2013, 29-year-old French fisherman Yoann Galeran was attacked by a 2-metre (6.5-foot) crocodile as he swam along a remote stretch of Australia's northern coast. The reptile tried to kill him with the death roll until it let go of him five seconds later. Galeran was taken to a hospital, where he received several stitches to wounds to his head and neck.
- In July 2014, 31-year-old zookeeper Trent Burton was grabbed and dragged underwater by a saltwater crocodile during a feeding show at a zoo in New South Wales. He suffered minor puncture injuries to both hands.
- On August 24, 2014, 26-year-old Alejandro Jimenez and his friend, Lisset Rendon, 23, went for a late night swim at a lake in Coral Gables, Florida, for a party, when a 9-foot (2.7 m) American Crocodile bit Jimenez on his torso and hand while Rendon was bitten on her shoulder; Jimenez and Rendon were hospitalized the next day.
- In January 2017, a 47-year-old French tourist got bitten by a Siamese crocodile in Khao Yai National Park in Thailand after she went off the trail to take a selfie with the crocodiles.
- On April 30, 2018, 25-year-old former tennis player Zanele Ndlovu was canoeing on the Upper Zambezi River in Zimbabwe when she was pulled underwater by a Nile crocodile. Ndlovu lost her right arm in the attack.
- On August 20, 2019, 79-year-old Lasse Liedegren was bitten by a crocodile at Skansen aquarium in Sweden during a gentlemen's club party. He stood in front of the crocodiles enclosure, and when he reached back out with his left arm over the glass barrier, the crocodile reacted and attacked. He later had his left arm amputated due to the attack.
- On August 23, 2019, a male Philippine crocodile at Zürich Zoologischer Garten attacked a zookeeper, biting through a partition into her hand while she was cleaning the enclosure. The animal was 1.5 metres (4 ft) long and weighed 15 kilograms (33 lb). After it didn't let off her for several minutes, the crocodile was shot by other zookeepers who feared that it could rotate and tear off the hand. Because her hand was severely injured, the victim underwent surgery.
- On November 10, 2021, 68-year-old Nehemias Chipada was bitten on his left arm by a 12-foot crocodile mistaken as an animal statue in Amaya View, a mountain resort in Cagayan De Oro, Philippines, while taking a picture with it. It was his birthday when the incident happened. Though seriously wounded, he was later able to escape the attack and hospitalized for recovery. A crocodile tooth was found in his arm during surgery. The resort paid Chipada's hospital expenses and apologized for the incident.
- On November 30, 2021, 18-year-old Amelie Osborn-Smith was attacked by a Nile crocodile in the Zambezi River, Zambia. Osborn-Smith and her friends were able to prevent the crocodile from dragging her underwater, sustaining blood loss as well as serious injuries to her hip, lower leg, and right foot. Osborn-Smith told SkyNews that she intends to return to Zambia in the future to start a school for local children.
- On August 18, 2024, a 45-year-old maintenance worker at Jerusalem Biblical Zoo was severely injured by a male crocodile named Clarence. A security guard stopped the attack by shooting the animal, which later died of his wounds. Before Clarence was donated to the zoo in 2013, he had been a pet of British physician Dr. Reginald Morris for 30 years.
- On April 28, 2025, a 29-year-old man was bitten on his right leg by a 15-foot saltwater crocodile mistaken as a life-size statue after intentionally entering an enclosure in Kabug Mangrove Park and Wetlands in Siay, Zamboanga Sibugay, Philippines. Footage of the incident show the crocodile, who locals fondly named Lalay, repeatedly dragged and threw around the victim inside the enclosure until Lalay released him when an owner of the park arrived to further rescue the man out of the enclosure. Sustaining bite injuries in his legs and arms, the man was given first aid and later hospitalized for further medications. The park's owner covered the victim's hospital expenses. Local authorities found the victim mentally unstable according to his relatives.

== See also ==
- List of fatal alligator attacks in the United States
- Animal attacks
- Battle of Ramree Island
- List of diving hazards and precautions
- Man-eater
