= Operation Matador (1945) =

Coordinates: 19.431°N 93.527°E

- Part of the Burma Campaign of the South-East Asian theatre of World War II
- Location: Kyaukpyu, Ramree Island, British Burma
- Date: 21–22 January 1945

Operation Matador was an amphibious thrust, during the Burma Campaign in January 1945, to capture the strategic port of Kyaukpyu, located at the northern tip of Ramree Island, south of Akyab across Hunter's Bay, as well as the key airfield near the port. On 21 January 1945, an hour before the Indian 71st Brigade was to land, the battleship HMS Queen Elizabeth opened fire with her main battery while planes from the escort carrier HMS Ameer spotted for her. The light cruiser HMS Phoebe also joined the bombardment, along with Liberators and Thunderbolts of No. 224 Group RAF which bombed and strafed to soften up the beaches. The assault troops landed unopposed and secured the beachhead; the following day, the Indian 4th Infantry Brigade landed.

== See also ==
- Battle of Ramree Island
