= HMS Ameer (D01) =

American escort carrier transferred to the Royal Navy

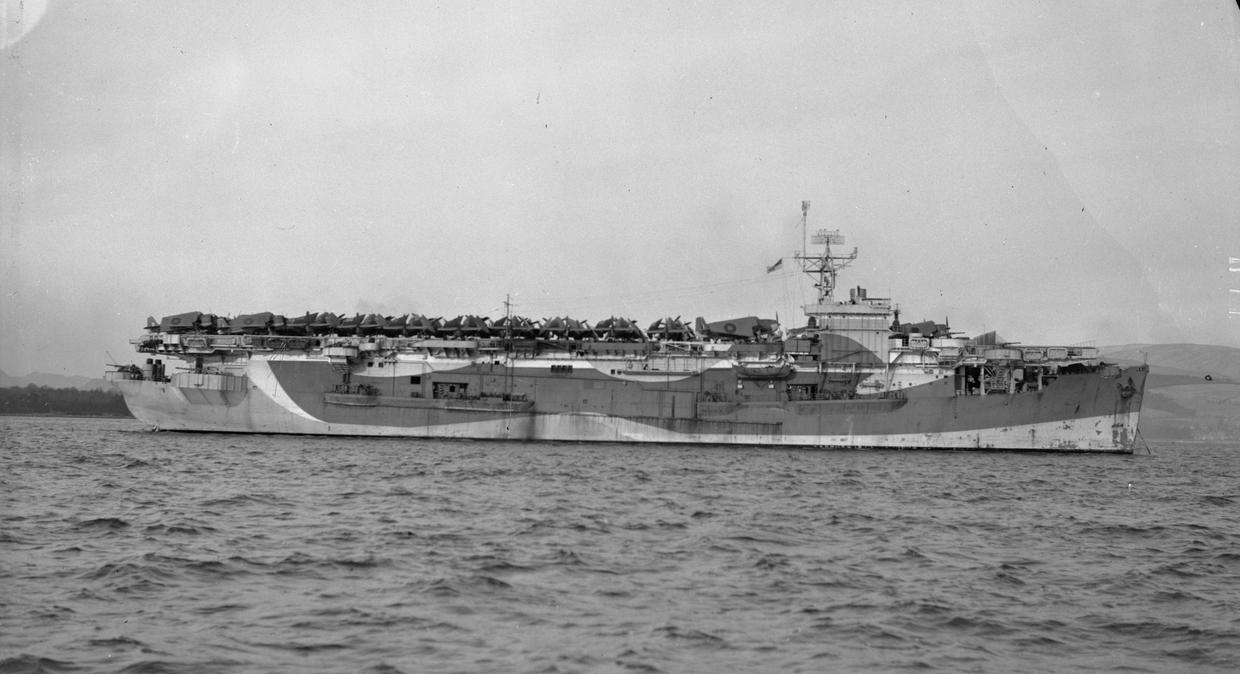

History

United States
- Name: USS Baffins
- Namesake: Baffin Bay in Texas
- Builder: Seattle-Tacoma Shipbuilding Corporation
- Laid down: 18 July 1942
- Launched: 18 October 1942
- Fate: Transferred to Royal Navy

United Kingdom
- Name: HMS Ameer
- Commissioned: 20 July 1943
- Decommissioned: 20 March 1946
- Stricken: 1946
- Identification: Pennant number: D01
- Fate: Sold as a merchant ship; scrapped 1969

General characteristics
- Class & type: Bogue-class escort carrier (USA); Ruler-class escort carrier (UK)
- Displacement: 8,333 tons
- Length: 495 ft 7 in (151.05 m)
- Beam: 69 ft 6 in (21.18 m)
- Draught: 26 ft (7.9 m)
- Propulsion: Steam turbines, 1 shaft, 8,500 shp (6.3 MW)
- Speed: 17 kn (31 km/h; 20 mph)
- Complement: 890
- Armament: 2 × 4"/50, 5"/38 or 5"/51 guns
- Aircraft carried: 24

Service record
- Part of: Eastern Fleet
- Operations: Battle of Ramree Island; Operation Tiderace

HMS Ameer (D01) was an American escort carrier, USS Baffins (CVE-35), that was transferred to the Royal Navy in mid-1943. As a Ruler-class escort carrier it served in the Far East until the end of the war. Ameer was returned to the US Navy in 1946 and sold off to commercial service.

== Design and description ==
These ships were all larger and had a greater aircraft capacity than all the preceding American-built escort carriers. They were also all laid down as escort carriers and not converted merchant ships. The ships had a complement of 646 men and an overall length of 492 feet 3 inches (150.0 m), a beam of 69 feet 6 inches (21.2 m) and a draught of 25 ft 6 in (7.8 m). Propulsion was provided by a steam turbine, two boilers connected to one shaft giving 9,350 brake horsepower (SHP), which could propel the ship at 16.5 knots (30.6 km/h; 19.0 mph).

Aircraft facilities were a small combined bridge–flight control on the starboard side, two aircraft lifts 43 feet (13.1 m) by 34 feet (10.4 m), one aircraft catapult and nine arrestor wires. Aircraft could be housed in the 260 feet (79.2 m) by 62 feet (18.9 m) hangar below the flight deck. Armament comprised two 4"/50, 5"/38 or 5"/51 dual purpose guns in single mounts, sixteen 40 mm Bofors anti-aircraft guns in twin mounts and twenty 20 mm Oerlikon anti-aircraft guns in single mounts. The carriers had a maximum aircraft capacity of twenty-four which could be a mixture of Martlet, Corsair or Sea Hurricane fighter aircraft and Swordfish or Avenger anti-submarine aircraft.

== Pre-service ==
Baffins was launched 18 October 1942 by Seattle-Tacoma Shipbuilding, Tacoma, Washington; sponsored by Mrs. Laurence Bennett, wife of Commander Bennett; and commissioned 28 June 1943. Baffins remained at Puget Sound Navy Yard until 18 July 1943. Her classification was changed to CVE-35 on 15 July 1943. On 18 July, she proceeded to Vancouver, British Columbia, Canada, where she was decommissioned the following day and transferred to the United Kingdom under Lend-Lease. Now HMS Ameer, she was refitted to Royal Navy requirements, including a lengthened flight deck, the installation of ASDIC (Sonar), the adaptation of fire-fighting and ventilation systems, and the alteration of bomb and torpedo storage to accommodate either American or British ordnance.

== Service ==
Once she arrived in Britain, she was allocated to the Eastern Fleet, sailing as escort in May 1944 to Convoy KMF-31 to the Mediterranean, while en route to Trincomalee, Ceylon. There, she joined her sister ships HMS Battler, HMS Begum and HMS Shah. In early 1945, Ameer joined Force 61 as cover for Operation Lightning, the amphibious assault by 3 Commando Brigade (two Royal Marine units and one Army unit) on Akyab, Burma. The Japanese forces had evacuated the area 48 hours earlier, making a heavy bombardment unnecessary.

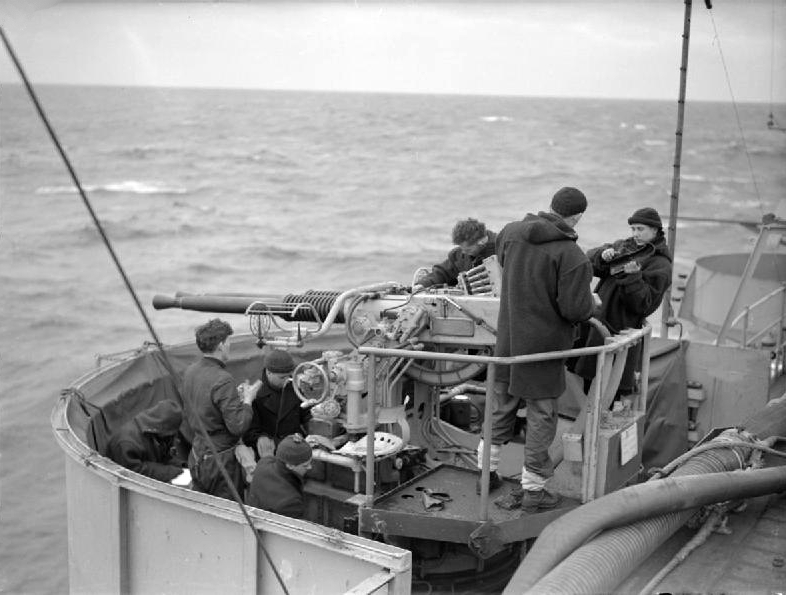
Twin 40 mm Bofors anti-aircraft gun.

Ameer's next operation was Operation Matador to capture Ramree Island, where her aircraft spotted fall of shot for HMS Queen Elizabeth, on 21 January 1945. The bombardment was to reduce Japanese artillery batteries in advance of landings by the 71st and 4th Brigades. A few days later, Ameer covered landings on nearby Cheduba Island by the Royal Marines (Operation Sankey) but the island had been evacuated.

On 22 February 1945, Ameer sailed from Trincomalee, in Force 62 with HMS Empress, the light cruiser HMS Kenya, six destroyers and six frigates. The objective was Operation Stacey, the first of three photo-reconnaissance missions to cover the Hastings Harbor and Phuket Island areas of the Kra Isthmus. The reconnaissance was went ahead without Japanese interference on 26 to 28 February. The following day the task force was located and attacked. F6F fighters from Ameer and Empress repulsed the Japanese aircraft.

In June 1945, Force 63, including Ameer and her sister ships HMS Khedive, and HMS Stalker, left Trincomalee for Operation Balsam, the third and last photo-reconnaissance mission over Malaya. On 20 June, at the end of the operation, the task force pilots executed offensive sweeps. Ameer's Hellcats joined those from 808 Naval Air Squadron and Supermarine Seafires from 809 Naval Air Squadron to attack Japanese air bases at Lhoksemawe, Medan and Bindjai, strafing installations and aircraft. Anti-aircraft fire shot down one Hellcat.

Ameer's last two operations were in support of mine-sweeping off potential landing sites. The first, with escort carrier HMS Emperor, light cruiser HMS Nigeria and destroyers HMS Roebuck, HMS Eskimo and HMS Vigilant, provided air cover and bombardment off the Nicobar Islands over 9 and 10 July. The second, Operation Livery, starting on 24 July, cleared the approaches to Phuket Island, off the Kra Isthmus; HMS Nelson was part of the covering force. On 26 July, Task Force 63 came under bomber and kamikaze attack and the minesweeper HMS Vestal was hit. Japan surrendered three weeks later.

== Squadrons ==
As a fighter carrier, HMS Ameer could carry up to 24 aircraft. She carried mostly American Hellcat IIs (at first called Gannet) fighters, although Wildcat Vs (initially called Martlets) were also carried, as were Walrus I amphibians at the end of the war.

Dates	FAA sqns	Aircraft type
July–August 1944	845	Wildcat V
Dec 1944 – March 1945	804	Hellcat II
Dec 1944	845	Wildcat V
April–Sept 1945	896	Hellcat II
May–Oct 1945	804	Hellcat II
June 1945	888	Hellcat II
July–Aug 1945	1700 Dt	Walrus I

== Post-war ==
HMS Ameer was returned to the United States Navy at Norfolk, Virginia on 17 January 1946 and subsequently sold into merchant service 17 September 1946 as Robin Kirk. She was later scrapped in Taiwan in 1969.
