= Hendrik Coetzee =

South African outdoorsman

- Born: Hendrik Coetzee; March 22, 1975; Ottosdal, South Africa
- Disappeared: 7 December 2010; Lukuga River, Democratic Republic of the Congo
- Status: Missing presumed dead
- Cause of death: Taken by crocodile
- Other name: Hendri Coetzee
- Occupations: Adventurer, tour leader
- Employer: Kayak the Nile
- Television: The Longest River
- Website: greatwhiteexplorer.blogspot.com

Hendrik "Hendri" Coetzee (22 March 1975 – 7 December 2010) was a South African outdoorsman and author. He was killed after being taken by a crocodile in December 2010.

Coetzee gained prominence in 2004 leading a Nile River source-to-sea expedition, following in the path of John Goddard's expedition. The expedition set off from Lake Victoria in Uganda on 17 January, reaching Khartoum on 25 March and the Mediterranean Sea at Rosetta on 21 May. The purpose of the trip was to draw attention to the humanitarian situation in the region in partnership with CARE. Following claims that the expedition had not begun from the true source of the Nile, Coetzee's party undertook a further journey from Kagera to Lake Victoria in April 2005, adding 750 km to the 6700 km they completed in 2004.

Coetzee was the leader of an expedition going from the source of the White Nile into the Congo when he was pulled from his kayak by a crocodile. He was never seen again. The trip was the first-of-its-kind kayaking expedition from the White Nile and Congo rivers into the Congo to explore the Ruzizi and Lualaba Rivers. The two other men on the trip, Americans and also experienced kayakers, witnessed the attack. They were documenting unexplored whitewater and development projects in the region.

A memorial service for Coetzee was held on 28 January 2011.

The documentary short film Kadoma about Coetzee was released in 2011. His story was also featured in 2022 as an episode on National Geographic's Edge of the Unknown With Jimmy Chin.
