= Dinesh Wadiwel =

Australian social and political theorist

- Born: Dinesh Joseph Wadiwel

Academic background
- Education: University of Western Sydney
- Influences: Michel Foucault, Giorgio Agamben, Roberto Esposito, and Achille Mbembe

Academic work
- Discipline: Social theory, political theory
- Sub-discipline: Disability studies, critical animal studies
- Institutions: University of Sydney
- Notable works: The War Against Animals

Dinesh Joseph Wadiwel is an Australian social and political theorist who is presently an associate professor in Human Rights and Socio-Legal Studies at the University of Sydney. His work addresses critical animal studies, the rights of disabled people, and theoretical perspectives on violence.

== Career ==
Wadiwel worked for 15 years in the third sector, including with the Australian Council of Social Service. He completed his doctorate in Political Philosophy and Cultural Studies at the University of Western Sydney in 2006. He subsequently moved to the University of Sydney, where he is now (as of 2023) an associate professor.

Wadiwel is the author of the 2015 monograph The War Against Animals, published by Brill. In the book, he argues that humans are in a state of (literal) war with animals. The primary philosophical influence is the work of Michel Foucault, though other important influences include Giorgio Agamben, Roberto Esposito, and Achille Mbembe. For Wadiwel, mainstream approaches to animal ethics (including the classic works of Peter Singer and Tom Regan, and more recent works of Donna Haraway as well as those of Sue Donaldson and Will Kymlicka) are insufficient for failing to appreciate the near-complete internalisation of a human belief in sovereignty over animals; indeed, he argues that the works reinforce them. Drawing upon Foucauldian notions of biopower, governmentality, and counter-conduct, Wadiwel argues for the existence of, and examines the detail of, the war against animals. He argues that capitalism is complicit in the war, and that the commodification of animals is an inherently violent act. Wadiwel calls for resistance against the war. This resistance includes veganism and other pro-animal practices, but also a truce, even if only (initially) for a day.

Wadiwel was a part of The Human Animal Research Network Editorial Collective that edited the 2015 Sydney University Press collection Animals in the Anthropocene: Critical Perspectives on Non-human Futures. He also co-edited the 2016 collection Foucault and Animals with Matthew Chrulew. In the Editors’ Introduction to their 2017 book Foucault and Animals Chrulew and Wadiwel write, "there is great need to further explore the analytical relevance of Foucault's notion of biopower in the context of regulating and managing "non-human lives and populations". Leonard Lawlor has articulated a philosophy of "life-ism" opposed to biopower, a notion of immanence of life beyond "man and his doubles" that places death, finitude and powerlessness at the heart of life.

In 2023, Wadiwel's book Animals and Capital was published by Edinburgh University Press.

== Select bibliography ==
- Wadiwel, Dinesh, and Carrie Hayter (2010). Communicating Difference: Understanding Communications Consumers from Non English Speaking Backgrounds (NESB). Sydney, Australia: Australian Communications Consumer Action Network.
- Wadiwel, Dinesh (2015). The War Against Animals. Leiden, Netherlands: Brill.
  - Japanese translation (現代思想からの動物論. 戦争・主権・生政治) published by Jimbun Shoin in 2019.
- Human Animal Research Network Editorial Collective (2015). Animals in the Anthropocene. Sydney, Australia: Sydney University Press.
- Chrulew, Matthew; Wadiwel, Dinesh, eds. (2016). Foucault and Animals. Human-Animal Studies. Vol. 18. Leiden, Netherlands: Brill.
- Wadiwel, Dinesh (2023). Animals and Capital. Edinburgh: Edinburgh University Press.
