= Richard Root =

American doctor (1937–2006)

Richard K. Root (December 1, 1937 – March 19, 2006) was the former chairman of medicine at Yale University, Chairman of Medicine at University of California, San Francisco, and chairman of medicine at University of Washington. He also launched the Infectious Disease division at the University of Pennsylvania while a professor there in 1971.

Root received his MD from Johns Hopkins University in 1963 and did his residency in internal medicine at Massachusetts General Hospital from 1963-1965. He served as chief resident and instructor in the Department of Medicine at the University of Washington from 1968 to 1969.

After leaving the University of Pennsylvania, Root worked on infectious diseases at Yale University and served as vice chairman of medicine. In 1982 he was voted medical school teacher of the year. He subsequently became the chief of medicine at the University of California, San Francisco. He later became chief of medicine at Harborview 1991 and became an emeritus professor in 2002. He was a former president of the American Federation of Clinical Research, editor in chief of a textbook, Clinical Infectious Diseases, and, from 1986 to 1991, director of the National Institutes of Health's AIDS Advisory Committee.

In 2006, he was invited by the University of Pennsylvania Infectious Disease Department to assist a project in Botswana. He was killed by a crocodile attack while on a wildlife tour of the Limpopo River in the Tuli Nature Reserve. He was in the lead canoe with a guide when a 13–15 ft (4.0–4.6 m) crocodile pulled him overboard. While at least one article has aligned the story to the popular notion of unstable dugout canoes turning over, the trip pictures taken by his wife reveal Root and his guide riding in a sound commercially manufactured vessel. Witnesses state that the canoe shook but was not overturned. Root's body was found four days later, near the site of the initial attack.
