= Emily (cow) =

Female cow who escaped from a slaughterhouse in 1995

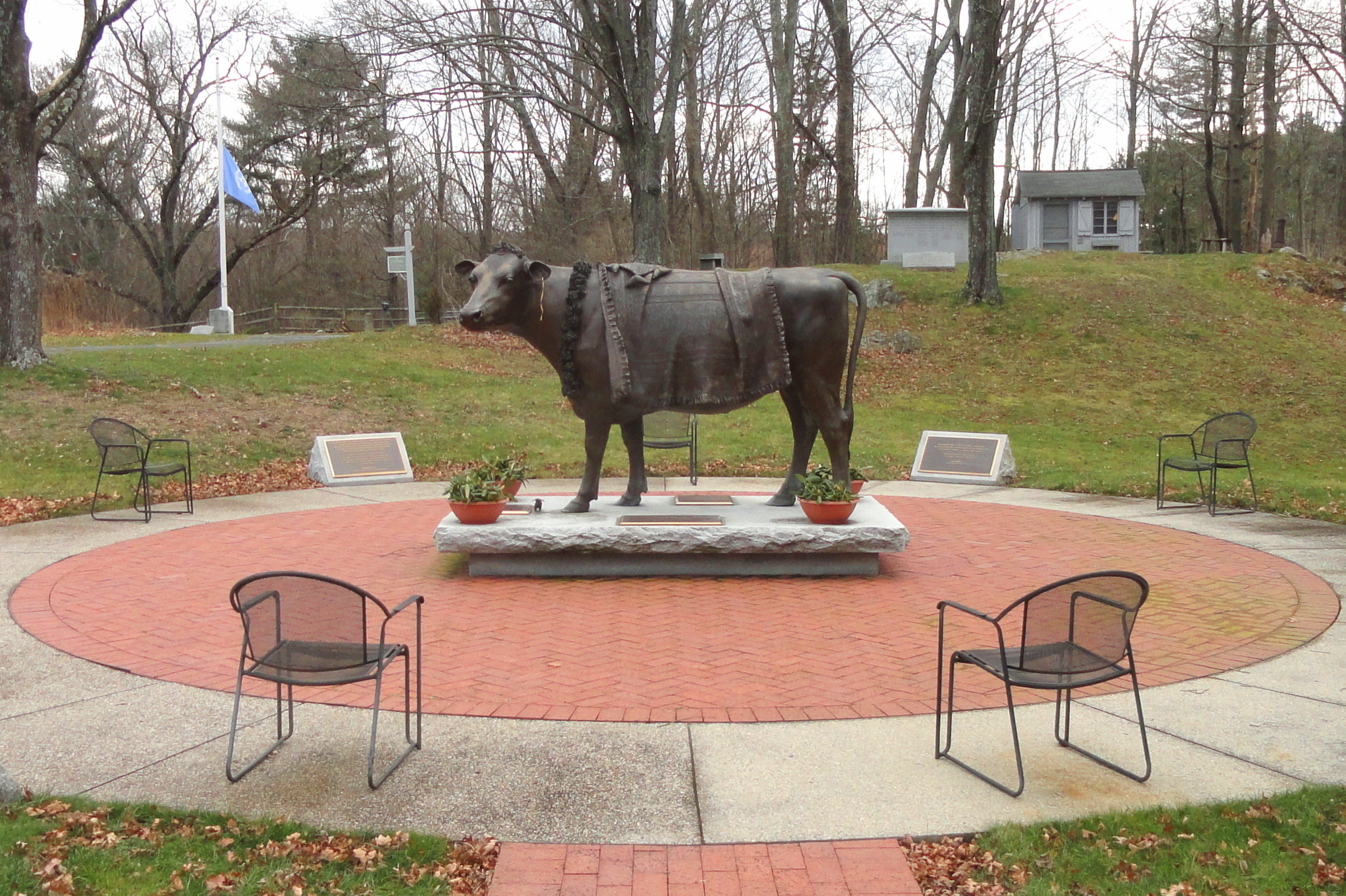
- The statue of Emily the Cow on her grave
- Species: Cattle
- Breed: Holstein Friesian
- Sex: Female
- Born: c. 1992; United States
- Died: March 30, 2003 (aged 10–11); Sherborn, Massachusetts, United States
- Resting place: Peace Abbey, Sherborn, Massachusetts, United States
- Occupation: Retired dairy cow
- Years active: 1995–2003
- Known for: Figurehead of animal rights and vegetarianism
- Owner: The Randa family
- Weight: 1600 lb (730 kg)
- Appearance: Black and white

Emily was a cow (Bos taurus) who escaped from a slaughterhouse in Hopkinton, Massachusetts in 1995 by jumping a gate and wandered for 40 days eluding capture. She found lasting refuge at the Peace Abbey in Sherborn, Massachusetts, until her death in 2003. During her 8 years' stay in the abbey, the cow became a figurehead of animal rights and vegetarianism.

The "Sacred Cow Animal Rights Memorial" was built on her grave with a life-sized statue of her.

== Escape from the slaughterhouse ==
On November 14, 1995, Emily, a three-year-old heifer weighing 1,600 pounds (730 kg), escaped from a slaughterhouse, A. Arena & Sons Inc, in Hopkinton by jumping a 5-foot (1.5 m) gate, minutes before she would have been killed. In record amounts of snow, Emily was spotted foraging through backyards for food. It was said that local townspeople helped the cow evade capture for 40 days. Elmwood Farm in Hopkinton, which donates produce to needy people in Worcester County, even started feeding her with crops produced on their land. Oftentimes, she was seen running with a herd of deer, which made headlines in local newspapers. After several failed attempts to capture the animal, the police had been ordered to shoot her on sight.

== Life at the Peace Abbey ==
Although the slaughterhouse set a bargain price of $350 on the cow initially, the cow was later purchased from the slaughterhouse by the Randa family for $1, who brought Emily to live in sanctuary at the Peace Abbey on Christmas Eve. When Emily was recaptured, she was found to have lost 500 pounds during her 40-day ordeal and was given veterinary treatment.

After her recapture, Emily became well known. During her stay at the Peace Abbey, Emily was visited by national and international visitors and soon became a representative of animal rights and vegetarianism. She even served as a bridesmaid in a couple of weddings. People even felt Emily's presence at the abbey and her story resonated with various religious and cultural traditions.

Within a year of Emily's arrival at the abbey, she was joined by a calf, a pair of turkeys, a mother goat with her two kids, and three rabbits, all of whom were rescued from slaughter and other inhumane conditions. In 1997, Ellen Little, producer of the 1995 film Richard III, began to work on a film on Emily's story.

== Death and memorial ==
Emily suffered from uterine cancer, possibly as a side-effect of rBGH from her days in the dairy farm, and died on March 30, 2003. A week before her death, Emily was visited and blessed by Krishna Bhatta, a local Hindu priest of the Lakshmi Temple in Ashland, Massachusetts, who placed a golden thread around her leg and one through the hole in her ear that once held the number tag when she arrived at the slaughterhouse.

Emily was buried at Peace Abbey on April 2, 2003, between statues of Mother Teresa and Mahatma Gandhi. Meg and Lewis Randa commissioned artist Lado Goudjabidze to sculpt a life-sized bronze statue of Emily, adorned with a blanket and flowers, Hindu signs of respect, to stand above her grave. The 2,300-pound statue was unveiled on Earth Day. The fiberglass cast used by the sculptor to make Emily's bronze figure is currently on display at the abbey.

After Emily's death, hair clippings from her markings on the forehead and from the tail tip, traces of her blood, and a piece of golden thread placed through her ear by the Hindu priest were released into the Ganges River at Benares, India, in April 2003.

In 2007, Lewis and Meg Randa compiled the life story of Emily into a 288-page book titled The Story of Emily the Cow: Bovine Bodhisattva, published by AuthorHouse, which collects local and national news coverage on Emily starting from her bid for freedom in 1995 to her death from cancer in 2004.

== Bibliography ==
- Randa, Lewis (2010). The Story of Emily the Cow: Bovine Bodhisattva. Preview in Google books
