= Kanichi Nagazawa =

Japanese World War II general (1891–1981)

- 長沢 貫一
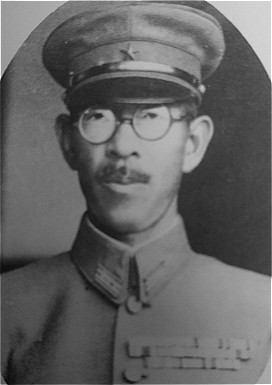
- Born: October 2, 1891; Kyoto, Japan
- Died: August 26, 1981 (aged 89); Tottori, Tottori Prefecture, Japan
- Education: Imperial Japanese Army Academy
- Military career
- Allegiance: Empire of Japan
- Branch: Imperial Japanese Army
- Service years: 1913–1945
- Rank: Major General (Rikugun-Shōshō)
- Units: IJA 54th Division; Tottori Regimental District; Southern Expeditionary Army Group
- Commands: 121st Infantry Regiment; 55th Infantry Regiment
- Conflicts: World War II; Burma campaign; Battle of Ramree Island

Kanichi Nagazawa (長沢 貫一, Nagazawa Kan'ichi; October 2, 1891 – August 26, 1981) was a Japanese major general who participated in World War II. During the war, he was known for being the main commander of the 121st Infantry Regiment and as the main commander and survivor of the Battle of Ramree Island.

== Biography ==
Nagazawa was born in Kyoto Prefecture on October 2, 1891. In May 1913, he graduated from the Imperial Japanese Army Academy, ranking 25th at his class. In December of the same year, he was appointed as an ensign.

In August 1931, he was promoted to major. In August 1935, he was appointed as a member of the Tottori Regimental District headquarters, and in August 1936, he was promoted to lieutenant colonel. In August 1940, he was promoted to colonel and was appointed commander of the 121st Infantry Regiment at the outbreak of the Pacific War. He subsequently participated in the Burma campaign and the Battle of Ramree Island. In February 1945, he was given command of the 55th Infantry Regiment and was promoted to major general in June of the same year. He was then transferred to the Southern Expeditionary Army Group and surrendered at Phnom Penh.

He died on August 26, 1981, at his home in Tottori due to a cerebral infarction.
