= Kentucky Reptile Zoo =

Zoo in Kentucky, United States

Coordinates: 37.7932°N 83.7039°W

Kentucky Reptile Zoo is a non-profit facility in Slade, Kentucky, that specializes in venomous reptiles and the acquisition of venom through a process called venom extraction. The venom is collected for use in medical research programs as well as for the production of anti-serum. The Kentucky Reptile Zoo is owned by Jim Harrison. The zoo has been featured on PBS, Animal Planet and National Geographic Channel.
