= Katherine Chappell =

American television editor

- Born: December 19, 1985; Rye, New York, United States
- Died: June 1, 2015 (aged 29); Lion Park, Gauteng, South Africa
- Cause of death: Lion attack
- Occupation: Visual effects editor

Katherine "Kate" Chappell (December 19, 1985 – June 1, 2015) was an American film visual effects editor who worked on Game of Thrones. On June 1, 2015, she died after being attacked by a lioness in South Africa.

== Biography ==
Chappell was born on December 19, 1985. She lived with her parents, Jonathan and Mary Elaine Chappell, two sisters and a brother in Westchester County, New York. She graduated from Hofstra University in Long Island. Chappell had lived in Vancouver since 2013. She was a visual effects editor of Game of Thrones, The Secret Life of Walter Mitty, Captain America: The Winter Soldier, Divergent, and Godzilla. Chappell was on the team that won a Primetime Emmy Award for the episode "The Children" in the fourth season of Game of Thrones.

== Death ==
On June 1, 2015, Chappell was visiting Johannesburg's Lion Park when, ignoring park rules, she rolled down her car's window to lean out and take photographs and was attacked by a lioness, which lunged into the vehicle, biting her on the neck. Chappell died in Lion Park of her wounds before the paramedics arrived. Chappell was visiting South Africa to work on the conservation of wildlife, and was raising funds for Wildlife ACT, a conservation charity.
