= Vitaly Nikolayenko =

Russian naturalist (1938–2003)

Vitaly Aleksandrovich Nikolayenko (Russian: Виталий Александрович Николаенко, transliteration: Vitálij Aleksándrovich Nikoláyenko, 1938 – December 2003) was a Russian self-educated natural scientist and photographer notable for his extensive research on the ethology of Russian bears. He spent 33 years living with the brown bears (Ursus arctos) native to the Kamchatka peninsula. He was found dead in December 2003 at the Kronotsky state reserve, one of two managed by the federal government, 177 km (110 mi) north of Petropavlovsk. Authorities concluded that the cause of death was an apparent bear mauling.

== Biography ==
A senior ranger on the Kronotsky Wildlife Reserve, Vitaly Nikolayenko battled illegal hunting and fishing in the reserve. His patrols kept him in the wilderness for months on end. He routinely spent each day from dawn to dusk following bears, documenting their feeding, mating, and social habits.

=== Interest in bears ===
He compiled one of the most exhaustive documentaries on the giant, 2.7-metre (9 ft) cousins of the North American grizzly bear, Kamchatka brown bears, regularly filling what became hundreds of journals, a body of work viewed as one of the most important biographical records of brown bear behaviour in existence.

Nikolayenko walked more than 1,000 km (620 mi) a year through the remote river valleys and coastal plains of Kamchatka, where approximately 15,000 brown bears are under increasing threat from foreign hunters and poachers. He documented an average of 800 bear contacts each year.

For over 20 years, Nikolayenko followed an enormous male he named Dobrynya, forming such an easy bond that the bear would often curl up to sleep just a few feet from him.

Nikolayenko also documented several lucky escapes during his time with the bears. He described how he had fallen down bluffs to avoid charging bears and been chased up trees.

He helped conduct an inquiry after Michio Hoshino, the renowned Japanese bear photographer, was pulled out of his tent and eaten by a bear in 1996 in the southern reserve, a more remote region neighbouring the 11,000 km^{2} (4,200 sq mi) Kronotsky state reserve where Nikolayenko was based.

=== Death ===
In the winter of 2003, Nikolayenko had been out in the wilderness much longer than planned, probably because not all of the bears had yet gone into hibernation. He had been waiting for a helicopter flight out of the reserve and was last heard from in late December 2003. When a helicopter did eventually arrive to pick him up, the crew found no sign of the researcher, and a search team was dispatched.

On 1 January 2004, Russian authorities announced that the body of Nikolayenko, 66, had been found at a lake near his remote one-room hut on the Tikhaya River. The 17-centimetre (6 1/2 in) pawprint of a medium-sized male bear was found next to his body, along with an empty can of pepper spray with which Nikolayenko had apparently tried to defend himself.

Victor Rebrikov, a tourist guide and longtime friend of Nikolayenko who was on the search team that found the body, said it appeared that Nikolayenko had followed a large male bear to the small, spring-fed lake that lies less than 2 km (1 mi) from the hut.

"Vitaly must have begun to take pictures of the resting bear, but the tree trunks and branches were in the way, and he must have decided to get inside the grove. His footprints lead into the grove after the bear. He approached the bear at a distance of three meters", Rebrikov said.

A large swath of orange pepper spray indicated that Nikolayenko tried to defend himself, and a flare gun was lying next to the body, unfired. His camera was broken and bloody nearby.

Just two months before, American bear researcher Timothy Treadwell and his girlfriend were killed and partially eaten by bears in the Alaska Katmai National Park.

== Controversy ==
Despite making a life's work of harassing poachers and monitoring bears, Nikolayenko was a polarising figure within the naturalist community, which had an institutionally unfavourable view of his proactive approach to monitoring bears. His overt familiarity with his subject went against the grain of the more passive method known in the field as "separation", which is largely the consensus in ethologist circles.

Nikolayenko insisted that he never underestimated the potential for ferocity amongst bears, and resisted the urge to ascribe human emotions to them. Even Dobrynya, he accepted, probably only tolerated his presence.

Nikolayenko's death was looked upon by his critics as confirmation of their position, and the bears who became habituated to his presence were easy pickings for poachers. At least 20 bears Nikolayenko knew were killed about seven months before his own death.

Nikolayenko also fought a war of words with the man with whom he probably had more in common than anyone in Kamchatka, Charlie Russell, a researcher who operated in the south Kamchatka reserve. Russell and Nikolayenko clashed when the Russian ranger was called in to review Russell's project.

Nikolayenko strongly objected to Russell's policy of feeding half-grown cubs, arguing that it rendered the research meaningless and had the potential to make the cubs dangerously eager for human handouts. Russell felt the cubs needed the kind of nourishment they would have received from their mother to make them strong enough to fend off predators. The men argued bitterly throughout their acquaintance.

== See also ==
- Timothy Treadwell
- List of unusual deaths in the 21st century
