= Surinder Singh Bajwa =

Indian politician (c. 1955–2007)

- Born: 1955
- Died: October 21, 2007 (aged 51–52); Delhi, India
- Occupation: Politician
- Known for: Deputy Mayor of Delhl, unusual circumstances of death
- Office: Deputy Mayor of Delhi
- Political party: Bharatiya Janata Party

Surinder Singh Bajwa (c. 1955 – 21 October 2007) was an Indian politician who served as the Deputy Mayor of Delhi and was a member of the Bharatiya Janata Party (BJP). He is best known for his role in the municipal politics of the National Capital Territory of Delhi and for the unusual and widely reported circumstances of his death in 2007, which occurred after an attack by monkeys at his residence.

== Political career ==
Bajwa was associated with the Bharatiya Janata Party (BJP). He was elected as a representative in the Municipal Corporation of Delhi, the then civic body responsible for the administration of large parts of Delhi. Bajwa rose to the position of Deputy Mayor of Delhi, a senior office within the MCD’s political structure.

== Circumstances of death ==
On 20 October 2007 Bajwa was attacked by a group of rhesus macaques at his home and fell from a first floor balcony, suffering serious head injuries. On 21 October 2007 he died from those injuries.
