= Lion & Safari Park =

Wildlife park in South Africa

Coordinates: 25°50′26.88″S 27°53′13.2″E

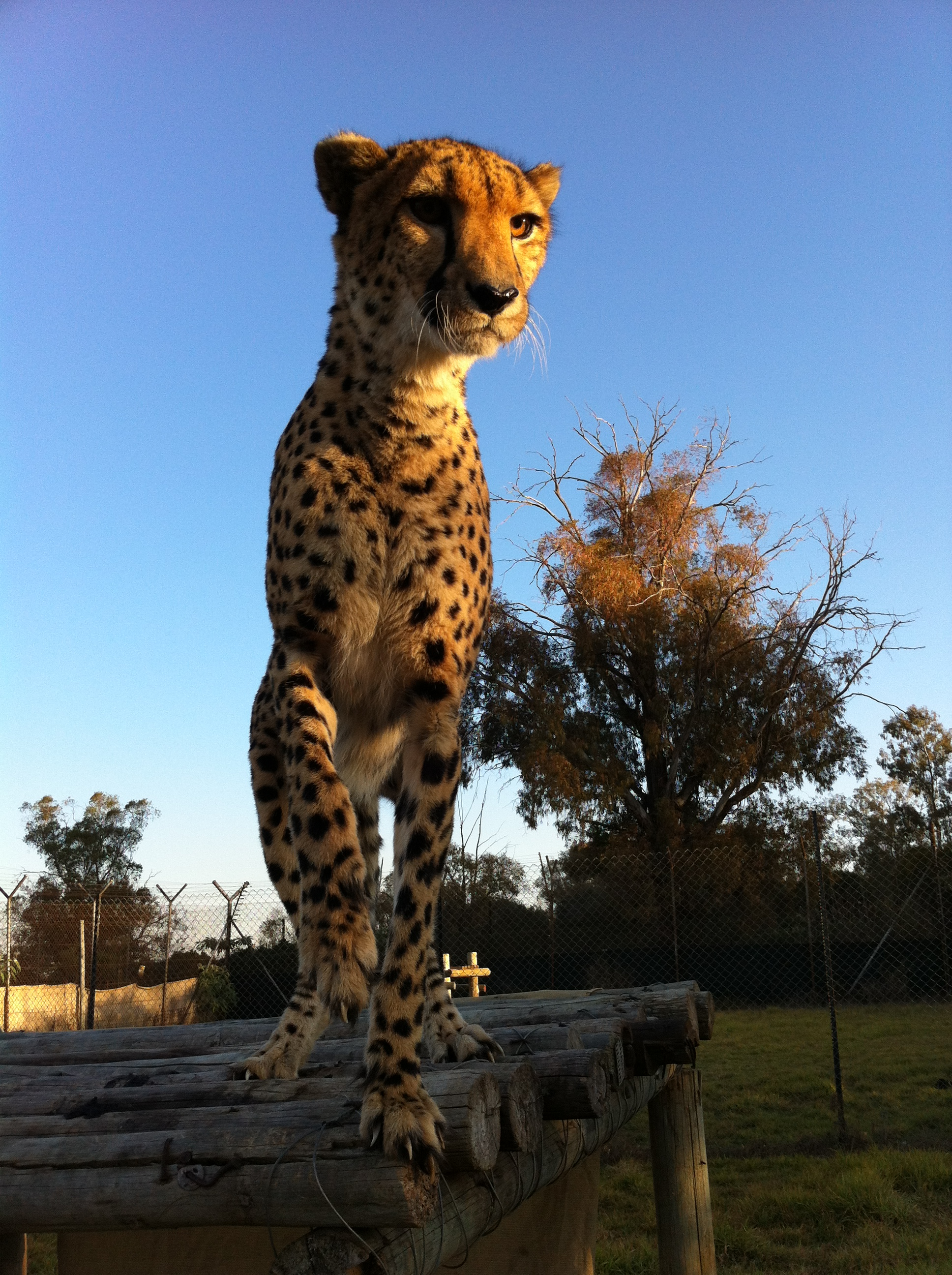
A South African cheetah in the original Lion Park.

Lion & Safari Park is a conservation enclosure for lions, cheetahs, hyena, wild dogs and various antelope. It is located in the Cradle of Humankind in the North West province of South Africa.

== The park ==
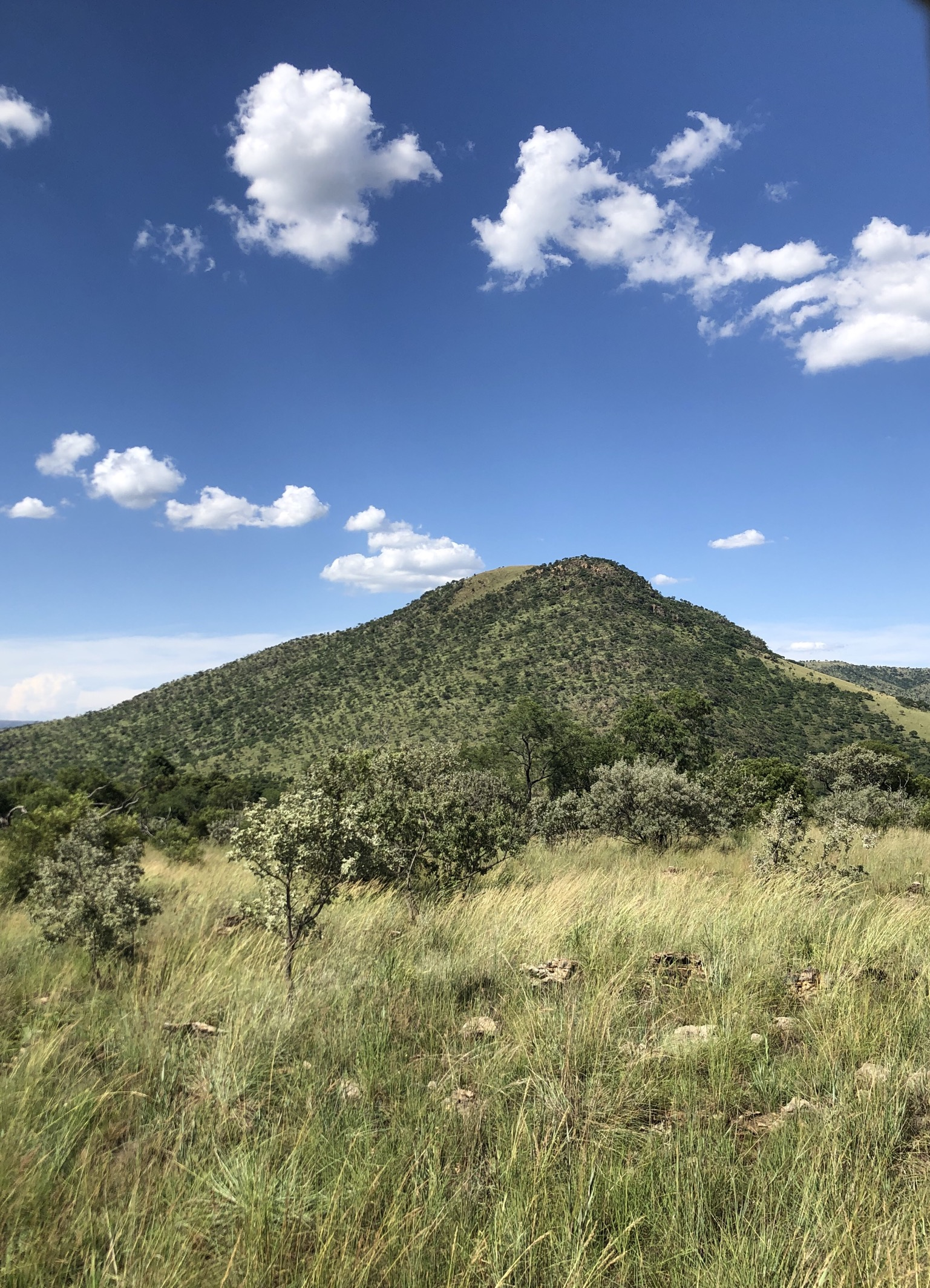
Landscape in Lion Park

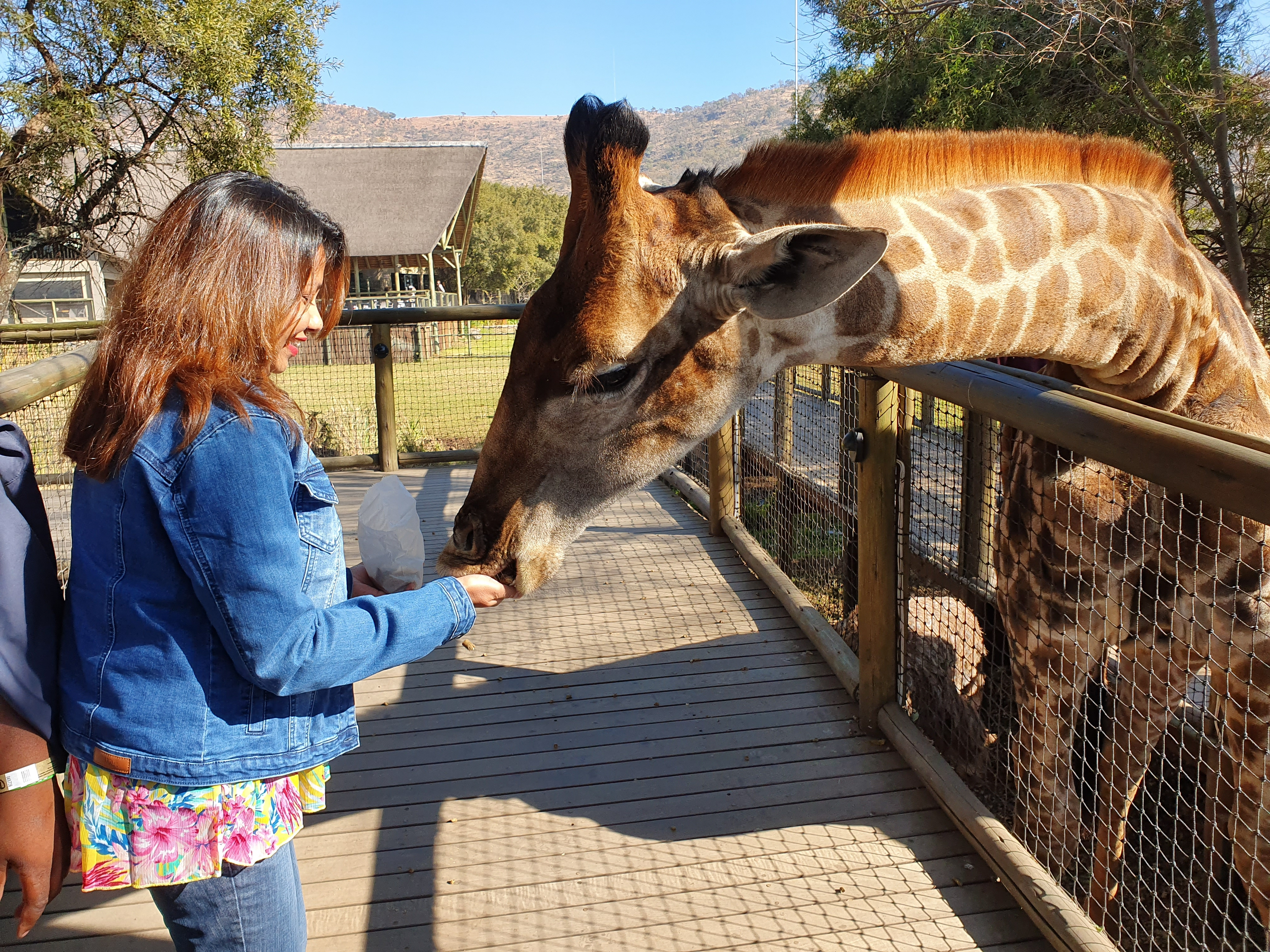
Feeding a giraffe

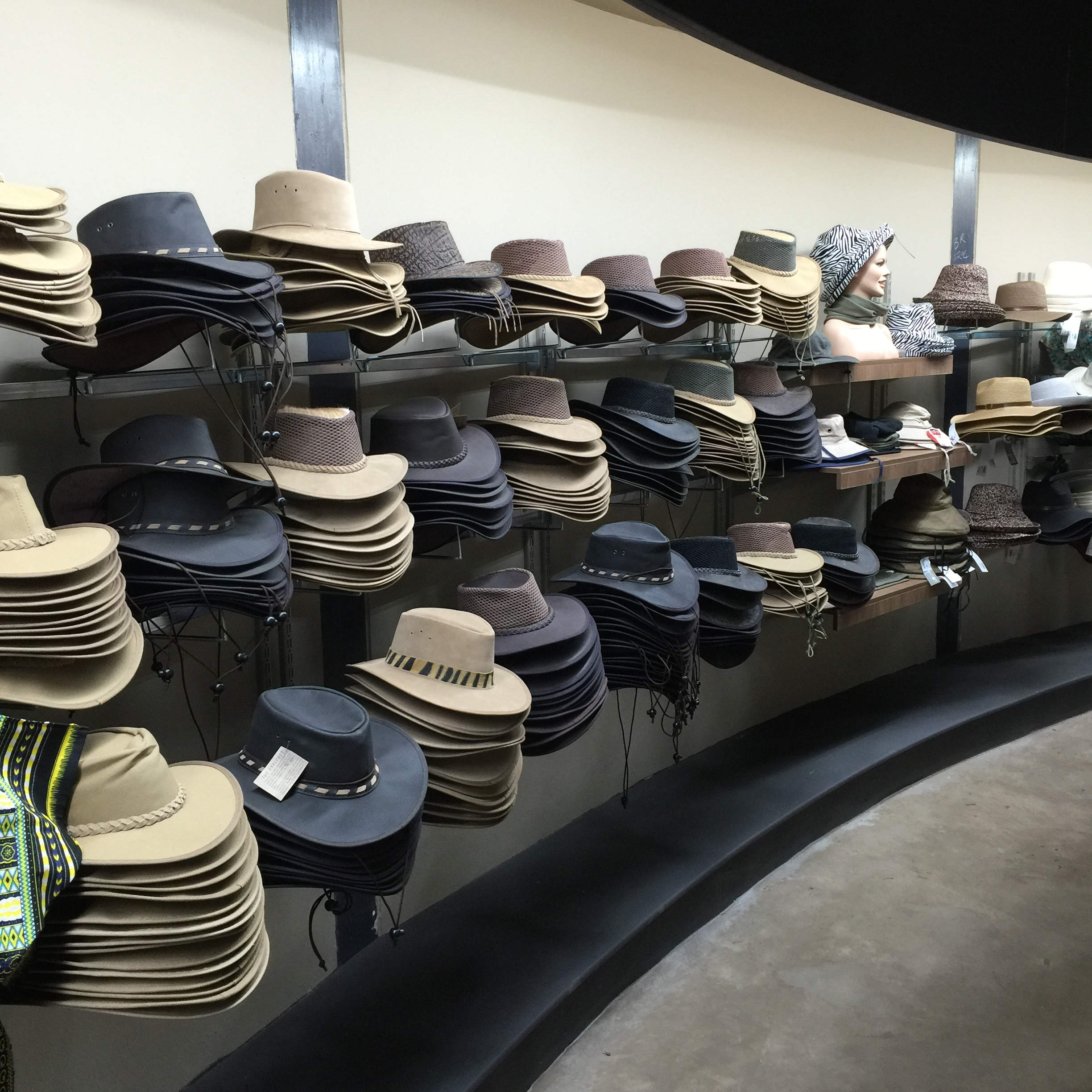
One store within the Lion and Safari park

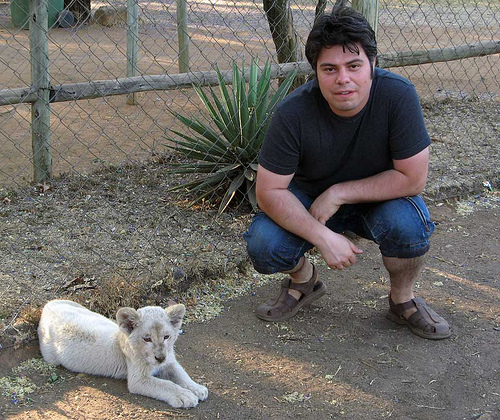
Cub interactions at the Lion and Safari Park

The Lion & Safari Park was originally a wildlife conservation enclosure for lions located in the Gauteng province in South Africa. In 2016, the park relocated to new premises of 600 hectare (ca. 1,500 acre) in the Cradle of Humankind in the North West province. The park is situated north of Lanseria Airport within driving distance of Johannesburg and Pretoria. It has a large variety of predators and large herbivores indigenous to Africa.

The Lion & Safari Park is home to over 80 lions including the rare white lions and many other carnivores such as South African cheetah, Cape wild dog, brown hyena and spotted hyena, black-backed jackal, and a wide variety of antelope which roam freely in the antelope area.

The antelope area, containing giraffe, warthog, blesbok, wildebeest, impala, gemsbok, and zebra, is a separate area away from the lions and other carnivores.

In addition to the animal enclosures the new park has a children's play area, restaurants, conference facilities and a retail centre within five small domes. Guests are also able to hand-feed giraffes, ostriches and antelope.

Twice a day the park also offers Lion walks and Cheetah walks in which clients, in the company of a park employee, follow the animal for a short walk within the park.

=== Cub interactions ===
Cub interactions involve the clients being in a separate enclosure with a lion cub for a short period of time during which photos can be taken and minimal interaction with the animal is possible.

In 2015 the Lion & Safari Park banned cub interactions but found that visitor numbers dropped dramatically as people were going to other places that still offered cub interactions. In 2016 cub interactions were re-introduced as an additional part of a guided tour at the new premises of the park. The CEO, Rodney Fuhr, said that they had no choice since the "survival of our business will be at stake."

Non-profit organisation, Blood Lions, which is opposed to the exploitation of lions in any form, condemned the park and those who chose to visit it for the cub interactions. The park believes that they are managing the interactions with the cubs in a way that will not have a negative impact on the cubs.

They do not offer lion cub interaction anymore.

== Attack ==
On June 1, 2015, Katherine Chappell was visiting the original location of the park in the company of a tour operator, Pierre Potgieter of Kalabash tours. Chappell had opened her window and leant out to take photographs, against park rules, when a lion lunged through the window of the vehicle and bit her on the neck. Chappell died in the Lion Park of her wounds before the paramedics arrived. Potgieter fought off the lion and suffered injuries to his arms and an unconfirmed heart attack.

Chappell had been visiting South Africa to work on the conservation of wildlife, and was raising funds for Wildlife ACT, a conservation charity.

Unfortunately, this attack was not an isolated incident. In April 2015, an Australian named Brendan Smith, was attacked by a lion when he opened his car window. Smith survived the attack and later admitted that he was at fault for opening his window.

Two days after the Australian incident a local boy rode through the park on his bicycle after having cut a hole in the fence. He was attacked by a cheetah but also survived.
