= Ali Khan Samsudin =

Malaysian snake charmer (1958–2006)

Ali Khan Samsudin (January 3, 1958 – December 1, 2006 in Kuala Lumpur) was a snake charmer known as Malaysia's "Snake King". He earned the title after living with 400 cobras, for 12 hours a day for 40 days, in a small room in the early 1990s. He also earned the title of "Scorpion King" after his feat of living in a glass enclosure with 6,000 scorpions for 21 days, which is listed in the 1998 Guinness Book of World Records.

He had a protégé, Nur Malena Hassan, who went on to complete her own record-breaking stunts, and who is now known as the "Scorpion Queen".

== Death ==
Ali Khan died on December 1, 2006, after being bitten by a king cobra during a performance.

He left his two wives and five children.

== See also ==
- List of entertainers who died during a performance
- Boonreung Buachan, Thai snake charmer who died of a cobra bite during a performance in 2004
