= Battle of Ramree Island =

Battle of World War II in Burma

- Part of The Burma campaign
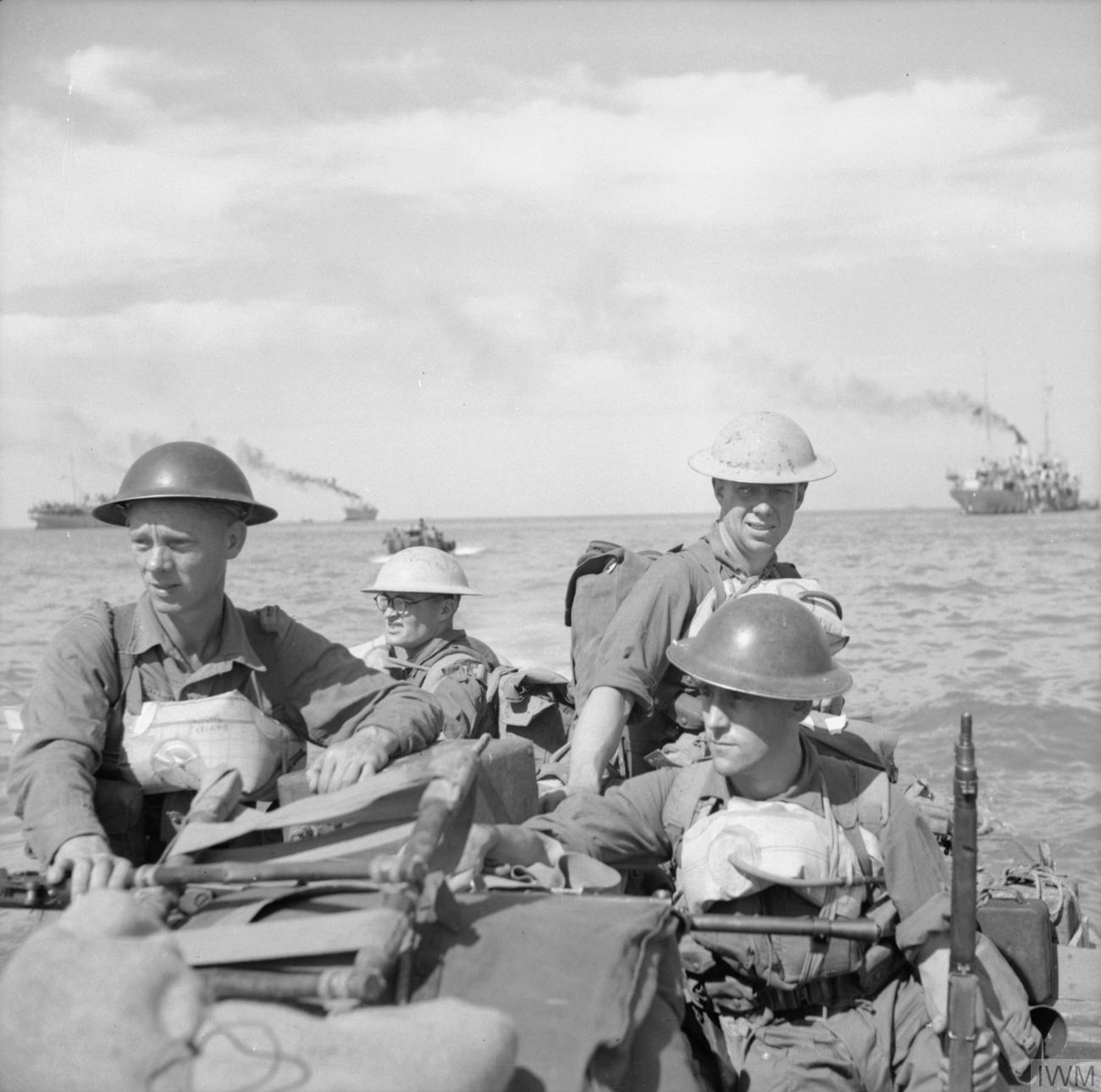
- British troops in landing craft make their way ashore on Ramree Island, 21 January 1945.
Date	14 January – 22 February 1945
Location	Ramree Island, Arakan, Burma 19°06′N 93°48′E
Result	British victory

Belligerents
United Kingdom: India	Japan

Commanders and leaders
Cyril Lomax	Kan'ichi Nagazawa

Units involved
Two brigades, 26th Indian Infantry Division; 1 Squadron, 146 Regt, RAC; Elements 3 Commando Brigade	2nd Battalion, 121st Regiment, 54th Division

Strength
c. 6,000	c. 1,000

Casualties and losses
"Trifling"	c. 500 killed; 20 captured; c. 500 evacuated to mainland
- Burma (Myanmar)

The Battle of Ramree Island (Burmese: ရမ်းဗြဲကျွန်း တိုက်ပွဲ), also known as Operation Matador, took place from 14 January to 22 February 1945, in the Second World War as part of the offensive on the Southern Front in the Burma campaign and was conducted by the XV Indian Corps.

Ramree Island, part of Arakan (now Rakhine State), has an area of 520 sq mi (1,350 km^{2}) and is separated from the mainland by a strait with an average width of about 490 ft (150 m); the island is 70 mi (110 km) south of Akyab (now Sittwe). During the Japanese invasion of Burma in early 1942, the Island had been captured. In January 1945, forces of the Indian XV Corps landed on Ramree and the neighbouring island of Cheduba, to establish airfields for the supply of the mainland campaign.

The battle is known for claims that hundreds of Japanese soldiers were killed by crocodiles in the mangrove swamps of Ramree. Some editions of the Guinness Book of World Records have described this as the highest number of fatalities in an animal attack; zoologists and modern military historians have dismissed these claims.

== Background ==
The early capture of Akyab made the 26th Indian Infantry Division (Major-General Henry Chambers) available for an attack on Ramree Island, 70 mi (110 km) to the south, the island being 50 mi (80 km) long and 20 mi (32 km) wide, flat and an obvious site for airfields. A plan was ready by 2 January, when it was clear that the advance of the Fourteenth Army (Lieutenant-General William Slim) into Central Burma would soon pass beyond the range of its airbases at Imphal and Agartala; replacements at Chittagong, Akyab and Ramree would be needed.

On 14 January, the 26th Indian Division was ordered to attack Ramree on 21 January, as a Royal Marine detachment from 3 Commando Brigade occupied the neighbouring Cheduba Island. The Japanese garrison of Ramree consisted of the II Battalion, 121st Infantry Regiment (Colonel Kan'ichi Nagazawa), part of the 54th Division, with artillery and engineer detachments to act as an independent force.

== Prelude ==
The battle started with Operation Matador, an amphibious assault to capture the strategic port of Kyaukpyu at the north end of Ramree Island and the airfield near the port, south of Akyab across Hunter's Bay. The invasion force was led by three Joint Assault Commanders, Captain Bush RN, Major-General Cyril Lomax and Wing Commander H. Smith. Reconnaissance carried out on 14 January 1945, found that Japanese forces were placing artillery in caves overlooking the landing beaches on Ramree and the Royal Navy assigned the battleship HMS Queen Elizabeth, the escort carrier HMS Ameer, the light cruiser HMS Phoebe, the destroyers HMS Rapid, Napier, HMAS Norman and Pathfinder, with the sloops Flamingo and HMIS Kistna.

The large number of ships was intended to provide more firepower in support of the landing force. On 21 January, an hour before the 71st Indian Infantry Brigade (Brigadier R. C. Cotterell-Hill) was to land, Queen Elizabeth opened fire with 69 rounds of 15 in (380 mm)-shell from the main battery, the fall of shot being watched by aircraft from Ameer. Phoebe also joined the bombardment, along with Consolidated B-24 Liberators, North American B-25 Mitchells and Republic P-47 Thunderbolts of 224 Group Royal Air Force (RAF), under the command of HQ RAF Bengal and Burma, that strafed and bombed the beaches.

== Battle ==
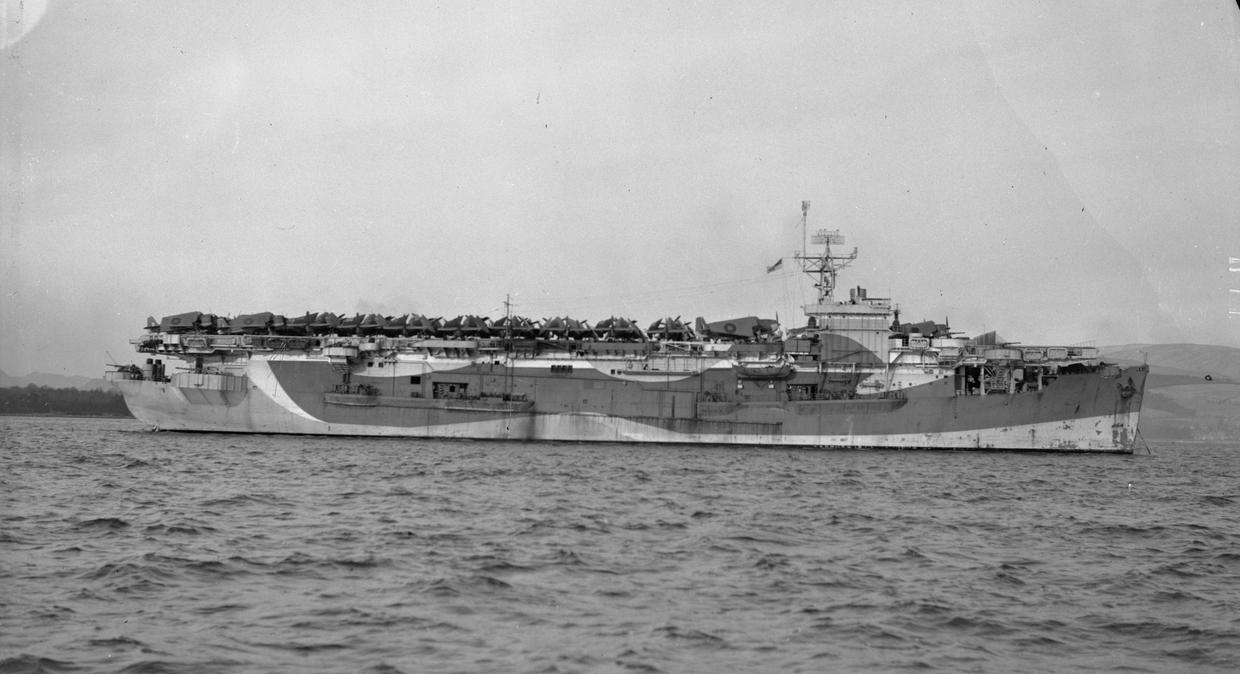
The escort carrier HMS Ameer

The assault troops were slightly delayed when a motor launch and a landing craft struck mines but landed unopposed on the beaches west of Kyaukpyu at 9:42 a.m., securing the beachhead by the afternoon. The following day, the 4th Indian Infantry Brigade (Brigadier J. F. R. Forman) landed, took over the beachhead and occupied Kyaukpyu. On 23 January, the 71st Infantry Brigade advanced southwards, down the west coast. Two days later Mayin was occupied and the troops reached the Yanbauk Chaung the next day. Resistance at the chaung from the troops of the II Battalion, 121st Regiment increased and on 31 January, the 71st Brigade was ordered to move inland, north-east towards Sane, then head south towards Ramree town. The 4th Brigade was to keep the defenders at Yanbauk Chaung under pressure and follow up vigorously should they retire.

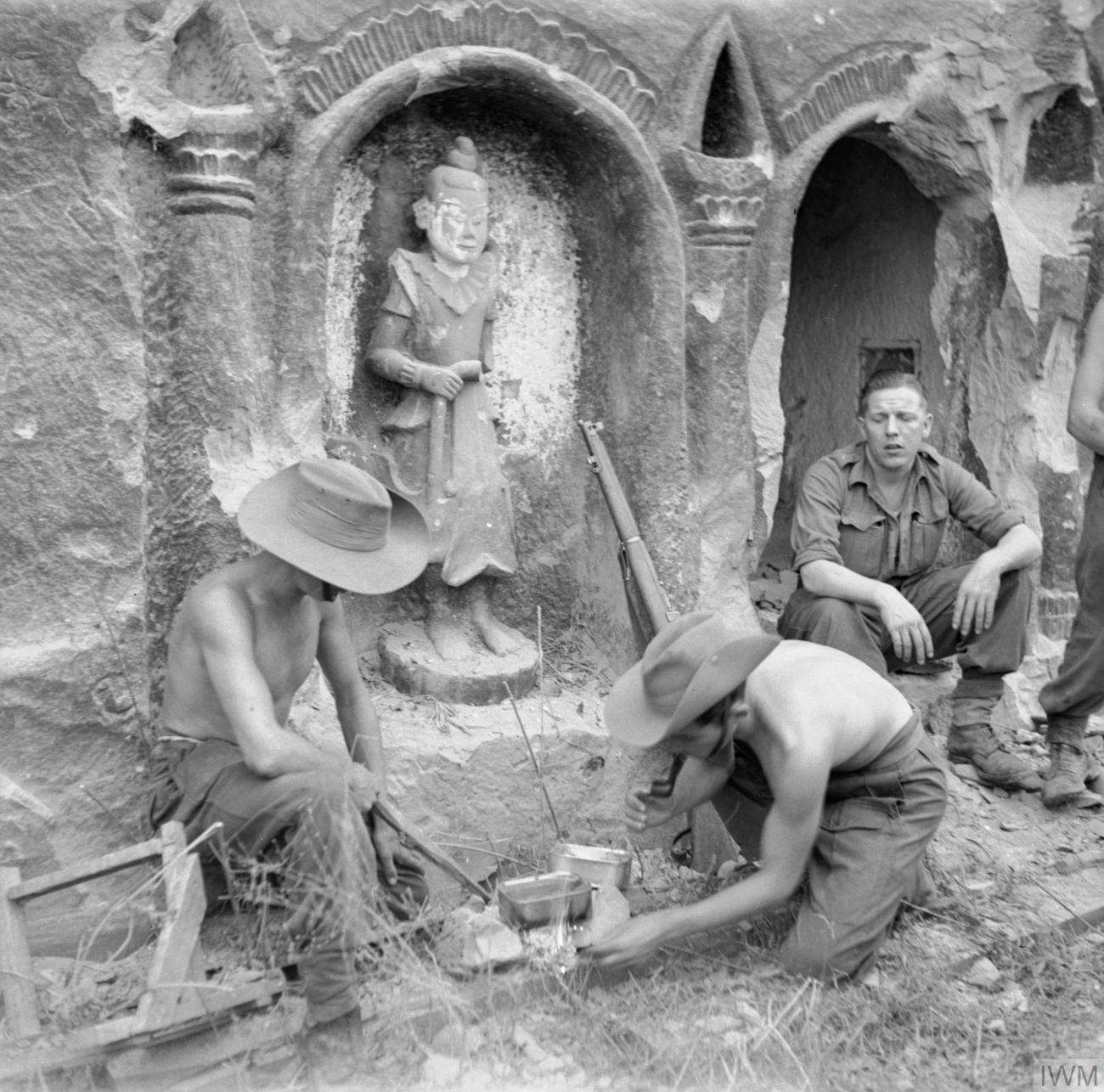
Men of the Wiltshire Regiment from the 26th Indian Infantry Division prepare a meal beside a temple on Ramree Island.

On 26 January in Operation Sankey, a Royal Marine force landed on Cheduba island, about 6.2 mi (10 km) offshore of the south-west coast of Ramree Island and found it unoccupied. On Ramree, the Japanese garrison resisted with great determination but on 1 February, the 71st Indian Infantry Brigade reached Sane and parts of the 36th Indian Infantry Brigade, from reserve, took Sagu Kuyun Island and relieved the marines on Cheduba Island. When the British outflanked a Japanese stronghold, the 900 defenders abandoned the base and marched to join a larger force of Japanese soldiers across the island. The route took the Japanese through 9.9 mi (16 km) of mangrove swamp and as they struggled through it, the British encircled the area. Trapped in deep mud-filled land, tropical diseases soon started to afflict the soldiers, as did scorpions, tropical mosquitoes and saltwater crocodiles.

On 7 February, the 71st Indian Infantry Brigade and supporting tanks reached the town of Ramree and encountered determined Japanese resistance. The 4th Indian Infantry Brigade had advanced to Ledaung Chaung and then moved east to reinforce the attack; the town fell on 9 February. The navy and the 26th Indian Infantry Division then concentrated on blockading the chaungs (small streams) on the east coast, to prevent the Japanese from escaping to the mainland. A Japanese air raid on 11 February seriously damaged a destroyer with a near miss and forty small craft were sent by the Japanese from the mainland to rescue the survivors of the garrison. Japanese resistance on the island ended on 17 February and the Allied blockade was maintained until 22 February, sinking many of the rescue craft and inflicting many casualties on the Japanese troops hiding in the mangrove swamps; about 500 troops managed to get away. Cheduba Island was not garrisoned and the 22nd East African Brigade was sent to hold Ramree Island.

== Aftermath ==
=== Analysis ===
In 1965, the British official historian, Stanley Woodburn Kirby, wrote that the Japanese defence of the island and the escape of about 500 men against "fearful odds", had been courageous and determined. It took until 16 April for the airfield to be used for transport sorties, Akyab having come into use on 1 April. It had been vital to complete the occupation of Ramree Island quickly, as Operation Dracula against Rangoon needed to commence in the first week of May at the latest, to have a chance of finishing before the monsoon. The experience in co-operation between the 26th Indian Division and the navy in the war of chaungs and small ports along the Arakan coast was intended to be exploited in the attack. An estimate put naval gunfire support from 4 January to 13 March for the land operations at Akyab, Ramree and Cheduba at 23,000 shells. The navy also carried 54,000 men, 1,000 vehicles, 14,000 long tons (14,000 t) of stores and 800 animals.

=== Casualties ===
In the 1965 edition of the British official history, Woodburn Kirby wrote that the Japanese force suffered about 500 men killed and 20 men taken prisoner; British losses were "trifling".

=== Alleged crocodile attacks ===
On 24 February 1945, Reuters war correspondents reported that Japanese soldiers trying to escape Ramree Island were "being forced by hunger out of the mangrove swamps and many have been killed by crocodiles". In his 1962 collection Wildlife Sketches Near and Far, the Canadian naturalist and veteran of the Burma campaign, Bruce Wright, described the events of the battle, focusing on predation of the Japanese soldiers by the saltwater crocodiles.

That night [19 February 1945] was the most horrible that any member of the M. L. [motor launch] crews ever experienced. The scattered rifle shots in the pitch black swamp punctured by the screams of wounded men crushed in the jaws of huge reptiles, and the blurred worrying sound of spinning crocodiles made a cacophony of hell that has rarely been duplicated on earth. At dawn the vultures arrived to clean up what the crocodiles had left (...) Of about one thousand Japanese soldiers that entered the swamps of Ramree, only about twenty were found alive.

Other writers, including Roger Caras, in his 1964 Dangerous to Man, repeated Wright's version, with Caras stating "had the story come from a source other than Bruce Wright, I would be tempted to discount it". The story was incorporated into the Guinness Book of World Records as the worst animal attack ever recorded, due to Wright's statement that "[o]f about one thousand Japanese soldiers that entered the swamps of Ramree, only about twenty were found alive".

The presence of crocodiles in the Ramree swamps led other servicemen stationed on the island to believe they were significant in the battle, with one British soldier writing in his diary that "[w]hen the Army landed they drove the Japanese into the swamps and the crocodiles killed hundreds of them. They used to call the crocodiles the allies". In his memoir, An Odyssey in War and Peace, Lieutenant-General Jack Jacob (Indian Army) recounted his experiences during the battle,

Over a 1,000 soldiers of the Japanese garrison retreated into the crocodile-infested mangrove swamps. We went in with boats and interpreters using loudhailers asking them to come out. Not a single one did. Salt-water crocodiles, some of them well over 20 ft (6.1 m) long frequented these waters. It is not difficult to imagine what happened to the Japanese who took refuge in the mangroves!

In 2006, Robert Duff, formerly of the 26th Division, recorded an oral history for the BBC, "after a few weeks we managed to push [the Japanese] to the swamp on the other side of the island, which was full of crocodiles. They decided to take their chances in the swamp rather than surrender. Only a handful came out alive".

In his 2011 analysis of the Burma campaign, the historian Frank McLynn challenged this interpretation, saying,

Most of all, there is a single zoological problem. If 'thousands of crocodiles' were involved in the massacre, as in the urban (jungle) myth, how had these ravening monsters survived before and how were they to survive later? The ecosystem of a mangrove swamp, with an exiguous mammal life, simply would not have permitted the existence of so many saurians before the coming of the Japanese (animals are not exempt from the laws of overpopulation and starvation).

In 1974, a journalist, George Frazier, reported having asked the Japanese War Office about the crocodile attack and being told that they could not confirm that it had happened. In 2016, Sam Willis, a historian, reported that he had found documents indicating that the Japanese soldiers mostly drowned and/or were shot and that crocodiles scavenged on their corpses afterwards.

In 2000, a herpetologist, Steven Platt, visited Ramree Island, where he interviewed residents who had been alive during the war and who had been forced into slave labour by the Japanese; they "unanimously discounted any suggestion that large numbers of Japanese fell prey to crocodiles". Platt found that "[t]he only crocodile-related deaths occurred when 10 to 15 soldiers were killed trying to ford Min Chaung, a tidal creek" and he concluded that although the deaths of nearly 1,000 Japanese soldiers during the Battle of Ramree Island are "well documented and undisputed", there is "little need to invoke crocodile predation".

Platt published a historiographical analysis of the allegations of the crocodile attack. He established that Bruce Wright had not been on Ramree Island during the battle and noted that although the other chapters in Wright's book were told in the first person, the account of the battle was in the third person; possibly, Platt speculated, Wright was repeating stories he had been told by friends. Platt also noted that Wright did not "attribute the majority of Japanese casualties to crocodile predation" but wrote that only 20 out of 1,000 Japanese soldiers survived the battle, with crocodiles being "just one of many hazards".

Platt's findings are similar to sections of Wright's 1968 book, The Frogmen of Burma, which chronicled his experiences commanding the Sea Reconnaissance Unit (SRU). In the memoir, Wright described how he arrived on Ramree after the main battle had been concluded. Interviewing other members of the SRU, Wright reported that two of the men abandoned their paddleboards during the battle and climbed up a mangrove tree to avoid a crocodile. There, they "heard shouting and rifle fire during the night" far from the Allied position; "vultures often appeared over areas [British] forces had never reached...." Wright concluded the Japanese did not die from crocodiles alone but also from "thirst" and "wounds".
