= 7th Light Cavalry =

Indian Army regiment

- Active: 1784–present
- Country: India
- Allegiance: British India; India
- Branch: British Indian Army; Indian Army
- Type: Cavalry
- Size: Regiment
- Equipment: T-90
- Engagements: Third Mysore War; Fourth Mysore War; Pindari War; World War I World War II
- Battle honours: Mysore; Seringapatam; Mahidpur; Merv; Persia-1915; Imphal; Battle of Kyaukmyaung Bridgehead; Meiktila; Mandalay; Operation Dracula (Rangoon Road); Srinagar; Zojila

Commanders
- Colonel of the Regiment: Lieutenant General Rajesh Pushkar
- Notable commanders: Maj Gen Muhammed Iftikhar Khan, Gen JN Chaudhuri, Maj Gen Rajinder Singh Sparrow, Lt Gen Kamal Davar, Lt Gen Ajay Kumar Singh, Lt Gen Ashok Bhim Shivane

The 7th Light Cavalry, previously the 28th Light Cavalry, was a regular army cavalry regiment in the British Indian Army. It was raised in 1784 by the East India Company. The regiment later saw service on the North West Frontier and in World War I and World War II. In 1947, it was allocated to the new Indian Army, where it continues to exist as the 7th Light Cavalry

== History ==
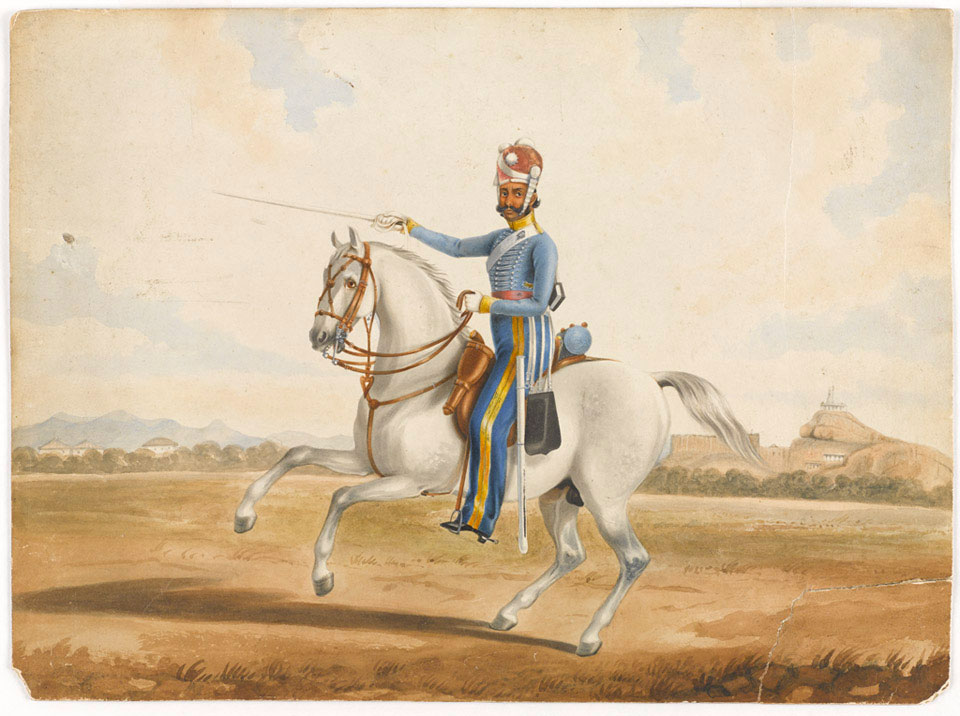
c. 1847 painting of a Madras Light Cavalry sowar

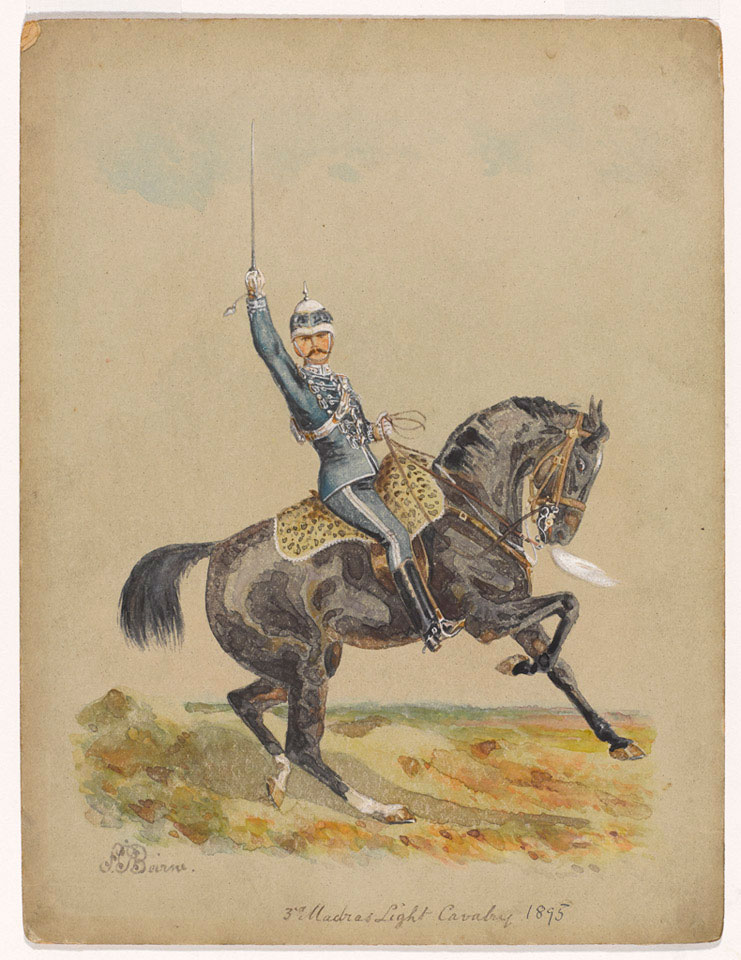
1895 illustration of a 3rd Madras Light Cavalry officer

=== Formation and early history ===
The history of this regiment can be traced to 1784 when a force of cavalry was hired from the Nawab of Arcot by the East India Company. These regiments subsequently mutinied over pay issues. The regiments involved were disbanded and from their remnants, volunteers formed the 2nd Madras Cavalry. This new regiment would eventually become the 7th Light Cavalry.

The title was first changed to that of 3rd Madras Native Cavalry. Under this designation the regiment first saw action during the Third Mysore War in 1790, against Tipu Sultan.

The regiment was next in action during the Fourth Mysore War in 1799. It subsequently fought with distinction at the Battle of Seringapatam and at the Battle of Mahidpur in the Pindari War of 1817, after which it was renamed the 3rd Madras Light Cavalry. For these actions the regiment was awarded the battle honors Mysore, Seringapatam and Mahidipore.

The regiment was subsequently involved in several minor operations against the southern Mahrattas from 1844 to 1855. A detachment of the 3rd Madras Light Cavalry was then sent to join the Deccan Horse during the Mutiny of 1857. During the remainder of the 19th century the regiment did not see any action.

In 1891 the regiment was converted to lancers, becoming the 3rd Regiment of Madras Lancers. In the reorganisation of the Indian Army of 1903, their title was changed to the 28th Light Cavalry. During this time the class composition of the regiment was 33% Tamils from Madras Presidency, 33% Sikhs and 34% Jats.

=== World War I ===
At the start of World War I, the regiment was stationed in Quetta as part of the 4th (Quetta) Division.

In July 1915 two squadrons were sent to Persia where they were mounted on camels. In this role they were tasked with stopping German agents from traveling across Persia to Afghanistan. The remainder of the regiment was posted to Persia in November 1915.

The regiment's effectiveness in Persia was demonstrated when a detachment captured a German officer, Lieutenant Winkleman, who was attempting to reach the Amir of Afghanistan to convince him to rebel or start a Jihad, against the British in India.

==== Russia ====
Following the Russian Revolution the regiment was sent to Trans-Caspasia in May 1918 to assist the White Russian Menshevik forces to fight the Bolsheviks. In April 1919 the regiment returned to Meshed in Persia, where it stayed for seven months employed in escorting convoys. In November 1919 the regiment started back for India and reached Lucknow in February 1920.

The regiment received the battle honors Merv and Persia 1915 for their services in the Great War.

=== Interwar period ===
In 1921 the 28th Light Cavalry left Lucknow for Dera Ismail Khan on the North West Frontier.

In 1922 another reorganization saw the regiment renamed as the 7th Light Cavalry and the class composition was altered. The current class composition of the regiment is two squadron Jats and one squadron sikh.

From 1924 to 1929 it was stationed at Bolarum, followed by Sialkot, then Jullunder until October 1933. The regiment then moved to Loralai in Baluchistan. It stayed there until October 1935 before moving back to Bolarum where it was stationed at the start of the Second World War.

The same year the ‘Indianization’ of the Indian Army officer corps began in selected regiments. Initially in the cavalry the two units selected were the 7th Light Cavalry and the 16th Light Cavalry. Under this policy British officers would no longer be appointed to the regiment. Instead newly commissioned Indian officers, initially trained at Royal Military College, Sandhurst and from 1932 onwards at the Indian Military Academy, Dehradun, would be appointed instead. The first Indian officer was appointed in December 1923. By September 1939, 16 of the 22 officers of the regiment were Indian.

=== World War II ===
At the start of the Second World War the regiment was stationed in Bolarum as part of the 4th (Secunderabad) Cavalry Brigade. The 7th Light Cavalry were brigaded with the:

- 14th/20th Hussars
- Prince Albert Victor's Own Cavalry
- 3rd Field Regiment, Royal Artillery
- 4th Cavalry Brigade Signal Troop.

The last mounted parade of the 7th Light Cavalry took place in 1940. However even by early 1941 the only mechanical transport provided for the now dismounted regiment was an Austin car for the commandant and a few motorbikes for dispatch riders. Vehicles trickled in and finally a full complement of 52 Stuart tanks was received by April 1943.

The regiment was then attached to the 254th Indian Tank Brigade, in November 1941.

The brigade came under the command of Brigadier Reginald Scoones. When it was moved to Imphal in November and December 1943 the 254th Indian Tank Brigade consisted of the following major units:

- 7th Light Cavalry
- 3rd Carabiniers
- 3rd Btn 4th Bombay Grenadiers

The brigade served with the 5th Indian Division and the 7th Indian Infantry Divisions in Burma. It participated in the Battle of Imphal, Battle of Kyaukmyaung Bridgehead, Battle of Meiktila, and Operation Dracula (Rangoon Road).

In June 1945 the 7th Light Cavalry sailed from Rangoon to Madras and by July was stationed at Ahmednagar.

In August 1945 it was selected to form part of the British Indian Division (BRINDIV) This division served with the British Commonwealth Occupation Forces (BCOF) as part of the Allied Occupation Forces in Japan. The move to Japan occurred during March/April 1946. The regiment returned to India in August 1947.

=== Post war ===
In 1947 the regiment passed to the independent nation of India. The Muslim squadron was transferred to the new Army of Pakistan, to be replaced by a Jat squadron from another unit of the former British Indian Army. The 7th Light Cavalry now consisted of two Jat squadrons and one Sikh squadron.

Indo-Pakistani War of 1947–1948

Following the occupation of Gilgit on 2 November 1947, the Pakistani irregulars captured Kargil and Drass in May 1948. Leh finally fell in August 1948. Zoji La situated at a height of 11,575 feet was the gateway to the Ladakh. Pakistani forces had well entrenched themselves with artillery guns and heavy weaponry and were is a strong position. Two separate attacks in September 1948 by 77 (Para) Brigade supported by artillery and air support were beaten back with heavy casualties and Zojila appeared impregnable. A decision to employ the Stuart light tanks of 7th Light Cavalry under its commanding officer Lt Col Rajinder Singh ‘Sparrow’ along with the infantry proved decisive. The tanks under its squadron commander Captain Sharakdev Singh Jamwal supported by the infantry units (1/5 GR, 1 Patiala and 4 Rajput) led to the capture of this strategic pass on 2 November 1948. This paved the way for 77 (Para) Brigade to advance and capture Kargil and effect a link-up with Leh on 23–24 November 1948. Lt Col Rajinder Singh ‘Sparrow’ was awarded the Maha Vir Chakra.

Annexation of Goa

The Stuart light tanks of the 7th Light Cavalry and the 8th Light Cavalry took part in the ground invasion of Goa on the Betim and Usgao axis in 1961. It also seized Aguada Fort and freed its political prisoners.

Sino-Indian War

The Stuart light tanks of the Regiment saw action in Bomdila and Tenga under 48 Infantry Brigade. Other squadrons of the Regiment joined 4 Infantry Division at Dirang and 62 Infantry Brigade at Se La.

Indo-Pakistani War of 1965

7th Light Cavalry was the first Indian Army unit to receive PT-76s (in late August 1965). The tanks saw action in the Western sector.

Indo-Pakistani War of 1971

No.1 Independent Squadron of the 7th Light Cavalry with its PT-76 light tanks moved in from Agartala with 57 Mountain Division and fought at Akhaura. The rest of the Regiment which was under 2 Independent Armoured Brigade of 39 Infantry Division of I Corps led the advance in the Shakargarh Sector.

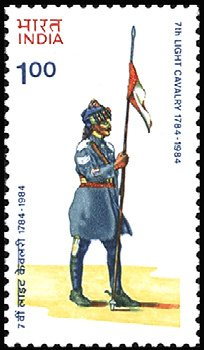
1984 postage stamp on the bicentenary of the regiment

Affiliation

The Regiment and the frigate INS Satpura were affiliated on 5 October 2012.

Miscellaneous

The regiment had the honour to participate in the Republic Day Parade in 1984 with its T-72 tanks.

== Regimental Titles ==
1784 – 2nd Regiment of Madras Native Cavalry
1786 – 1st Regiment of Madras Native Cavalry
1788 – 3rd Regiment of Madras Native Cavalry
1819 – 3rd Regiment of Madras Light Cavalry
1891 – 3rd Regiment of Madras Lancers
1903 – 28th Light Cavalry
1922 – 7th Light Cavalry
1947 – 7th Light Cavalry (to India on Independence)

== Victoria Cross recipient ==
L/Daffadar Gobind Singh, 28th Light Cavalry February 1, 1917 Place of Action: east of Pezières, France attached to the 2nd Lancers (Gardner's Horse)

Citation: Lance Dafadar Gobind Singh of the Indian Cavalry was awarded the Victoria Cross "for most conspicuous bravery and devotion to duty in thrice volunteering to carry messages between the regiment and Brigade Headquarters, a distance of 1½ miles over open ground which was under the observation and heavy fire of the enemy. He succeeded each time in delivering his message, although on each occasion his horse was shot and he was compelled to finish his journey on foot."

== Uniforms and insignia ==
During the early years of its existence the regiment wore red coats with green facings and gold lace. In 1814 the uniform was changed to dark blue with orange facings. In 1817 a general order instructed that the dress of all regular native cavalry in the service of the HEIC should be changed to French grey (a light blue/grey colour). This was to remain the full dress coat colour of the 7th Light Cavalry until 1914. The distinctive orange facings were changed to buff in 1846.

In 1923 the pattern of badge introduced comprised crossed lances with the number "7", surmounted by a crown. In 1930 the design changed to crossed lances with a crown on the intersection, over a scroll with the regimental title.

The present Regimental insignia consists of crossed lances with pennons of the regimental colours, mounted with the State Emblem of India and a scroll at the base with the numeral '7' and the words 'Light Cavalry'. The shoulder title consists of "7C" in brass.
