= Rajinder Singh Sparrow =

Indian military officer (1911–1994)

Major General Rajinder Singh MVC**
- Born: 3 October 1911
- Died: May 1994(83 age)
- Military career
- Allegiance: British India; India
- Branch: British Indian Army; Indian Army
- Service years: 1932–1966
- Rank: Major General
- Nickname: "Sparrow"
- Unit: 7th Light Cavalry
- Commands: 7th Light Cavalry; 1st Armoured Division
- Conflicts: World War II; Indo-Pakistani War of 1947; Indo-Pakistani War of 1965
- Awards: Maha Vir Chakra**
- Other work: Member of the Lok Sabha

Major General Rajinder Singh, MVC** (3 October 1911 – May 1994) was an Indian Army officer and a two time member of the Lok Sabha, the lower house of the Indian parliament. He was nicknamed 'Sparrow'. He was born in a Punjabi Jat Sikh Shergill Family.

== Career ==
Singh served in the ranks of the British Indian Army from 3 October 1932 to 31 January 1938. He attended the Indian Military Academy, Dehra Dun, and was commissioned onto the Unattached List, Indian Army on 1 February 1938. He spent the next year attached to The King's Regiment (Liverpool), a British Army regiment, stationed on the North West Frontier. He was then admitted to the Indian Army and joined the 7th Light Cavalry on 24 February 1939. He was promoted to lieutenant on 30 April 1939, and served during World War II. He was promoted temporary captain and acting major on 16 April 1942, to war-substantive captain and temporary major on 9 January 1943 and to substantive captain on 31 January 1945.

Singh opted to join the Indian Army upon the partition of India in 1947, and commanded the 7th Light Cavalry from September 1947 to May 1949. He was twice awarded the Maha Vir Chakra, the second highest military decoration in India, the first for his role during the Indo-Pakistani War of 1947, for outstanding leadership during the advance and capture of Jhangar (Operation Bison), and the second for displaying gallantry in the Indo-Pakistani War of 1965, during which he was GOC of the 1st Armoured Division.

Promoted to colonel on 30 January 1957, Singh held the appointment of regimental colonel of the 7th Light Cavalry from July 1959 to July 1969. He was appointed D. A.C., Army HQ. On 3 July 1961, he was appointed a G.O.C. commanding a division, with the acting rank of major-general.

Singh retired from the Army on 26 September 1966. After retirement he entered politics and became a minister in the short lived Gurnam Singh ministry in 1967. Later he was elected to the Lok Sabha in 1980 and 1985 for the Jalandhar constituency as a candidate of the Indian National Congress. He died in May 1994, at the age of 83.

== Dates of rank ==
Insignia	Rank	Component	Date of rank
	Second Lieutenant	British Indian Army	1 February 1938 (seniority from 31 January 1937)
	Lieutenant	British Indian Army	24 February 1939
	Captain	British Indian Army	1941 (acting); 16 April 1942 (temporary); 9 January 1943 (war-substantive); 31 January 1945 (substantive)
	Major	British Indian Army	16 April 1942 (acting); 9 January 1943 (temporary)
	Captain	Indian Army	15 August 1947 (Note: Upon independence in 1947, India became a Dominion within the British Commonwealth of Nations. As a result, the rank insignia of the British Army, incorporating the Tudor Crown and four-pointed Bath Star ("pip"), was retained, as George VI remained Commander-in-Chief of the Indian Armed Forces. After 26 January 1950, when India became a republic, the President of India became Commander-in-Chief, and the Ashoka Lion replaced the crown, with a five-pointed star being substituted for the "pip.")
	Major	Indian Army	26 January 1950 (recommissioning and change in insignia)
	Lieutenant-Colonel	Indian Army	31 January 1951 (substantive)
	Colonel	Indian Army	1954 (acting); 30 January 1957
	Brigadier	Indian Army	1 March 1955 (acting); 31 January 1960 (substantive)
	Major General	Indian Army	3 July 1961 (acting); 1965 (substantive)

== Notes ==
Vicky
