= Geoffrey Beyts =

British Indian Army officer and colonial official (1908–2000)

Geoffrey Billy Beyts
- Born: 17 January 1908; Bhudi, Kutch State, India
- Died: 13 December 2000 (aged 92) Benajarafe, Spain
- Allegiance: United Kingdom
- Branch: (British Raj) British Indian Army
- Service years: 1928-1949
- Rank: Brigadier
- Commands: 3rd Battalion, 6th Rajputana Rifles; 62nd Indian Infantry Brigade
- Conflicts: Saya San rebellion Waziristan campaign (1936–39); Second World War
- Awards: Companion of the Distinguished Service Order, Member of the Order of the British Empire, Military Cross, Mentioned in Dispatches

Brigadier Geoffrey Herbert Bruno "Billy" Beyts DSO MBE MC (17 January 1908 – 13 December 2000) was a British Indian Army officer and colonial official in Kenya.

== Early life ==
Beyts was born in Bhudi, Kutch State, India, and educated at Bowden House School, Seaford and Wellington College, Berkshire. He then attended the Royal Military College, Sandhurst, before commissioning into the Indian Army on 2 February 1928.

== Military career ==
He served his first year in India with the Royal Northumberland Fusiliers, before joining the 3rd Battalion, 6th Rajputana Rifles. He served with distinction in Burma during the Saya San rebellion of 1930-1932, and he was awarded the Military Cross in December 1932. Beyts saw further action in the Waziristan campaign (1936–39), before attending the Staff College, Camberley from 1936 to 1937 and working as a staff officer at the War Office of the India Office. At the start of the Second World War, he trained Independent Companies in Scotland that took part in the Norwegian Campaign, and he was made a Member of the Order of the British Empire in 1941.

In August 1942 he returned to India as Chief of Staff to Colin Hercules Mackenzie, and aided him in the establishment of SOE resistance (later named Force 136). Between December 1943 and April 1945, Beyts was Commanding Officer of his old unit, 3rd Battalion, 6th Rajputana Rifles during the Burma Campaign, and he then served as commander of the 62nd Indian Infantry Brigade until June 1945. In May 1945 he was awarded the Distinguished Service Order. From 1946 to Indian independence in 1947 he was Commander of the Infantry School, Mhow.

== Colonial officer and farmer ==
After leaving India in 1947, Beyts established a dairy farm in British Kenya. He applied for work with the British administration there and became District Commissioner for the Mweiga area. His district contained the Treetops Hotel, and in 1952 Beyts was responsible for informing Princess Elizabeth that George VI had died. He left Kenya in 1962 in the wake of the Mau Mau Uprising.

== Subsequent career ==
Always active in many walks of life, despite formal retirement, he was involved in such activities as organising and assisting the settlement of displaced Ugandan Asians, in the British Legion and such like.

== Personal life ==
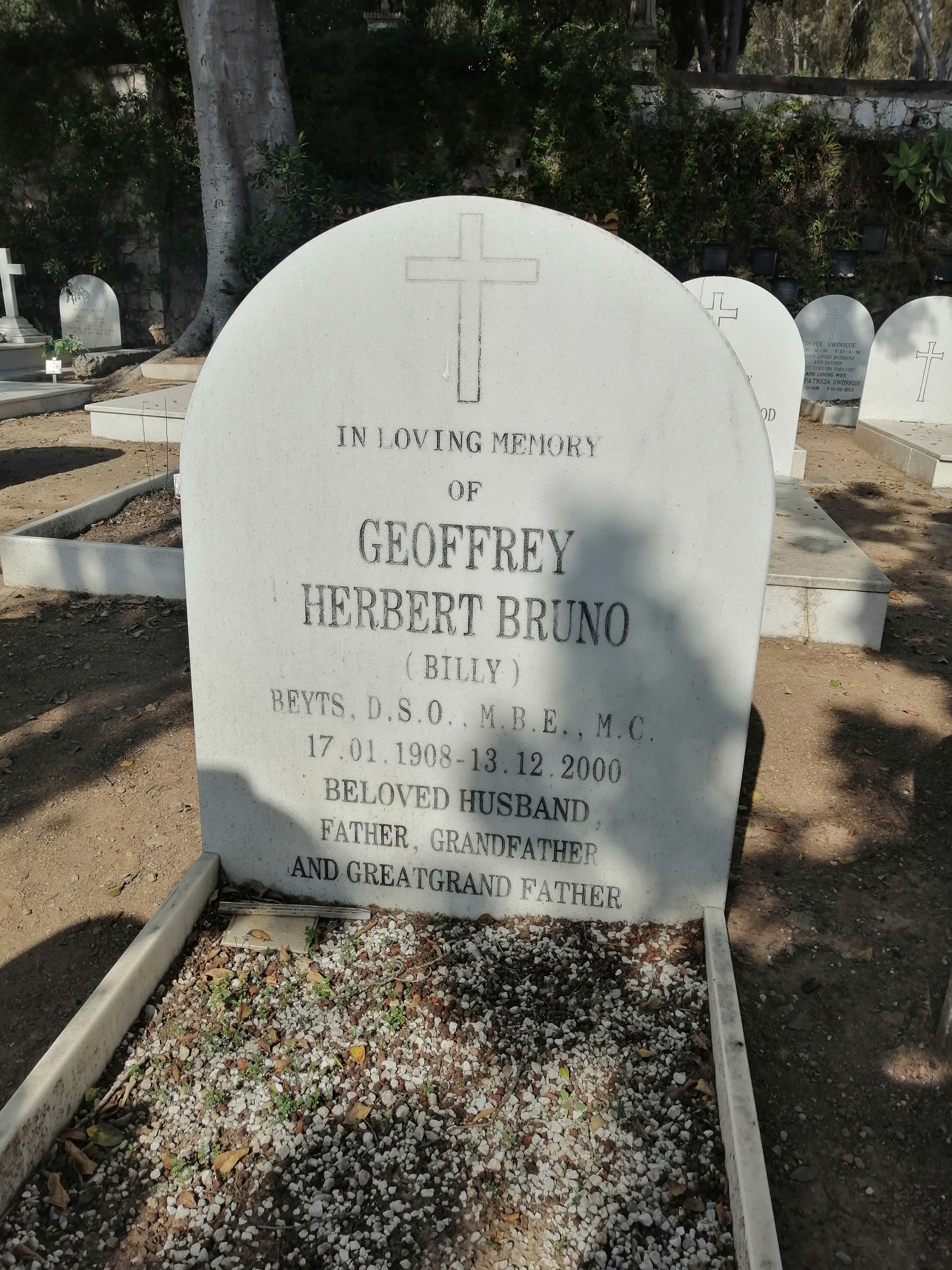
Headstone of Geoffrey Beyts

He married first, in 1940, Ruby Scott-Elliot, who died in 1980. Together they had a son and a daughter, Nicholas and Vanessa. He married, secondly, Linda Segrave Daly. He published an autobiography, The King's Salt, in 1983.

In retirement he lived in Spain, where he died, aged 92, in 2000.

Geoffrey is buried in the English Cemetery, Málaga.
