= Gobind Singh (VC) =

Recipient of the Victoria Cross

Gobind Singh VC
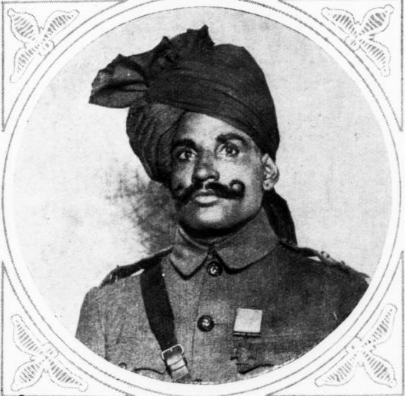
- Born: 7 December 1887; Damoi, Nagaur district, Rajasthan, India
- Died: 9 December 1942 (aged 55)
- Military career
- Allegiance: British India
- Branch: British Indian Army
- Rank: Jemadar
- Units: 2nd Lancers (Gardner's Horse)
- Conflicts: World War I
- Awards: Victoria Cross

Gobind Singh VC (7 December 1887 – 9 December 1942) was a soldier in the British Indian Army, and recipient during the First World War of the Victoria Cross, the highest British and Commonwealth award for gallantry in the face of the enemy.

Gobind Singh was a Rathore Rajput and hailed from a small village named Damoi in the Nagaur district) of Rajasthan, India. He was part of a squadron of Jodhpur Lancers (Sardar Risala) which was transferred to 3rd Madras Cavalry in Oct 1902, later renumbered as 28th Light Cavalry in 1903. He was 29 years old when he became a Lance-Daffadar in the 28th Light Cavalry, the present 7th Light Cavalry. He was later attached to 2nd Lancers (Gardner's Horse) during the First World War. His grandson, Rajendra Singh Rathore has also served as a Colonel in the Indian Army

The Battle of Cambrai was an all-important battle not only because it was an effort by the allied forces to break the Hindenburg Line of the Germans, but also because it was there that tanks were used successfully for the first time in the history of warfare.

On the night of 30 November and 1 December 1917 east of Poizière, Épehy, France, Lance-Dafadar Gobind Singh was in the midst of the Battle of Cambrai, when his regiment was cut off and surrounded by the enemy. An urgent message had to be sent to the brigade headquarters giving the position of the regiment. The route was a 2-mile stretch over open ground, under constant observation and enemy fire. Singh volunteered and not only delivered the message but also undertook a return message and a subsequent one. He survived enemy machine gun fire directed at him on all three occasions although his horses were killed every time. He was one of six men from India to receive the Victoria Cross during World War 1.

== The Citation ==
For most conspicuous bravery and devotion to duty in thrice volunteering to carry messages between the regiment and Brigade Headquarters, a distance of 1½ miles over open ground which was under the observation and heavy fire of the enemy. He succeeded each time in delivering his message, although on each occasion his horse was shot and he was compelled to finish his journey on foot.

— London Gazette, 11 January 1918.

== Details ==
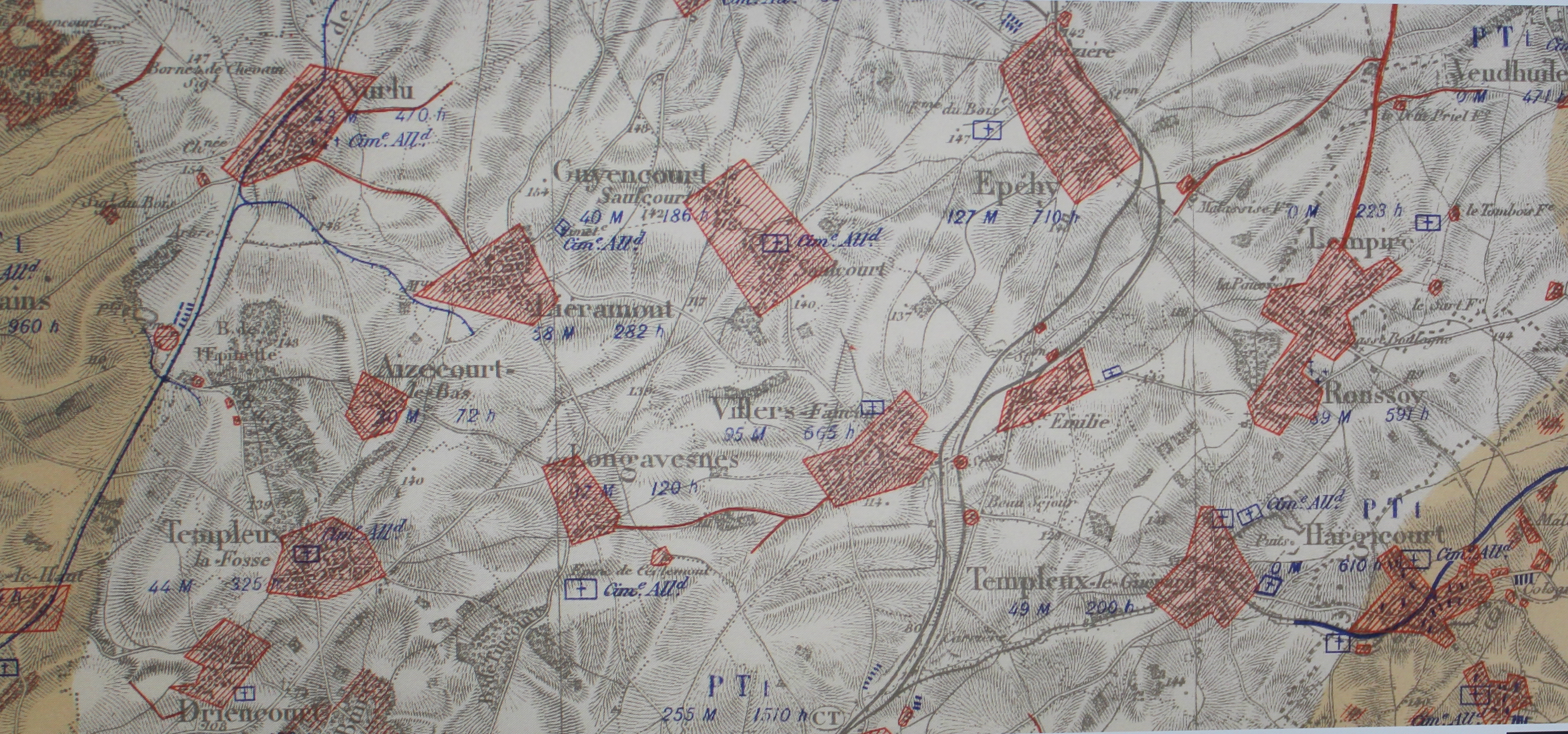
Extract from the Special Map of Devastated Regions, 1920

On 1 December 1917 when the 2nd Lancers was surrounded by the enemy brigade, the situation became very tense because the headquarters was about two miles from this place (Épehy-France).

At this time volunteers were called for to carry a message giving the position of the regiment to the headquarters on the outskirts of Pozieres. Lance Dafadar Gobind Singh and Sowar Jot Ram were selected and given duplicate messages and two different routes. Both of them started immediately on a gallop. Jot Ram was killed as he tried to make his way through the valley. L/Dfr. Gobind Singh was given the open, more difficult route which was under constant enemy fire. He had travelled about half a mile of the lower ground when his horse was killed by machine gun fire. For some time Singh lay still close to his horse, then judging he was no longer watched, he got up and began to run on foot. Immediately there was a burst of machine gun fire upon him. He trembled over as if shot and waited before getting up again and running. By repeating this process varied by wriggling along the ground, he reached the brigade headquarters.

A return message now had to be sent and he volunteered to take this too. He was given another horse and started back taking the high ground south of the valley until he reached the German post. Then dipping down and across the sunken road he had covered two-thirds the distance when his horse was shot and he had to make the rest of his way on foot amid raining machine gun fire.

An hour later another message had to be sent from the regiment. Although exhausted and wounded, Singh came forward again. He was told that he has already done his share but he insisted that it was a privilege and that he knew the ground better than anybody else. On the strength of this the Adjutant allowed him to go. This time he started from the lower end of the road, turned right and passed 'Catelet Copse' and went straight through the barrage in 'Épehy'. By this time the Germans had started heavy shelling and soon his comrades saw a shell land right behind his horse, cutting it in half. Singh disappeared in a cloud of smoke and was presumed dead, but the shell had only killed the horse and thrown him off it. Covered in blood and dust he soon got up and ran on and eventually got into dead ground in rentrant which debouched into the valley. Thence he made his way out of the sight of the enemy to Poizière. Thoroughly exhausted and badly wounded he arrived there at 11.55 AM. He volunteered to make the journey a fourth time, but was not allowed to do so because that would have been certain death. For his conspicuous bravery and unwavering devotion to duty in saving his regiment and fellow men, Lance-Dafadar Gobind Singh was awarded the Victoria Cross.

== The Medal ==
The medal is currently displayed by his regiment 2nd Lancers (Gardner's Horse), Indian Army.

== Awards and decorations ==

	Victoria Cross		
1914–15 Star	British War Medal	Victory Medal	King George VI Coronation Medal
