= 19th Infantry Division (India) =

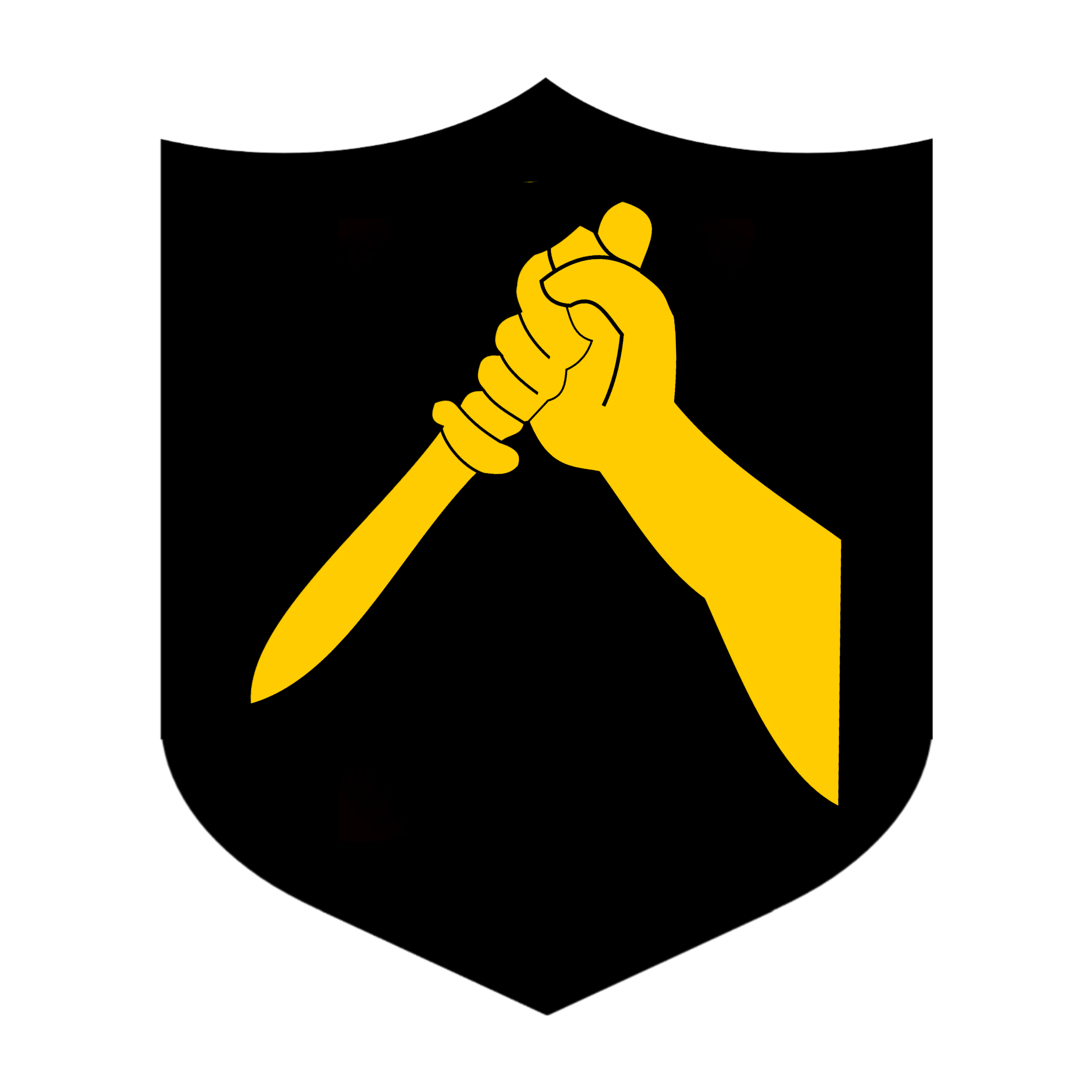
- Formation sign of 19th Infantry Division
- Active: 1941–present
- Country: (British Raj) British India; India
- Allegiance: British Empire; India
- Branch: British Indian Army; Indian Army
- Type: Infantry
- Size: Division
- Nickname: "Dagger Division"
- Engagements: Burma Campaign

Commanders
- Current commander: Major General Paranvir Singh Punia; SM, VSM
- Notable commanders: Brigadier Jackie Smyth VC; Major General Thomas Wynford Rees; Lt General Lakshman Singh Rawat; General Bipin Rawat

The 19th Infantry Division is an infantry division of the Indian Army.

== History ==
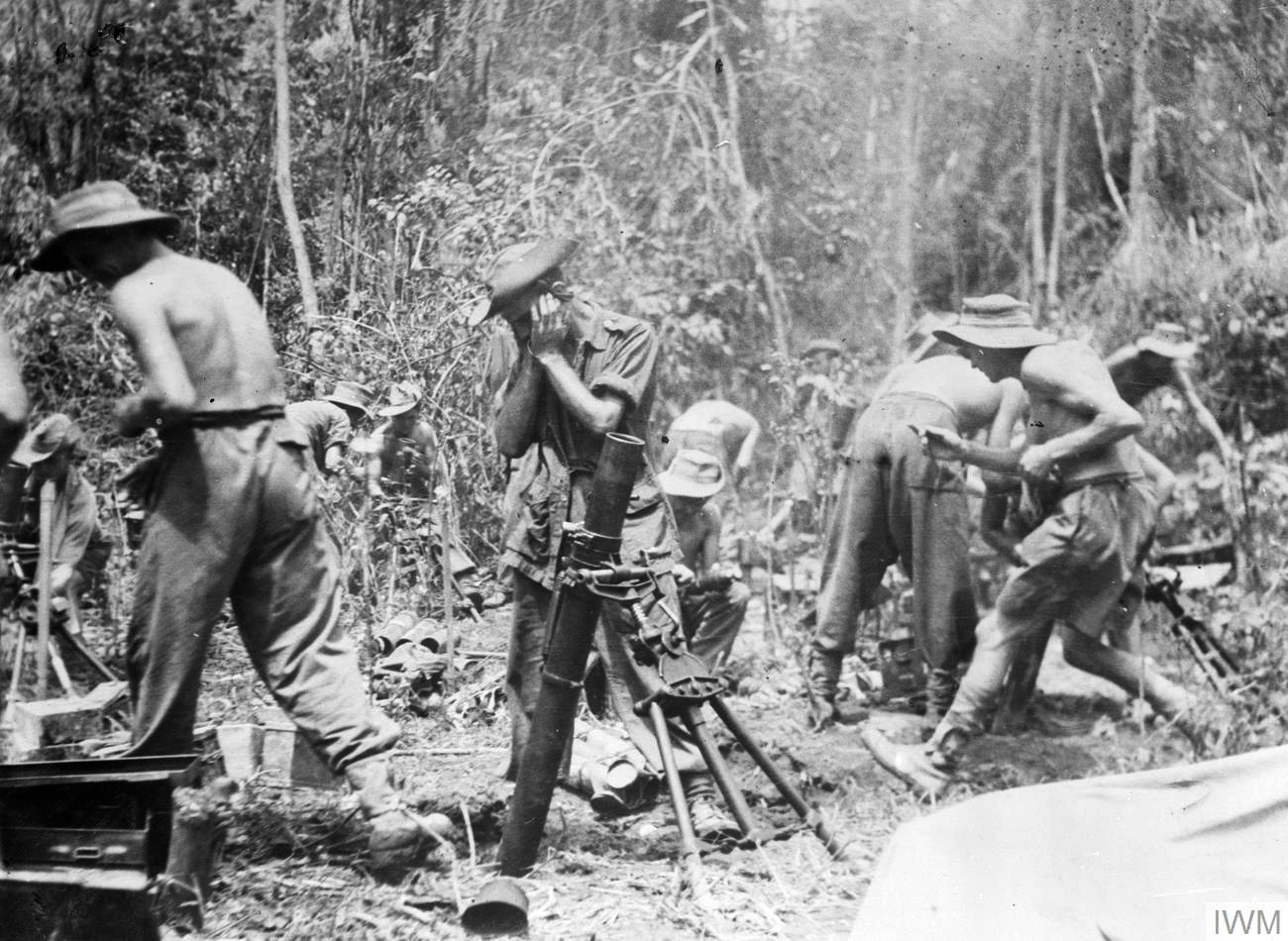
British 3-inch mortar detachments support the 19th Indian Division's advance along the Mawchi Road, east of Toungoo, Burma.

The 19th Indian Infantry Division was raised in Secunderabad, India in October 1941 during the Second World War and became part of Southern Army, which was mainly concerned with defence against a possible seaborne invasion by the Japanese. The division originally consisted of the 47th, 48th and 49th Indian Infantry Brigades. The divisions' first General Officer Commanding (GOC) was Major General Sir Jackie Smyth VC, who left in December to take command of the 17th Indian Infantry Division, then fighting in Burma. Between January and April 1942 all three brigades were reassigned and replaced by the 62nd, 64th and 98th Indian Infantry Brigades.

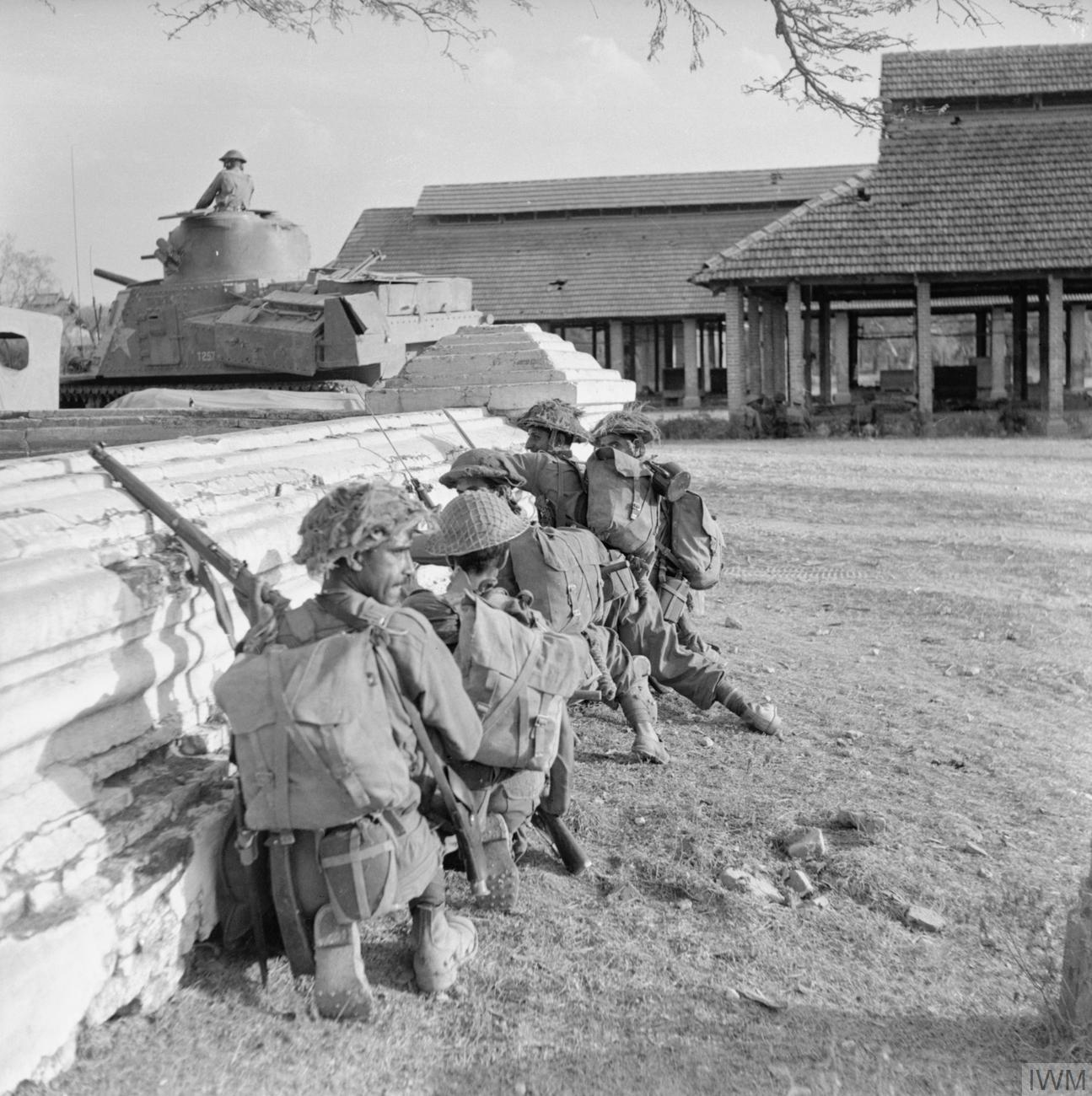
Troops of the 19th Indian Division and a Lee tank in action during street fighting in Mandalay, 9–10 March 1945.

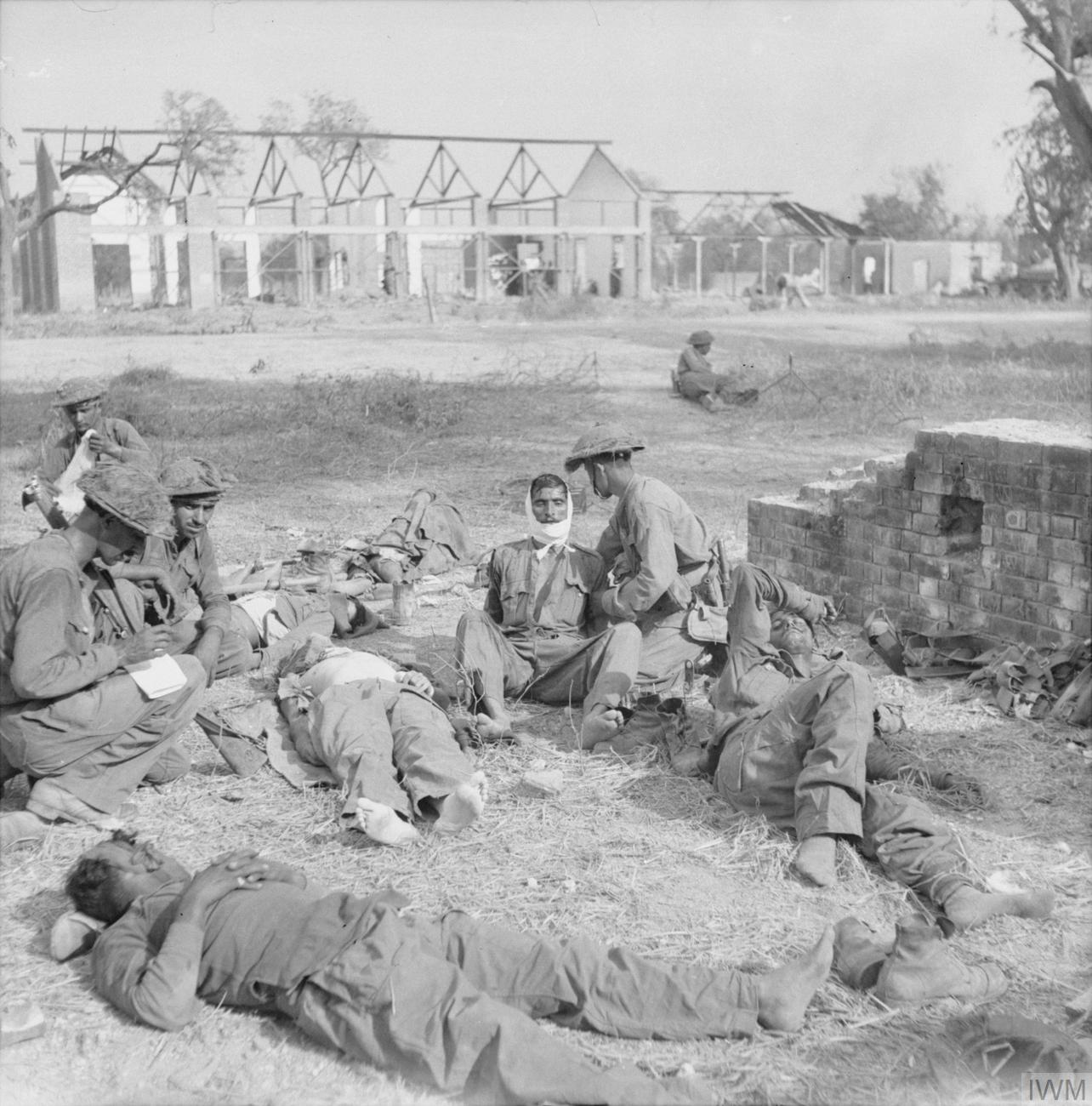
Casualties of the 19th Indian Division being treated in Mandalay, March 1945.

After short periods under the command of Major General Geoffry Scoones and Douglas Stuart the division in October 1942 came under the command Major General Thomas Wynford Rees, who was to become GOC until December 1945. The division spent an extended period on internal security duties and in training before being committed to the Fourteenth Army, commanded by Lieutenant General Sir William J. "Bill" Slim, on the Burma front in July 1944. From October the division concentrated on the Imphal plain under IV Corps and from November its brigades were involved in operations on the Chindwin River advancing to establish contact with the British 36th Infantry Division advancing from the north on their left. Concentrating once more at Sinlamaung the division came under Indian XXXIII Corps, and played the major role in the capture of Mandalay which was completed on 20 March. Transferred to IV Corps, it guarded the Fourteenth Army's lines of communication and mounted an offensive towards Mawchi, in the Kayah State.

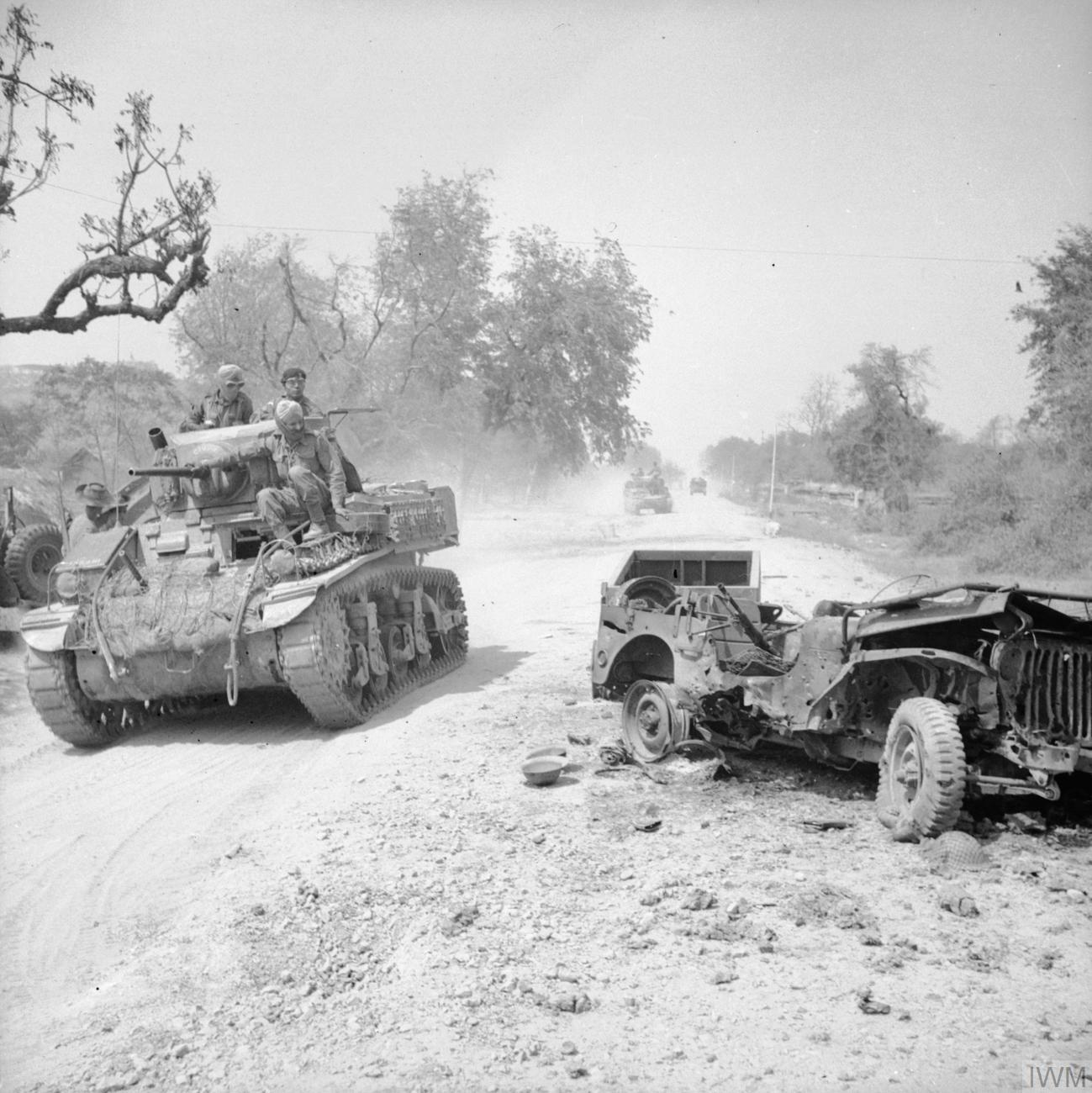
Stuart tank of 19th Indian Division passes a destroyed jeep on the outskirts of Mandalay shortly after the fall of Fort Dufferin, 19 March 1945.

The division's successes were due to its fitness and high morale. It had a high proportion of pre-war regular soldiers among its officers and senior Non-Commissioned Officers. The 19th Indian Division was occasionally referred to as the "Dagger Division", from its divisional sign, which was a hand thrusting a dagger overhand, in yellow on a red background.

During the Second World War, a large number of brigades were assigned or attached to the division. The included at various points the 9th, 47th, 48th, 49th, 62nd, 64th, 98th and 99th Indian Infantry Brigades as well as the 22nd (East Africa) Infantry Brigade.

== Order of Battle 1 March 1945 ==
General Officer Commanding: Major General Thomas Wynford Rees
Commander, Royal Artillery: Brigadier John Alexander MacDonald
Chief of Staff (GSO1): Lieutenant Colonel John Masters

62nd Indian Infantry Brigade (Brigadier James Ronald Morris)

- 2nd Battalion, Welch Regiment
- 3rd Battalion, 6th Rajputana Rifles
- 4th Battalion, 6th Gurkha Rifles

64th Indian Infantry Brigade (Brigadier John Godfrey Flewett)

- 2nd Battalion, Worcestershire Regiment
- 5th Battalion, 10th Baluch Regiment
- 1st Battalion, 6th Gurkha Rifles

98th Indian Infantry Brigade (Brigadier Charles Ian Jerrard)

- 2nd Battalion, Royal Berkshire Regiment
- 8th Battalion, 12th Frontier Force Regiment
- 4th Battalion, 4th Gurkha Rifles

Divisional Troops

- 7th Light Cavalry (attached) Stuart Tanks
- 1st Battalion, Assam Regiment (attached)
- 1st Battalion, 15th Punjab Regiment (Divisional reconnaissance regiment)
- MG Battalion, 11th Sikh Regiment (Divisional Machine Gun Battalion)
- 134th Medium Regiment, Royal Artillery
- 4th Field Regiment, Royal Indian Artillery
- 5th Field Regiment, Indian Artillery
- 115th (North Midland) Field Regiment, Royal Artillery
- 20th Mountain Regiment, Indian Artillery
- 33rd Anti-tank Regiment, Royal Artillery (mixed anti-tank and light anti-aircraft batteries)
- Queen Victoria's Own Madras Sappers & Miners, Indian Engineers
- 64th Field Company, Indian Engineers
- 65th Field Company, Indian Engineers
- 327th Field Park Company, Indian Engineers
- Royal Bombay Sappers and Miners, Indian Engineers
- 29th Field Company, Indian Engineers
- 9th Bridging Platoon, Indian Engineers

== Postwar ==
Just before the Indian/Pakistani war of 1965 began, 19th Infantry Division was at Baramula under XV Corps (India). Its brigades were the 104th Brigade, Tithwal, the 161st Brigade, Uri and the 268th Indian Infantry Brigade, Baramula.
