= Thomas Wynford Rees =

British military officer (1898–1959)

Thomas Wynford Rees CB CIE DSO* MC DL
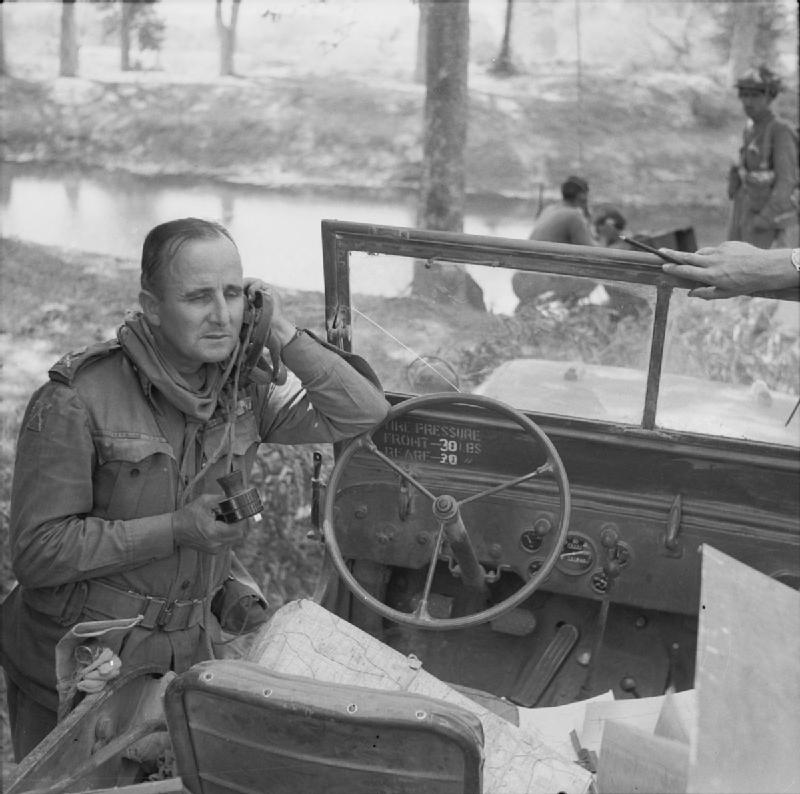
- Born: Thomas Wynford Rees; 12 January 1898; Cardiff, Wales
- Died: 15 October 1959 (aged 61)
- Spouse: Agatha Rosalie Innes
- Children: Peter Rees (son)
- Military career
- Allegiance: United Kingdom
- Branch: British Indian Army
- Service years: 1915–1948
- Rank: Major-General
- Nicknames: "Pete" "Napoleon"
- Service number: 37923
- Units: 73rd Carnatic Infantry; 125th Napier's Rifles; 6th Rajputana Rifles
- Commands: Punjab Boundary Force (1947); 4th Indian Infantry Division (1945–47); 19th Indian Infantry Division (1942–45); 10th Indian Infantry Division (1942); 10th Indian Infantry Brigade (1941–42); 3rd Battalion, 6th Rajputana Rifles (1938–39)
- Conflicts: First World War; North-West Frontier; Second World War
- Awards: Companion of the Order of the Bath; Companion of the Order of the Indian Empire; Distinguished Service Order & Bar; Military Cross; Mentioned in Despatches (6)
- Other work: Honorary Colonel Welch Regiment; Deputy Lord Lieutenant of Monmouthshire

Major-General Thomas Wynford Rees, CB, CIE, DSO & Bar, MC, DL (12 January 1898 – 15 October 1959) was a Welsh officer in the British Indian Army during the First World War, the interwar years and the Second World War

== Early life and military career ==
The son of the Reverend T. M. Rees, he passed out from the Officer Cadet College, Quetta and was commissioned into the British Indian Army in November 1915 in the 73rd Carnatic Infantry.

In September 1916, Rees was transferred to the 125th Napier's Rifles and was promoted to lieutenant a month later.

During the First World War, Rees was awarded the Distinguished Service Order (DSO) and Military Cross (MC) and was mentioned in despatches. The citation for his DSO, published in the London Gazette on 29 July 1919, reads:

For conspicuous gallantry throughout the day on September 19th, 1918, during the attack on the Turkish position about Tabsor, and especially after passing through the last objective into open country. Collecting various details of four different units up to a total of about 80 men, he organised them into parties, charged in face of strong opposition, and took two trenches, capturing about 50 prisoners and two field guns. Subsequently, when mounted on a captured pony, he saw a third field gun escaping, whereupon he galloped after it and, single-handed, captured the gun and team complete. He set a magnificent example to all units by his initiative and utter disregard of danger.

The citation for his MC, published in the London Gazette on 24 September 1918, reads:

For conspicuous gallantry and devotion to duty in charge of a patrol. He pushed on with half his patrol, and charged a line of enemy rifle-pits in face of considerable bombing, springing into a rifle-pit himself and shooting one of the enemy, after which he pursued the remainder for a short time with his patrol.

== Between the wars ==
Between the world wars Rees spent much of his time serving on the North West Frontier of India, being mentioned in despatches three more times. He served a term as private secretary to the Governor of Burma, Sir Charles Alexander Innes for which he was appointed a Companion of the Order of the Indian Empire (CIE) in the 1931 New Years honours list. In December 1937 was made brevet lieutenant colonel for "distinguished services rendered in the field in connection with the operations in Waziristan, during the period 25th November, 1936, to 16th January, 1937".

== Second World War ==
During the Second World War, Rees fought in the East African campaign, the North African campaign, and the Burma campaign. He was awarded a Bar to his DSO and mentioned in despatches twice.

As head staff officer of the 4th Indian Infantry Division (GSO1), Rees organised the division's highly successful action during Operation Compass in the Western Desert in 1940. The division then played a key role in defeating the Italian imperial forces in Eritrea during the East African Campaign during which time he was promoted to command Indian 10th Infantry brigade, part of Indian 5th Infantry Division which was fighting alongside 4th Indian Division. 10th Brigade played a leading role in the Battle of Keren, the decisive battle of the campaign.

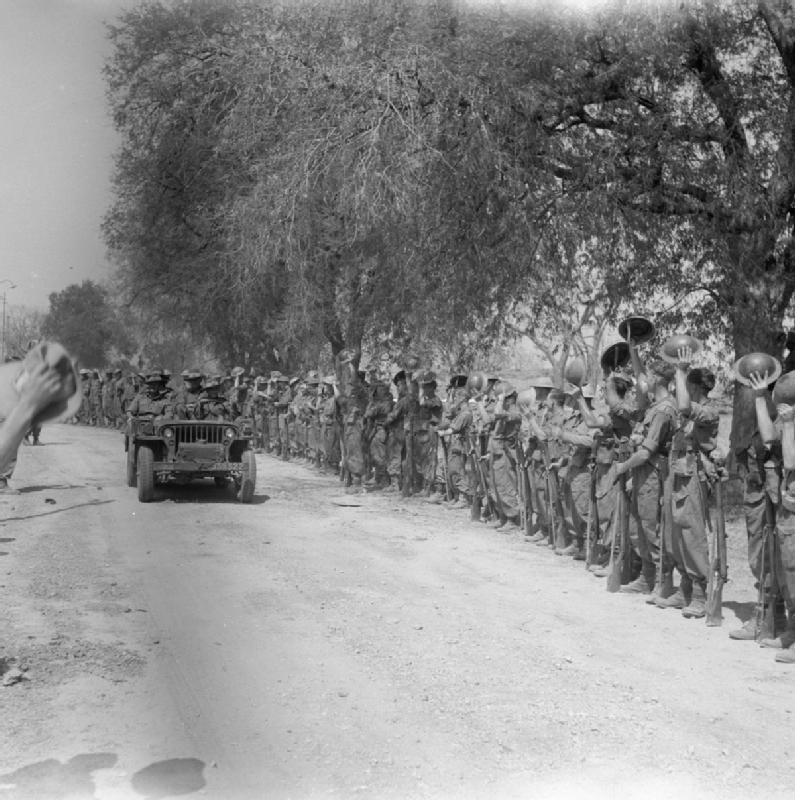
Lieutenant General Sir William Slim and Major General T. W. Rees are cheered by troops as they leave Mandalay in a jeep, March 1945.

The 5th Indian Division left East Africa in March 1941 spending periods in Iraq, Egypt and Cyprus. In March 1942, Rees was promoted acting major general to command 10th Indian Infantry Division, which was at the time in Iraq. Two months later the division was sent to the Western Desert to reinforce the Eighth Army.

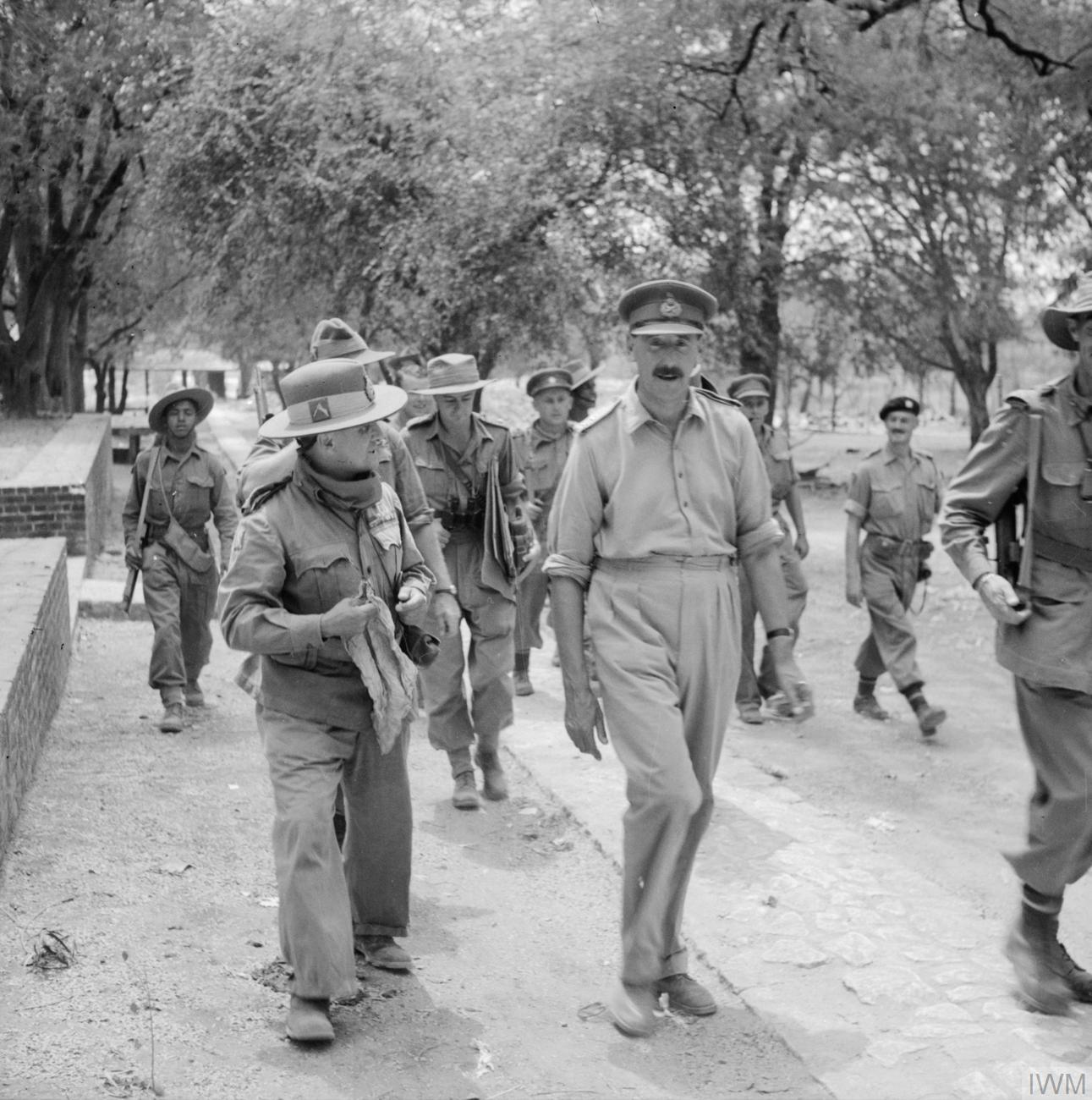
Major General T. W. Rees (on the left) talking with Lieutenant General Sir Oliver Leese, 19 March 1945, wearing a red scarf.

Controversially, during the Eighth Army's retreat from the Battle of Gazala, Rees was relieved of command of the division by his corps commander Lieutenant General William Gott. The division, having been employed piecemeal during the battle, was ordered to consolidate near Mersa Matruh on the Egyptian border and hold off the Axis advance for 72 hours. Rees responded that the division had only just come together and that defensive works were still inadequate. He therefore doubted the division's ability to hold off a full-scale attack despite the addition of an extra brigade (2nd Free French Brigade). Gott told Rees he lacked resolution for the job and sacked him. General Claude Auchinleck, the C-in-C, doubting that Rees was irresolute (but obliged to support his senior commander) gave Rees the job of organising the defence of Cairo in case of an Axis breakthrough. Shortly thereafter Rees's fears were confirmed when the 10th Indian Division's position was overrun. When the Axis threat to Cairo faded, Rees was sent back to India.

In the autumn of 1942 Rees was appointed to command Indian 19th Infantry Division. Although the division was not sent to the front line in Burma until November 1944, from this date until the end of the war it was in continuous action, gaining a formidable reputation for itself and Rees, who was seen as one of the army's most offensively-minded generals. His army commander, General Sir William Slim, was later to write:

[19th Indian Division was] literally led by their dynamic commander, Pete Rees, known to his British troops as the 'Pocket Napoleon'… What he lacked in inches he made up by the miles he advanced...he was an inspiring divisional commander. The only criticism I made was to point out that the best huntsmen did not invariably ride ahead of their hounds.

== Post-war ==
From 1945 to 1947 Rees commanded the Indian 4th Infantry Division and from August to September 1947, he commanded the neutral Punjab Boundary Force tasked to maintain law and order in the Punjab which was to be divided during the transfer of power to India and Pakistan. The force was too small to control such a large area, particularly since the police forces either disintegrated or became polarised. Despite the Boundary Force's best efforts full-scale riots and massacres took place. The scrupulous neutrality shown by Rees's force brought serious criticism from the politicians of both sides and it was disbanded in early September 1947, two weeks after independence. Rees has also been criticised for refusing to heed the advice of "Military Advisors" and "Alternate Military Advisors" from the Indian and Pakistani sides on the grounds that they were junior to him.

Promoted to the permanent rank of major-general in 1947, Rees took the job as head of the Military Committee of the Indian Emergency Cabinet until he retired from the army in 1948.

Rees was appointed a Deputy Lieutenant for Monmouthshire on 15 January 1955.

== Personal life ==
Rees was married in 1926 to Agatha Rosalie Innes, only daughter of Sir Charles Alexander Innes, a career India Civil Service officer and Governor of Burma from 1927 to 1932. They had one son, the Cabinet minister Peter Wyford Innes Rees (later Lord Rees), and one daughter.

John Masters noted in one of his autobiographies (The Road Past Mandalay) that Pete Rees was an abstinent (he "spoke softly, never swore, never drank, did not smoke." but also, "always wore a small kind smile"). According to Masters, Rees was a polyglot and spoke English, Welsh, "...Urdu, Marathi, Pushtu, Burmese, and Tamil. Now he asked me to teach him Gurkhali, and soon he knew enough to cause a look of startled pleasure to cross many a stolid Gurung face." Masters also said of Rees that he had a "rare, personal gentleness and unfailing good manners".

== Military career ==
- Passed out from Officer Cadet College, Quetta and commissioned 2nd lieutenant into the Indian Army unattached list (1915)
- Attached to 73rd Carnatic Infantry (1915)
- Attached to 125th Napier's Rifles (later 5th (Napier's) battalion 6th Rajputana Rifles)
- Awarded DSO while in Egypt – (1919)
- Staff Captain in Wazir Force, Waziristan – (1922–1925)
- Staff Officer (Intelligence) (GSO3), India – (1925–1926)
- Instructor, Royal Military College, Sandhurst – (1926–1928)
- Private Secretary to Governor of Burma – (1928–1930)
- Attended Staff College, Camberley (1931–1932)
- Promoted to major (November 1933)
- Staff Officer (GSO3), India – (1934)
- Waziristan, North West Frontier, India – (1935–1937)
- Deputy Assistant Quartermaster General, India – (1936–1937)
- Appointed brevet lieutenant-colonel for "distinguished services in the field ...in Waziristan during the period 25 November 1936 and 16 January 1937" – (1937))
- General Staff Officer Grade 2, Waziristan District, North West Frontier, India – (1937–1938)
- Commanding Officer, 3rd Battalion, 6th Rajputana Rifles, India – (1938–1939)
- General Staff Officer 1, Indian 4th Infantry Division, North Africa and Sudan – (1940–1941)
- Commanding Officer, 10th Indian Brigade, Sudan – (1941–1942)
- General Officer Commanding, Indian 10th Infantry Division, Middle East – North Africa – (1942)
- General Officer Commanding, Indian 19th Infantry Division, Burma – (1942–1945)
- Permanent rank advanced to Colonel.
- General Officer Commanding, Indian 4th Infantry Division – (1945–1947)
- General Officer Commanding, Punjab Boundary Force, India – (1947)
- Head Military Emergency Staff to Emergency Committee of Cabinet, India – (1947)
- Retired – (1948)

== Bibliography ==
- Callahan, Raymond (2007). Churchill and His Generals. University Press of Kansas, 2007. ISBN 978-070061512-4.
- Jeffreys, Alan; Anderson, Duncan (2005). The British Army in the Far East 1941–45, p. 47. Oxford: Osprey. ISBN 1-84176-790-5.
- Mackenzie, Compton (1951). Eastern Epic. London: Chatto & Windus. OCLC 1412578.
- Masters, John (1961). The Road Past Mandalay.
- Mead, Richard (2007). Churchill's Lions: A Biographical Guide to the Key British Generals of World War II. Stroud: Spellmount. ISBN 978-1-86227-431-0.
- Smart, Nick (2005). Biographical Dictionary of British Generals of the Second World War. Barnesley: Pen & Sword. ISBN 1844150496.
- Slim, Field Marshal Viscount (1972) [1956]. Defeat into Victory. London: Cassell. ISBN 0-304-29114-5.

Military offices
Preceded by William Slim	GOC 10th Indian Infantry Division; March–June 1942	Succeeded by John Nichols
Preceded by Douglas Stuart	GOC 19th Indian Infantry Division; 1942–1945	Post disbanded
Preceded by Charles Boucher	GOC 4th Indian Infantry Division; 1945–1947	Post disbanded
