= 98th Indian Infantry Brigade =

- Active: 1941–1945
- Country: (British Raj) British India
- Allegiance: British Empire
- Branch: British Indian Army
- Type: Infantry
- Size: Brigade
- Engagements: Burma Campaign

Commanders
- Notable commanders: CI Jerrard

The 98th Indian Infantry Brigade was an infantry brigade formation of the Indian Army during World War II. It was formed in April 1941, at Bareilly. The brigade served with three different divisions in the Burma Campaign. The 34th Indian Infantry Division between October 1941 and January 1942. The 25th Indian Infantry Division between January and March 1942 and the 19th Indian Infantry Division from March 1942, until the end of the war, fighting in the Burma Campaign.

== Formation ==
- 8th Battalion 14th Punjab Regiment April 1941 to July 1942
- 9th Battalion 13th Frontier Force Rifles September 1941 to July 1942
- 8th Battalion 12th Frontier Force Regiment March 1942 to August 1945
- 3rd Battalion 6th Rajputana Rifles July 1942 to September 1943
- 2nd Battalion Royal Berkshire Regiment January 1943 to June 1945
- 4th Battalion 4th Gurkha Rifles September 1943 to August 1945
- MG Battalion 11th Sikh Regiment January 1945
- 1st Battalion 15th Punjab Regiment March 1945
- 5th Battalion 10th Baluch Regiment March 1945

== See also ==
- List of Indian Army Brigades in World War II
