= 62nd Indian Infantry Brigade =

- Active: 1943–1945
- Country: British India
- Branch: British Indian Army
- Size: Brigade
- Engagements: Burma Campaign

Commanders
- Notable commanders: Brigadier M S Teversham; Brigadier D C Hawthorn; Brigadier J R Morris; Brigadier G H B Beyts; Brigadier J R Morris

The 62nd Indian Infantry Brigade was an Infantry formation of the Indian Army during World War II. It was formed in November 1943, and assigned to the 19th Indian Infantry Division The brigade fought in the Burma Campaign and remained with the 19th Division until the end of the war.

== Formation ==
- 4th Battalion, 6th Queen Elizabeth's Own Gurkha Rifles November 1941 to August 1945
- 4th Battalion, 4th Gurkha Rifles November 1941 to September 1943
- 7th battalion, 2nd Punjab Regiment November 1941 to August 1942
- 2nd Battalion, Welch Regiment August 1942 to August 1945
- 3rd Battalion, 6th Rajputana Rifles September 1943 to August 1945
- 1st Battalion, 6th Queen Elizabeth's Own Gurkha Rifles November to December 1944 and January to February 1945
- 1st Battalion, Assam Regiment January to February 1945
- 2nd Battalion, Royal Berkshire Regiment July to August 1945

== See also ==
- List of Indian Army Brigades in World War II
