= Jadunath Singh =

Indian soldier (1916–1948)

Naik Jadunath Singh PVC
- Born: 21 November 1916; Khajuri, Shahjahanpur, British India
- Died: 6 February 1948 (aged 31); Tain Dhar, Nowshera, Jammu and Kashmir, Dominion of India
- Military career
- Allegiance: British India (1941-1947); India (1947–1948)
- Branch: British Indian Army; Indian Army
- Service years: 1941–1948
- Rank: Naik
- Service number: 27373
- Unit: 1st Battalion, Rajput Regiment
- Conflicts: Second World War: Arakan Campaign 1942–1943; Indo-Pakistani War of 1947
- Awards: Param Vir Chakra

Naik Jadunath Singh, PVC, (21 November 1916 – 6 February 1948) was an Indian soldier who was posthumously awarded the Param Vir Chakra, India's highest military decoration, for his actions in an engagement during the Indo-Pakistani War of 1947–1948.

Born in Shahjahanpur, Singh enlisted in the British Indian Army in 1941 and served during World War II, fighting against Japanese forces in the Burma campaign. He subsequently participated in the Indo-Pakistani War of 1947 as a member of the newly established Indian Army. For his actions on 6 February 1948 at Tain Dhar, to the north of Naushahra, Singh was awarded the Param Vir Chakra.

Singh commanded a nine-man forward section post. Though heavily outnumbered by advancing Pakistani forces, Singh led his men in defending against three attempts to overtake the post. He was wounded during the second assault. Armed with a Sten gun, he single-handedly charged the third assault with such determination as to cause the attackers to withdraw. In doing so, he was killed. A sports stadium in Shahjahanpur, a locomotive engine and an oil tanker were named after Singh.

== Early life ==
Singh was born in a Rathore Rajput family on 21 November 1916 in Khajuri village of Shahjahanpur, Uttar Pradesh. He was the son of Birbal Singh Rathore, a farmer, and Jamuna Kanwar. He was the third of eight children, with six brothers and a sister.

Though Singh studied up to fourth year standard in a local school in his village, he could not continue his education further due to his family's economic situation. He spent most of his childhood helping out his family with agricultural work around the farm. For recreation, he wrestled and eventually became the wrestling champion of his village. For his character and well-being, he was nicknamed "Hanuman Bhagat Bal Brahmachari". This was after Hanuman, a Hindu god who was unmarried for life. Singh never married.

== Military career ==
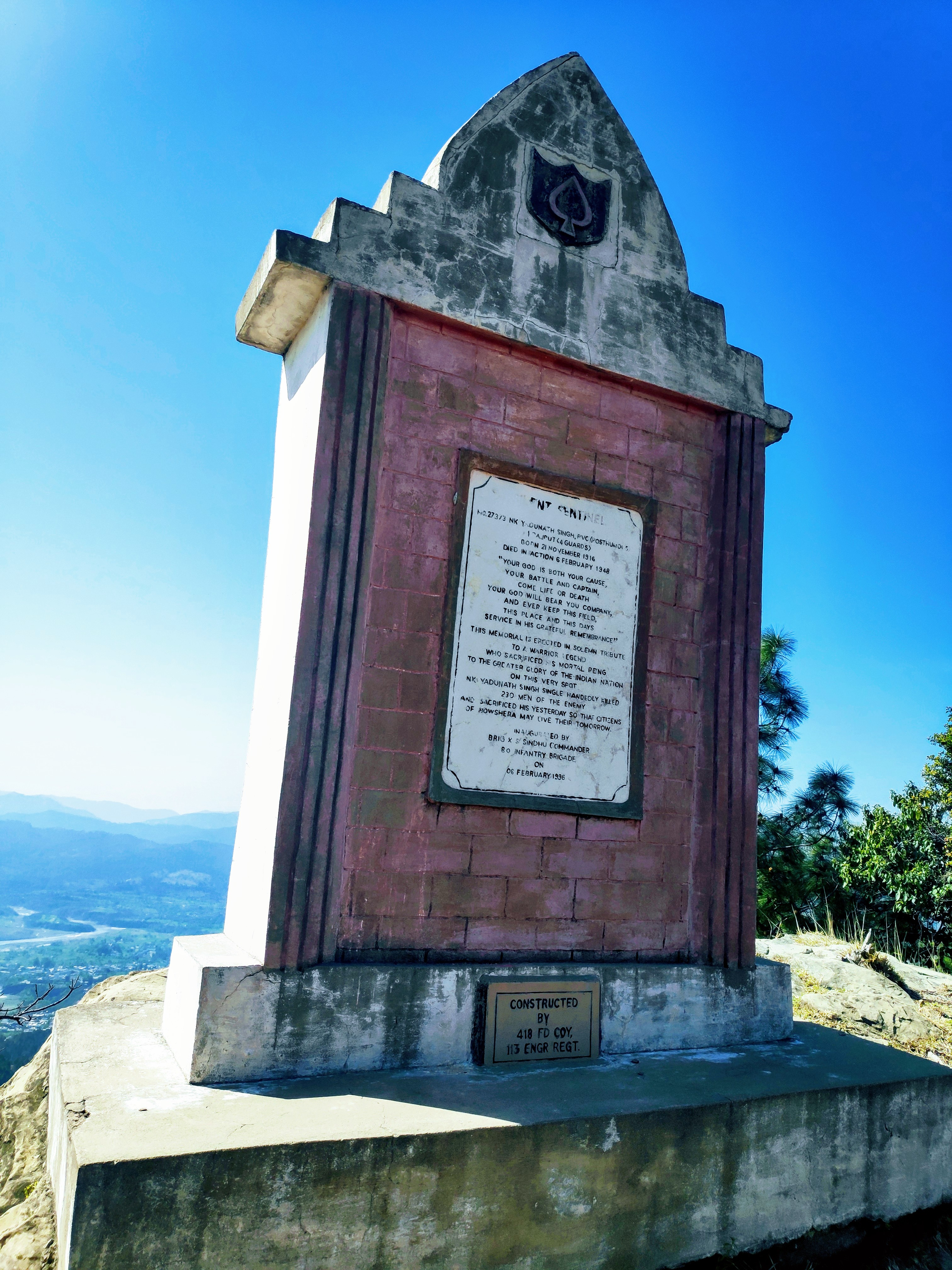
Naik Jadunath Singh Memorial at Taindhar Top near Naushera J&K

During the Second World War, Singh enlisted in the 7th Rajput Regiment of the British Indian Army, on 21 November 1941 at Fatehgarh Regimental Centre. On completing his training, Singh was posted to the regiment's 1st Battalion. During late 1942, the battalion was deployed to the Arakan Province (Note: Now Rakhine State.) during the Burma campaign, where they fought against the Japanese. The battalion was part of the 47th Indian Infantry Brigade, assigned to the 14th Indian Infantry Division. It fought actions around the Mayu Range in late 1942 and early 1943, advancing up the Mayu Peninsula towards Donbaik as part of an operation to recapture Akyab Island. Although the Rajputs were held up around the cluster of villages called Kondan in December 1942, the advance slowly continued towards Donbaik. It was there, where the brigade's attack ground to a halt and they were subsequently relieved by the 55th Indian Infantry Brigade in early February 1943. In early April, the Japanese counterattacked. The 47th Brigade became cut off around Indan and eventually split off into small groups to fight their way back to Allied lines. The surviving members of the brigade returned to India. In 1945, Singh's battalion was assigned to the 2nd Indian Infantry Brigade and took over the defence of the Andaman and Nicobar Islands. The islands had been partially occupied by the Japanese forces, which surrendered on 7 October 1945. After returning to India, Singh was promoted to the rank of Naik (corporal). After the partition, the 7th Rajput Regiment was assigned to the Indian Army. Singh remained with the newly raised Indian regiment, continuing to serve in its 1st Battalion.

=== War of 1947 ===
In October 1947, following an offensive by the Pakistani raiders in Jammu and Kashmir, the Defence Committee of the Indian Cabinet directed the Army Headquarters to undertake a military response. The Army planned several operations to drive out the raiders as directed. In one such operation, the 50th Para Brigade, to which the Rajput Regiment was attached, was ordered to secure Naushahra and establish a base at Jhangar in mid-November.

Bad weather prevented this action and on 24 December, Jhangar, a strategically advantageous position in the Naushahra Sector, was captured by the Pakistanis which gave them control over the communication lines between Mirpur and Poonch and provided a starting point from which attacks could be made on Naushahra. The following month, the Indian Army undertook several operations in the north-west of Naushahra to stop further advances by the Pakistani forces. Brigadier Mohammad Usman, the commanding officer of the 50th Para Brigade, had made necessary arrangements to counter the expected attack. Soldiers were deployed in small groups on possible enemy approaches.

Tain Dhar, lying to the north of Naushahra, was one such approach for which Singh's battalion was responsible. On the morning of 6 February 1948, at 6:40 am IST, Pakistani forces opened fire on pickets from the battalion patrolling along Tain Dhar ridge. Gunfire was exchanged between both sides. The foggy early morning darkness helped the attacking Pakistanis creep up to the pickets. Soon, men in the posts on the Tain Dhar ridge observed a large number of Pakistani soldiers moving towards them. Singh was in command of the nine personnel manning the forward post of the second picket at Tain Dhar. Singh and his section were able to ward off three successive attempts by Pakistani forces to capture their position. By the end of third wave, of the 27 men at the post, 24 were dead or severely wounded. Singh being a section commander at the post, displayed "exemplary" leadership, and kept motivating his men till he succumbed to his wounds. This proved a very critical moment for the battle at Naushahra. In the meantime, Brigadier Usman sent a company of the 3rd (Para) Battalion, Rajput Regiment, to reinforce Tain Dhar. Without Singh engaging the Pakistani troops for a considerable period, re-capture of these posts would have been impossible.

==== Param Vir Chakra ====
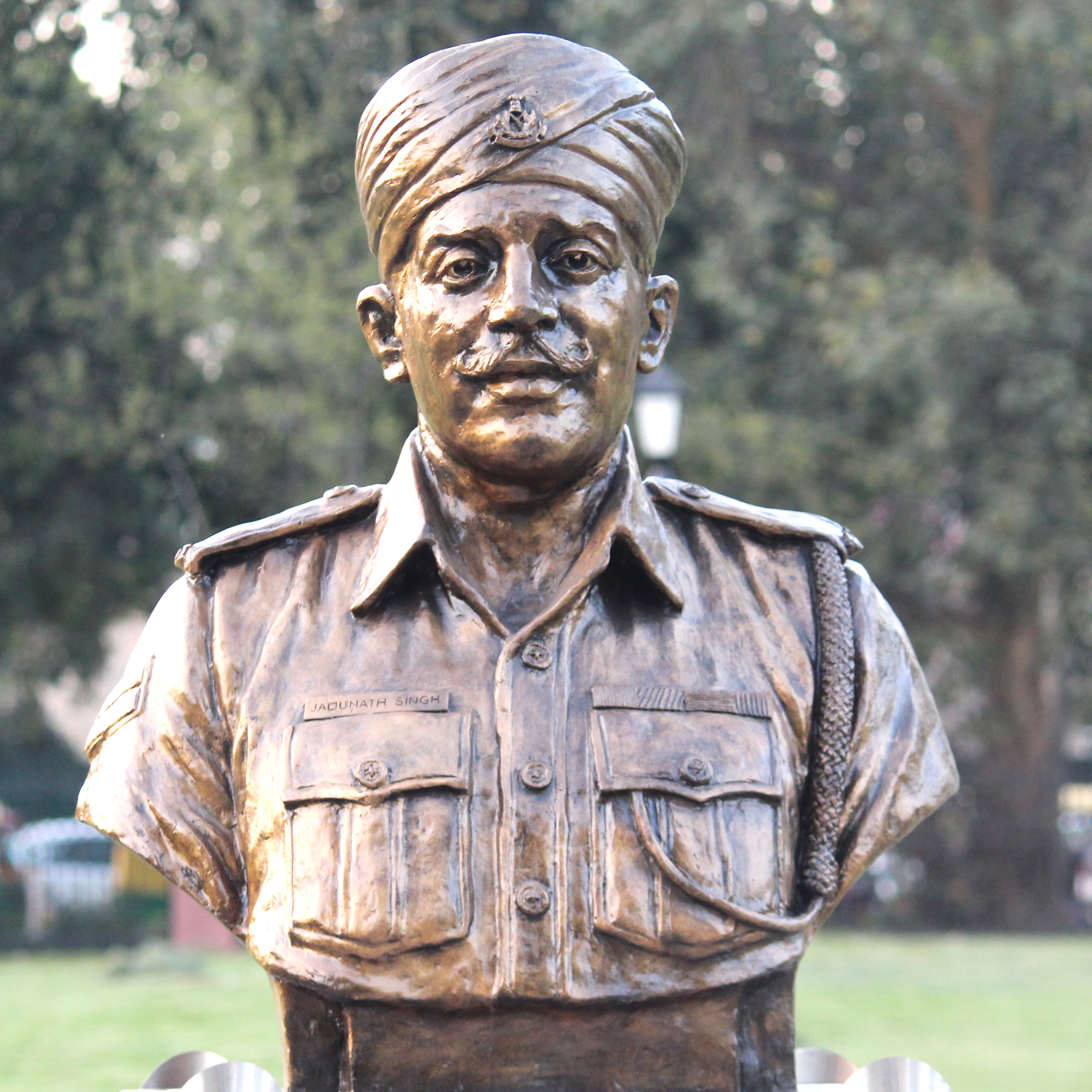
Singh's statue at Param Yodha Sthal, National War Memorial, New Delhi

Singh was posthumously awarded the India's highest military decoration, the Param Vir Chakra for his actions on 6 February 1948. The official citation is as follows:

At No 2 picquet on Taindhar on 6 February 1948, No 27373 Naik Jadunath Singh was in command of a forward section post, which bore the full brunt of the enemy attack. Nine men against overwhelming odds garrisoned the little post. The enemy launched its attack in successive waves and with great ferocity to overcome this post. The first wave swept up to the post in a furious attack. Displaying great valour and superb qualities of leadership Naik Jadunath Singh so used the small force at his disposal that the enemy retired in utter confusion. Four of his men were wounded but Naik Jaunath Singh again showed his qualities of good leadership by reorganising the battered force under him, for meeting another onslaught. His coolness and courage were of such an order that the men rallied and were ready for the second attack which came with greater determination and in larger number than the preceding one. Though hopelessly outnumbered, this post under the gallant leadership of Naik Jadunath Singh resisted. All were wounded, and Naik Jadunath Singh, though wounded in the right arm, personally took over the Bren gun from the wounded Bren gunner. The enemy was right on the walls of the post but Naik Jadunath Singh once again showed outstanding ability and valour of the highest order in action. By his complete disregard for his personal safety and example of coolness and courage, he encouraged his men to fight. His fire was so devastating, that what looked like impending defeat was turned into a victory and the enemy retreated in chaos leaving the dead and wounded littered on the ground. With this act of supreme heroism and outstanding example of leadership and determination, Naik Jadunath Singh saved the post from the second assault. By this time, all men in the post were casualties. The enemy put in his third and final attack in undiminished numbers and determination to capture this post. Naik Jadunath Singh, now wounded, prepared literally single-handed to give battle for the third time. With great courage and determination, he came out of the sangar (Note: A sangar is a small protected structure used for observing or firing from, which is built up from the ground.) and finally with the Sten gun, made a most magnificent single-handed charge on the advancing enemy, who, completely taken by surprise, fled in disorder. Naik Jadunath Singh, however, met his gallant death in his third and last charge when two bullets hit him in the head and chest. Thus, charging single-handedly at the advancing enemy, this Non-Commissioned Officer, performed the highest act of gallantry and self-sacrifice and by so doing saved his section-nay, his whole picquet from being overrun by the enemy at the most critical stage in the battle for the defence of Nushera.

— Gazette Notification: 16 Pres/50, 11–12.50,

== Honours and decorations ==

	Param Vir Chakra	General Service Medal	
Indian Independence Medal	1939–45 Star	Burma Star	War Medal 1939–1945

== Legacy ==
The Shipping Corporation of India (SCI), an Indian Government enterprise under the Ministry of Shipping, named fifteen of her crude oil tankers in honour of the Param Vir Chakra recipients. The crude oil tanker named MT Naik Jadunath Singh, PVC was delivered to SCI on 21 September 1984. The tanker was phased out after 25 years of service. A sports stadium in Shahjahanpur, the town near the village where Singh was born, was named as "Paramveer Chakra Lance Nayak (Note: Nayak is a variation of naik.) Jadunath Singh Sports Stadium" in his honour.

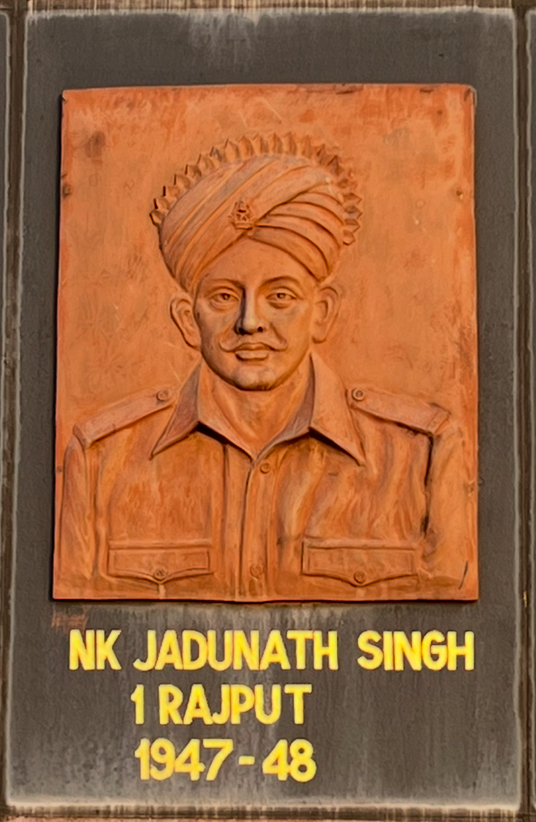
Relief Mural in Balidan Stambh

Balidan Stambh, the war memorial in Jammu in 2009 paid tribute to him by inscribing his name on the pillars erected in semi circumference for the martyrs of the 1947-48 war. His name is displayed near the eternal flame and as relief mural on the semi circumference wall with the Param Vir Chakra awardees who attained martyrdom in Jammu and Kashmir.

== In popular culture ==
- The fourth episode on DD National of Param Vir Chakra TV series, Jadunath Singh's character was portrayed by Bollywood actor Puneet Issar aired in 1988.
- A graphic novel titled Param Vir Chakra by Amar Chitra Katha dedicated their fourth story written by Aparna Kapur and drawn by Durgesh Velhal in 2015
- A graphic novel titled Param Vir Chakra Jadunath Singh by Roli Books written by Ian Cardozo and drawn by Rishi Kumar in 2019

== Notes ==
Footnotes

Citations
