= Arthur Hammond =

Arthur Hammond may refer to:

- Arthur George Hammond (1843–1919), British Army colonel, English recipient of the Victoria Cross
- Arthur L. Hammond, American missionary in Cambodia
- Arthur William Hammond (1890–1959), British World War I flying ace
- Arthur Verney Hammond (1892–1982), British Indian Army officer
- Arthur Hammond (director), Canadian documentary filmmaker

== See also ==
- Arthur Henry Knighton-Hammond (1875–1970)
- Arthur Hammond Marshall, English author, publisher and journalist
