= Cyril Lomax =

British Army general (1893–1973)

Major-General Cyril Lomax CB CBE DSO** MC
- Born: 28 June 1893; Kings Norton, Worcestershire, England
- Died: 30 August 1973 (aged 80); Ferring, West Sussex, England
- Military career
- Allegiance: United Kingdom
- Branch: British Army
- Service years: 1912–1949
- Rank: Major-General
- Nickname: "Sunny"
- Service number: 4970
- Unit: Welch Regiment
- Commands: East Anglian District; 26th Indian Infantry Division; 16th Infantry Brigade; Delhi Independent Brigade Area; 2nd Battalion, Welch Regiment; 21st Battalion, Manchester Regiment
- Conflicts: First World War; Arab revolt in Palestine; Second World War
- Awards: Companion of the Order of the Bath; Commander of the Order of the British Empire; Distinguished Service Order & Two Bars; Military Cross; Mentioned in Despatches (2); War Cross of Military Valor (Italy)

Major-General Cyril Ernest Napier Lomax, CB, CBE, DSO & Two Bars, MC (28 June 1893 – 30 August 1973) was an officer in the British Army during the First World War and Second World War. During the latter he commanded the 16th Infantry Brigade in North Africa and the Middle East, and later commanded the 26th Indian Infantry Division in the Burma Campaign, gaining the approval of Field Marshal Sir William Slim.

== Early life and First World War ==
Born in Kings Norton, Worcestershire, on 28 June 1893, Lomax was the eldest of three sons of Daniel Alexander Napier Lomax, who was killed at the Battle of Driefontein on 10 March 1900, and his wife Emma Annette. His youngest brother, Victor, was born a few days later on 16 March. His father left an estate valued at £19,279, nearly all to his wife and children. In 1902, his mother married secondly Francis Towle. Cyril Lomax was educated at Marlborough College and the Royal Military College, Sandhurst, from where he was commissioned as a second lieutenant into the Welch Regiment of the British Army in September 1912. He was posted to the regiment's 2nd Battalion, then serving in Bordon, Hampshire, as part of the 3rd Infantry Brigade of the 1st Division.

Shortly after the First World War began in August 1914 (see British entry into World War I) Lomax's battalion, along with the rest of the division, was sent to France, arriving at Le Havre on 14 August. He was promoted to lieutenant on 1 November, and served with his battalion throughout 1915 and 1916. In August 1916 Lomax was appointed second-in-command of the 20th (Service) Battalion, Manchester Regiment, a Kitchener's Army unit, which came with the rank of temporary major. He was promoted to temporary lieutenant colonel in June 1917 to command the battalion. He was mentioned in dispatches five times throughout the war. He had also been awarded the Military Cross (MC) in January 1917, as well as the Distinguished Service Order (DSO) for his actions during October 1918, when the war was coming to its end. The citation for his DSO appeared in The London Gazette in October 1919 and reads as follows:

Throughout the operations extending from 4th to 12th October, 1918, he displayed marked gallantry and power of command. He led his battalion in the attack on Ponchaux, when they successfully stormed and captured the second objective. Later, when the attack on Honnechy was held up, he went forward and consulted with the commanding officers of the battalions in front of him, with the result that a fresh attack was successfully launched. He did excellent work throughout.

In addition to his British decorations, he was also awarded the Italian Croci de Guerra for his service on the Italian front.

== Between the wars ==
With the war now over due to the armistice of 11 November 1918, Lomax left the 21st (Service) Battalion of the Manchester Regiment in June 1919 and reverted from the temporary rank of lieutenant colonel to his substantive rank of captain. In December 1919 he was appointed adjutant of the Welch Regiment.

In April 1923, Lomax relinquished his appointment as adjutant of the 3rd Battalion, and returned to his regiment. In March 1924 he was appointed adjutant of the 6th (Territorial) Battalion, Welch Regiment. In March 1928 Lomax finished his spell as the battalion’s adjutant.

In November 1932, Lomax was promoted to major and in January 1935 he was made a brevet lieutenant colonel. He was promoted to lieutenant colonel in November 1936 and given command of the 2nd Battalion of his regiment in India.

From March to October 1938, Lomax also commanded the Delhi Independent Brigade Area, with a local rank of brigadier. He was promoted full colonel in July 1939, and was given command of 16th Infantry Brigade, taking over from Brigadier John Evetts, in Palestine, during the final stages of the Arab revolt in Palestine, with the temporary rank of brigadier.

== Second World War ==
In September 1940, a year after the Second World War began, Lomax's brigade was sent to Egypt to join the Western Desert Force. For Operation Compass in December the brigade was attached to the Indian 4th Infantry Division which had been short a brigade. They saw action in a successful attack on the Italian positions at Sidi Barrani. In mid-December the 4th Indian Division was sent to East Africa and 16th Brigade most of the ensuing period in reserve until mid February when it was withdrawn back to Egypt to join the reforming 6th Infantry Division. For his services from December 1940 to February 1941 Lomax was appointed a Commander of the Order of the British Empire (CBE).

The 16th Brigade was ordered forward in mid-June 1941 as reinforcement to the forces advancing north against Vichy-controlled Syria and Lebanon. They experienced hard fighting until the Vichy surrender on 11 July. For his services from February to July 1941 he was awarded a second bar to his DSO.

In September, the 70th Infantry Division (as the re-designated 6th Infantry Division was now known) was shipped to Tobruk to replace the besieged 9th Australian Division. During Operation Crusader the brigade's battalions were involved in the break-out from Tobruk to link with the 2nd New Zealand Division on the night of 26 November. However, a permanent relief of Tobruk was not achieved until a week later.

In February 1942, following the Empire of Japan's entry into the war on the side of the Axis powers, the 70th Division was ordered to India to bolster its defences. The 16th Brigade set off in March but following the fall of Singapore the previous month, the Royal Navy's most important remaining base in the East at Trincomalee in Ceylon was felt to be under threat from the Japanese and the brigade was diverted to Ceylon where it was attached to the 34th Indian Infantry Division. Lomax was appointed Fortress Commander in June and given the rank of acting major-general in July.

In March 1943, Lomax travelled to India to take command of the 26th Indian Infantry Division. He was immediately ordered to the Arakan to replace Major-General Wilfrid Lewis Lloyd who had incurred the displeasure of his superior, Lieutenant-General Noel Irwin, commanding Eastern Command. Part of the problem had been that, after an encouraging start, the campaign had gone into reverse and Irwin had committed more and more brigades until Lloyd's divisional headquarters had ended up with nine brigades under command, far too many to control effectively. Finally Irwin introduced Indian XV Corps headquarters under Lieutenant-General William "Bill" Slim to take control. By 8 May after heavy fighting the British were back to the point they had started at the previous December but the front had been stabilised. Slim later wrote of Lomax:

Never had a divisional commander, immediately on taking over a strange formation, in a new type of war, been confronted by a more desperate situation. I was filled with admiration for the way in which he took hold. Wherever he went, he inspired confidence by his steadiness, decision and obvious competence.

In October 1943, Slim was made commander of the newly created Fourteenth Army and Lomax spent a month as an acting lieutenant general in charge of XV Corps pending the arrival of the new commander, Lieutenant-General Philip Christison.

When the Japanese launched their HA-GO offensive in February 1944, Indian XV Corps had Indian 5th and 7th Infantry Divisions forward with the British 36th Infantry Division and Lomax's Indian 26th Infantry Division pulled back in reserve. The Japanese tactic was to infiltrate to cut off the forward divisions' line of supply and so force their capitulation. The Fourteenth Army commander had anticipated this and ordered that the forward divisions should fight where they stood and be supplied by air. Meanwhile, the reserve divisions were to fight their way forward and so crush the Japanese between them. By mid March, the 26th Indian Division, with responsibility for the eastern half of the front, had linked up with the 7th Indian Division. Heavy fighting continued as XV Corps strove to take the important Maundaw-Buthidaung road. Finally, on 5 May, Lomax's division captured Point 551, the key hill, to seal the victory. Lomax's rank of major-general was made substantive in December 1944.

In January 1945, Lomax was given the task of capturing Ramree Island. After landing two brigades on the north end of the island on 21 and 22 January, they had fought their way south to Ramree town by 9 February and resistance ceased by 17 February.

Having by now commanded his division for almost two years, with much of the previous year spent fighting, Lomax was rested and saw no further action before the war came to an end.

== Post-war ==
Returning to Britain, Lomax became GOC East Anglian District. His final assignment was as President of the No. 1 Commissions Board, relinquishing the appointment in August 1949 and retiring from the army the following month. In retirement, he maintained his links with the army as honorary colonel of 44th Infantry Division Signals Regiment, a Territorial Army unit, from 1948 until 1950 and was Colonel of the Welch Regiment from 1949 until 1958.

Together with John de Courcy, Lomax wrote a history of the Welch Regiment for the years 1919–1951, which was published in 1952.

== Personal ==
In August 1918, Lomax married Irene Doris Burgoyne Doyley. Their son Peter Francis Napier Lomax, a pilot officer with No. 229 Squadron RAF, died on 24 February 1940.

== Bibliography ==
- Mead, Richard (2007). Churchill's Lions: A Biographical Guide to the Key British Generals of World War II. Stroud: Spellmount. ISBN 978-1-86227-431-0.
- Smart, Nick (2005). Biographical Dictionary of British Generals of the Second World War. Barnsley, South Yorkshire: Pen and Sword Books. ISBN 1844150496.

Military offices
Preceded by Wilfrid Lloyd	GOC 14th Indian Infantry Division; April 1943	Succeeded by Alfred Curtis
Preceded by Thomas Heywood	GOC 26th Indian Infantry Division; 1943–1945	Succeeded by Henry Chambers
Preceded by Colin Callander (as GOC 54th (East Anglian) Infantry Division)	GOC East Anglian District; 1946–1948	Succeeded by Maurice Chilton
Honorary titles
Preceded by Douglas Dickinson	Colonel of the Welch Regiment; 1949–1958	Succeeded by Sir Charles Coleman
