= 71st Indian Infantry Brigade =

- Active: 1942–1945
- Country: (British Raj) British India
- Allegiance: British Empire
- Branch: British Indian Army
- Type: Infantry
- Size: Brigade
- Engagements: Burma Campaign

Commanders
- Notable commanders: Brigadier R C Cotterell-Hill; Brigadier H M Chambers; Brigadier H P L Hutchinson

The 71st Indian Infantry Brigade was an infantry brigade formation of the Indian Army during World War II. The brigade was formed in March 1942, at Nowshera in India. The brigade was assigned to the 26th Indian Infantry Division on formation. Then from February to March 1943, during the Arakan Campaign 1942–1943, it was with the 14th Indian Infantry Division and was part of Mayforce which was created to control operations in the Mayu River valley, separated from the main body of the division by a rugged hill range. The brigade returned to the 26th Indian Division in May 1943, until the end of the war.

== Formation ==
- 1st Battalion, Lincolnshire Regiment to August 1945
- 7th Battalion, 15th Punjab Regiment March 1942 to July 1943
- 9th Battalion, 15th Punjab Regiment March 1942 to August 1943
- 1st Battalion, 17th Dogra Regiment March to May 1943
- 10th Battalion, Lancashire Fusiliers April to May 1943
- 2nd Battalion, 8th Punjab Regiment May 1943
- 8th Battalion, 13th Frontier Force Rifles May 1943
- 1st Battalion, 18th Royal Garhwal Rifles August 1943 to August 1945
- 5th Battalion, 1st Punjab Regiment August 1943 to August 1945
- 6th Battalion, South Wales Borderers July to August 1945

== See also ==
- List of Indian Army Brigades in World War II
