= Arakan Campaign =

Arakan Campaign may refer to:

- Arakan campaign (February–April 1825), in the First Anglo-Burmese War
- Second World War:
  - Arakan Campaign 1942–43
  - Arakan Campaign 1943-1944
  - Arakan Campaign 1944-1945
