= 26th Indian Infantry Division =

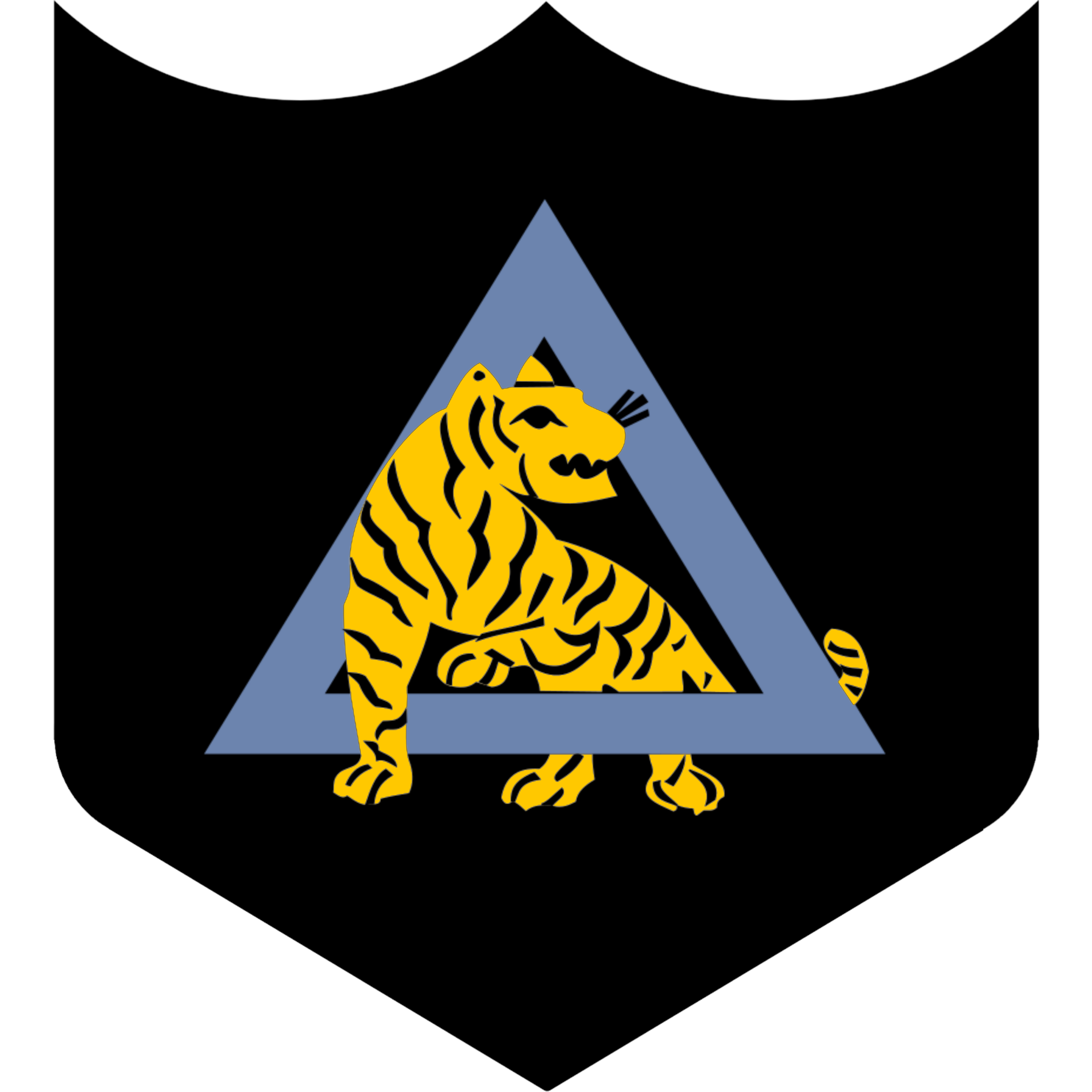
- Formation sign of the 26th Indian Infantry Division.
- Active: 1942–1945
- Country: (British Raj) British India
- Allegiance: British Empire
- Branch: British Indian Army
- Type: Infantry
- Size: Division
- Nickname: Tiger Head Division
- Engagements: Burma Campaign

Commanders
- Notable commanders: Field Marshal S. H. F. J. Manekshaw; Maj Gen C. E. N. Lomax; Maj Gen H. M. Chambers

The 26th Indian Infantry Division, was an infantry division of the Indian Army during World War II. It fought in the Burma Campaign.

== History ==
When the Japanese invaded Burma in 1942, the various units in training or stationed around Barrackpur near Calcutta in India were hastily formed into the "Calcutta" Division on 20 March 1942. On 15 May, the division was retitled the Indian 26th Division. The division's badge was a Bengal tiger stepping through a blue triangle, representing the "delta" of the Ganges River, on a black background.

For much of 1942, the division was heavily engaged in internal security, and not regarded as battle-worthy due to lack of training and transport. It formed part of Indian XV Corps, but late in 1942, it was taken over directly by Eastern Army.

For the First Arakan offensive, all the division's brigades were detached one by one and committed to the offensive under the 14th Indian Infantry Division. In March, the offensive stalled and the HQ of 26th Division relieved that of the 14th Division, taking over the Arakan front too late to prevent a minor disaster. After this the British fell back almost to their starting point on the Indian frontier.

Once reorganised, the division was in reserve for the first part of the Second Arakan Offensive, once again under XV Corps. When a Japanese counter-attack at Ngakyedauk cut off the forward troops, 26th Division was deployed to relieve them. It fought down the coastal plain to reopen the roads by which the 5th Indian Division was supplied.

After the battle ended with the repulse of the Japanese attackers, the division took over the 5th Division's front and took part in the capture of two vital railway tunnels. After this, the Arakan offensive wound down to spare troops and resources for the battles in Manipur. The division was withdrawn during the monsoon rains to recuperate.

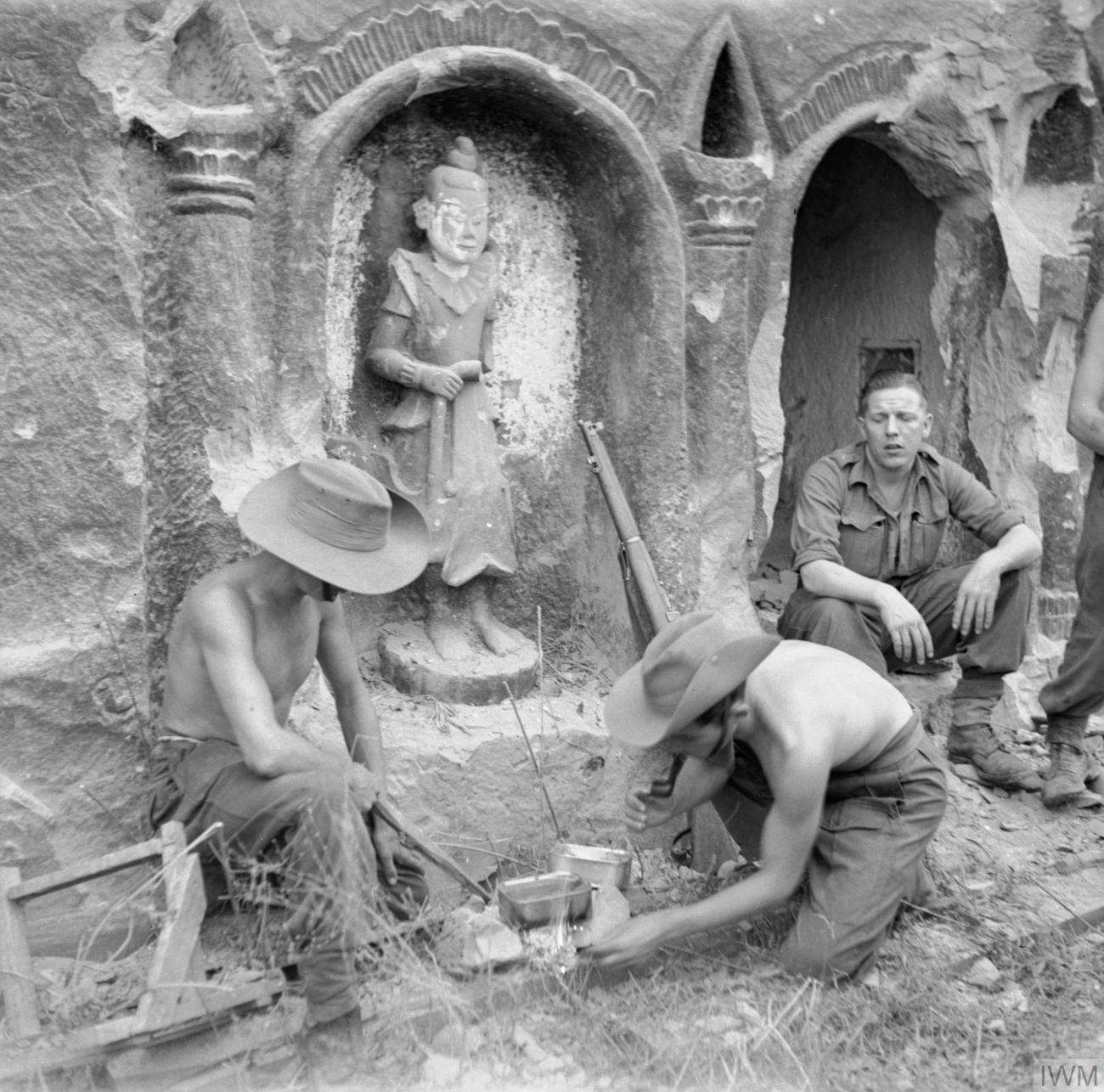
Men of the 26th Indian Infantry Division preparing a meal beside a temple on Ramree Island, January 1945.

Beginning in late 1944, the division was committed once again to the Arakan. During the Third Arakan Offensive and subsequent operations, 26th Division took part mainly in amphibious operations, including the unopposed capture of Akyab Island, and the Battle of Ramree Island. Finally in April and May 1945, the division took part in Operation Dracula, the capture of Rangoon.

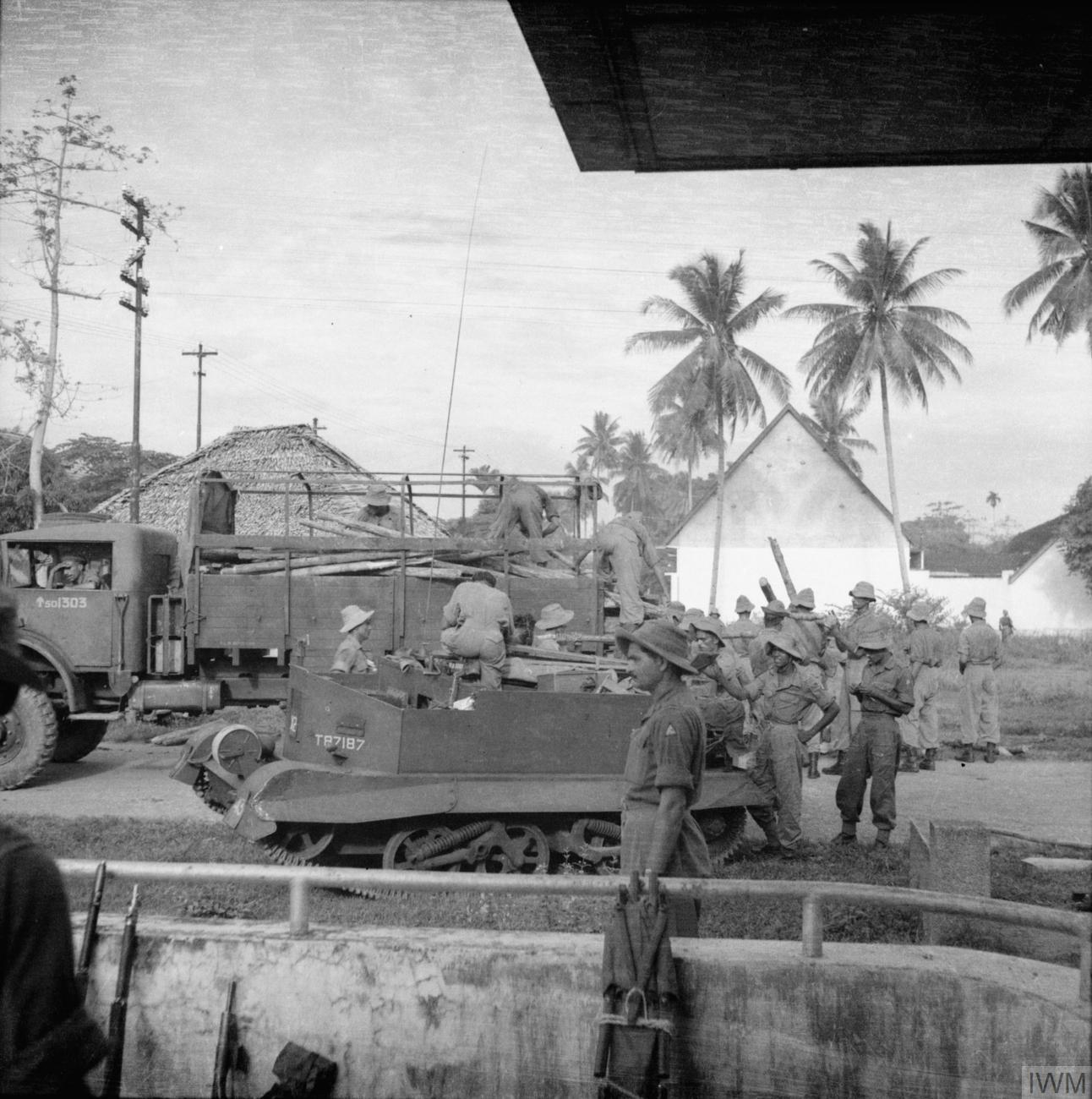
Troops of the 26th Indian Division unload material from their vehicles just outside Medan in Sumatra.

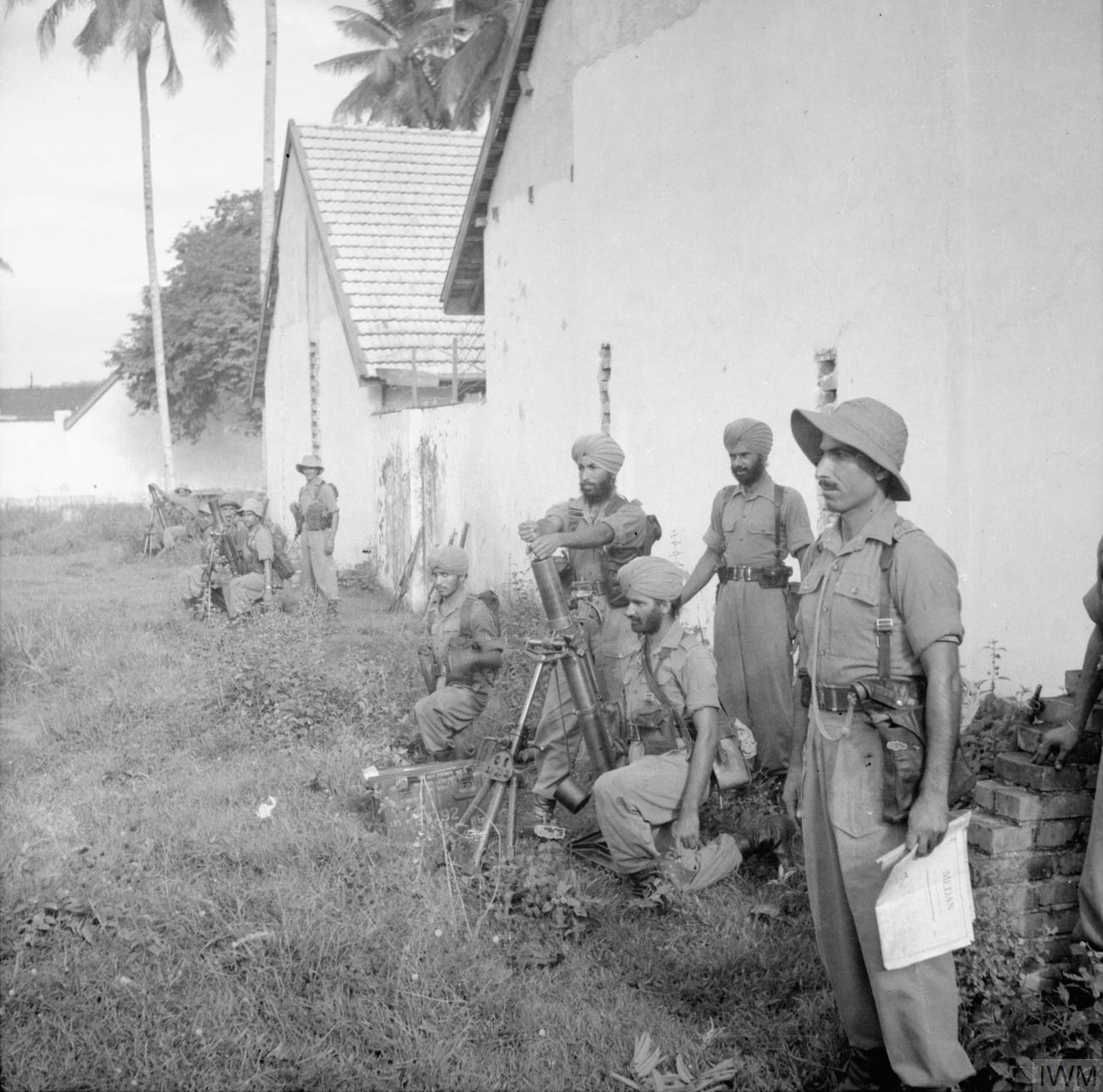
Troops of the 26th Indian Division man mortars just outside Medan in Sumatra.

After the Japanese surrender, the division, under the command of Henry Chambers, reinforced other troops in Java and Sumatra, where the end of the war brought widespread disorder. The division was formally disbanded in India on 31 August 1945, but most of its units were stationed in Sumatra at Padang and Medan until November 1946, when they embarked at the port of Belawan to be disbanded in India.

== Order of battle ==
as of 1 April 1944

4th Indian Infantry Brigade
1st Battalion, Wiltshire Regiment
2nd Battalion, 7th Rajput Regiment
2nd Battalion, 13th Frontier Force Rifles

36th Indian Infantry Brigade
5th Battalion, 16th Punjab Regiment
8th Battalion, 13th Frontier Force Rifles
1st Battalion, 8th Gurkha Rifles

71st Indian Infantry Brigade
1st Battalion, Lincolnshire Regiment
5th Battalion, 1st Punjab Regiment
1st Battalion, 18th Royal Garhwal Rifles

Divisional Troops
12th Battalion, 12th Frontier Force Regiment (divisional machine gun battalion)

160th (Jungle) Field Regiment Royal Artillery
20th Mountain Regiment Royal Indian Artillery

72nd, 28th, 98th Field Companies, Royal Indian Engineers
128th Field Park Company Indian Engineers

44th, 48th, 51st, 58th, Animal Transport Companies, IASC
44th, 75th, 166th, General Purpose Transport Companies, IASC

1st, 46th, 48th, Indian Field Ambulances, IAMC

26th Indian Division Provost Unit
26th Indian Division Signals Unit

54th, 55th Indian Workshop Companies, IEME
26th Indian Division Recovery Unit, IEME

== Assigned brigades ==
All these brigades were assigned or attached to the division at some time during World War II

- 71st Indian Infantry Brigade
- 109th Indian Infantry Brigade
- 4th Indian Infantry Brigade
- 36th Indian Infantry Brigade
- British 6th Infantry Brigade
- British 23rd Infantry Brigade
- 55th Indian Infantry Brigade
- British 14th Infantry Brigade
- 114th Indian Infantry Brigade
- British 29th Infantry Brigade
- 2nd (West Africa) Infantry Brigade
- 22nd (East Africa) Infantry Brigade

== Bibliography ==
- Cole, Howard (1973). Formation Badges of World War 2. Britain, Commonwealth and Empire. London: Arms and Armour Press.
