= Battle of Arakan =

Battle of Arakan may refer to:

- Arakan Campaign 1825, a British offensive in the First Anglo-Burmese War
- Arakan Campaign 1942–43, or the First Arakan Offensive, a Second World War Allied campaign to retake Arakan
- Arakan Campaign 1943–1944, or the Second Arakan Offensive, a second Allied attempt to retake Arakan
- Arakan Campaign 1944–1945, or the Third Arakan Offensive, a third Allied attempt to retake Arakan
