= 88th Indian Infantry Brigade =

- Active: 1942–1943
- Country: (British Raj) British India
- Allegiance: British Empire
- Branch: British Indian Army
- Part of: 14th Indian Infantry Division
- Garrison/HQ: Chittagong
- Engagements: Burma Campaign

Commanders
- Notable commanders: Lechmere Thomas

The 88th Indian Infantry Brigade was an infantry brigade formation of the Indian Army during World War II. It was formed in September 1942, at Chittagong to protect the 14th Indian Infantry Division's lines of communications and was disbanded on 8 May 1943. It was commanded by Brigadier Lechmere Thomas.

== Formation ==
- 5th Battalion, 9th Jat Regiment September 1942 to April 1943
- 1st Battalion, 16th Punjab Regiment September 1942 to February 1943
- 14th Battalion, 12th Frontier Force Regiment October 1942 to May 1943

== See also ==
- List of Indian Army Brigades in World War II
