= 64th Indian Infantry Brigade =

- Active: 1942–1945
- Country: British India
- Allegiance: British Crown
- Branch: British Indian Army
- Size: Brigade
- Engagements: Burma Campaign

Commanders
- Notable commanders: Brigadier H M Chambers; Brigadier G A Bain; Brigadier C Dalby; Lieutenant-Colonel O C T Dykes; Brigadier J G Flewett; Colonel S M Shrinagesh

The 64th Indian Infantry Brigade was an Infantry formation of the Indian Army during World War II. It was formed in February 1942, at Babina in India and assigned to the 23rd Indian Infantry Division. The brigade was transferred in March 1942, to the 19th Indian Infantry Division and fought in the Burma Campaign. The brigade remained under command 19th Division until the end of the war.

== Formation ==
- 5th Battalion, 10th Baluch Regiment February 1942 to August 1945
- 1st Battalion, 6th Queen Elizabeth's Own Gurkha Rifles February 1942 to November 1944 and December 1944 to August 1945
- 2nd Battalion, Worcestershire Regiment August 1942 to August 1945
- 1st Battalion, 15th Punjab Regiment March 1945 and July to August 1945
- 2nd Battalion, Royal Berkshire Regiment March 1945
- 32nd Anti Tank Regiment, Royal Artillery March 1945
- 8th Battalion, 12th Frontier Force Regiment March 1945
- 115th Field Regiment, Royal Artillery March 1945
- 134th Field Regiment, Royal Artillery March 1945
- 1st Battalion, 19th Hyderabad Regiment July to August 1945
- 6th Battalion, 15th Punjab Regiment July to August 1945
- MG Battalion, 13th Frontier Force Rifles July to August 1945

== See also ==
- List of Indian Army Brigades in World War II
