= Lechmere Thomas =

British Army general

Major-General Lechmere Thomas CB CBE DSO & Bar MC & Bar
- Thomas in 1927
- Born: 20 October 1897; Guildford, Surrey, England
- Died: 9 May 1981 (aged 83); Saint Peter, Jersey
- Military career
- Allegiance: United Kingdom
- Branch: British Army
- Service years: 1915–1948
- Rank: Major-General
- Service number: 12601
- Units: East Surrey Regiment; Royal Northumberland Fusiliers
- Commands: 36th Indian Infantry Brigade (1943–1945); 88th Indian Infantry Brigade (1942–1943); 1st Battalion, Wiltshire Regiment (1942); 9th Battalion, Royal Northumberland Fusiliers (1940–1942); 2nd Battalion, King's African Rifles (1934–1939)
- Conflicts: First World War; Iraqi revolt against the British; Second World War
- Awards: Companion of the Order of the Bath; Commander of the Order of the British Empire; Distinguished Service Order & Bar; Military Cross & Bar; Mentioned in Despatches

Major-General Lechmere Cay Thomas, CB, CBE, DSO & Bar, MC & Bar (20 October 1897 – 9 May 1981) was a senior British Army officer who fought in both the First and Second World Wars.

== Military career ==
Thomas was the son of Kempson Thomas and he was educated at Cranleigh School. In 1915 he was mobilised as a member of the Territorial Force, serving in the East Surrey Regiment in France and Belgium. On 29 November 1915 he received a temporary commission in his regiment. On 12 March 1917 he was awarded the Military Cross (MC) for gallantry for leading a successful raid on German lines. The medal's citation reads:

For conspicuous gallantry and devotion to duty. He led a successful raid with great gallantry, and personally accounted for four of the enemy. Later, he skilfully withdrew his party under heavy fire.

He was awarded a Bar to his MC in February 1918.

Following the end of the First World War, Thomas served in the war in Iraq, during which he was wounded, and on 2 March 1921 he received a permanent commission in the Royal Northumberland Fusiliers. Between 1925 and 1927 he served with the King's African Rifles (KAR), before being seconded to the Sudan Defence Force until 1929. Thomas then returned to the KAR as adjutant and was commanding officer of 2nd Battalion, KAR from 1934 to 1939. In January 1939 he was appointed an Officer of the Order of the British Empire.

During the Second World War, Thomas saw active service in France, Malaya, and Burma. He was commanding officer of the 9th Battalion, Royal Northumberland Fusiliers from 1940 to 1942. On 22 October 1940 he awarded the Distinguished Service Order (DSO). In February, as a lieutenant colonel, Thomas took command of an ad hoc formation called "Tomforce" made up of troops from the 18th Infantry Division during the Battle of Singapore. Later in 1942, Thomas commanded 1st Battalion, Wiltshire Regiment and from September 1942 to April 1943 he was in command of the 88th Indian Infantry Brigade during the Burma Campaign. Between 1943 and 1945 he commanded the 36th Indian Infantry Brigade. In 1945 he was appointed a Commander of the Order of the British Empire and awarded a Bar to his DSO, ending the war as a colonel.

Between 1945 and 1947 Thomas served as inspector general of the British Army in Burma, before serving as general officer commanding of the army in Burma until 1948. That year he was appointed a Companion of the Order of the Bath. He retired in August 1948 and was granted the honorary rank of major general.
