= 49th Indian Infantry Brigade =

- Active: 1941–1945
- Country: (British Raj) British India
- Allegiance: British Empire
- Branch: British Indian Army
- Type: Infantry
- Size: Brigade
- Engagements: Burma Campaign

Commanders
- Notable commanders: R D Whitehill; W B Thomas; F A Esse; C H B Rodham; A W S Mallaby

The 49th Indian Infantry Brigade was an infantry brigade formation of the Indian Army during World War II. It was formed in October 1941 at Bolarum in India. It was assigned to the 19th Indian Infantry Division. The brigade fought in the Burma Campaign and moved between a number of infantry divisions. It was with the 14th Indian Infantry Division between March and May in 1942, the 23rd Indian Infantry Division between May 1942 and March 1944, the 17th Indian Infantry Division between March and April 1944 and the served with the 23rd Indian Division until the end of the war. The Brigade is currently a reserve formation on the Western Front.

== Formation ==
- 1st Battalion, 17th Dogra Regiment October 1941 to May 1942
- 2nd Battalion, 19th Hyderabad Regiment November 1941 to November 1942
- 5th Battalion, 6th Rajputana Rifles November 1941 to August 1945
- Kalibahadur Regiment, Nepal May to September 1942
- Shere Regiment, Nepal May to September 1942
- 4th Battalion, 5th Mahratta Light Infantry June 1942 to August 1945
- 6th Battalion, 5th Mahratta Light Infantry November 1942 to August 1945
- 9th Battalion, 12th Frontier Force Regiment May 1944

== See also ==
- List of Indian Army Brigades in World War II
