= Aubertin Walter Sothern Mallaby =

British Indian Army officer (1899–1945)

Brigadier Aubertin Walter Sothern Mallaby CIE OBE
- Mallaby on his wedding day, 9 April 1935
- Born: 12 December 1899; United Kingdom of Great Britain and Ireland
- Died: 30 October 1945 (aged 45); Surabaya, Indonesia
- Burial place: Jakarta, Indonesia
- Military career
- Allegiance: British India; United Kingdom
- Branch: British Indian Army
- Service years: 1918–1945
- Rank: Major General (posthumous)
- Units: 27th Punjabis; 15th Punjab Regiment
- Commands: 49th Indian Infantry Brigade
- Conflicts: World War I; World War II; Indonesian National Revolution; Battle of Surabaya †

Brigadier Aubertin Walter Sothern Mallaby CIE OBE (12 December 1899 – 30 October 1945) was a British Indian Army officer who was killed in a shootout during the Battle of Surabaya in what was then the newly proclaimed as independent Republic of Indonesia during the Indonesian National Revolution. At the time of his death, Mallaby was the Commanding Officer (CO) of the 49th Indian Infantry Brigade. Mallaby's death became a major event of hostilities in Surabaya surrounding Indonesian independence, triggering a retaliatory military action by the 5th Indian Infantry Division.

== Biography ==
Mallaby was born to actor and acting company manager William Calthorpe Mallaby (né William Calthorpe Deeley — his father insisted on a stage name; d. 1912) and Katharine Mary Francis, daughter of George Miller, CB, Assistant Secretary of the Board of Education (son of Rev. Sir Thomas Combe Miller, 6th Baronet) on 12 December 1899. His younger brother was the public servant George Mallaby, British High Commissioner to New Zealand from 1957 to 1959.

Mallaby attended Brighton College and then Wellington Cadet College in India before being commissioned as a Second Lieutenant, initially on the Unattached List, Indian Army on 1 October 1918 before being gazetted to the 27th Punjabis on 8 October. He transferred to the 67th Punjabis (later 1st battalion, 2nd Punjab regiment) on 20 July 1919 and promoted lieutenant on 1 October 1919. He served in Waziristan between 1921 and 1924. He received promotion to captain on 1 October 1924.

Mallaby attended Camberley Staff College between 1930–1931 and was appointed a General Staff Officer, 3rd grade on 5 February 1933, being promoted to General Staff Officer, 2nd grade (for RAF co-operation duties), on 1 April 1933. This appointment lasted until 4 February 1937. He was promoted brevet major on 1 July 1935 and substantive major on 1 October 1936.

He was appointed a General Staff Officer, 2nd grade at the War Office in London on 1 March 1938 (being promoted war substantive Lt-Col on 15 August 1941), later being appointed Deputy Director of Military Operation in the rank of Brigadier and remained at the War Office until 1942. He was appointed an Officer of the Most Excellent Order of the British Empire OBE as Major, temporary Lt-Col, acting Brigadier.

Mallaby returned to India and served as major and second in command of the 6th Battalion, 2nd Punjab Regiment, from April to August 1943. In August 1943, he was given command of a battalion of the Hyderabad Regiment but after only 6 weeks in command he was appointed Director of Military Operations at G. H. Q. India with the acting rank of Major General. He was promoted from acting to temporary Major-General and war substantive Colonel on 1 March 1944. In order to obtain operational experience he dropped in rank to temporary Brigadier in July 1944 and was given command of the 49th Indian Infantry Brigade, then serving with the 23rd Indian Division. His substantive (permanent) rank was advanced to lieutenant-colonel in October 1944.

Mallaby was appointed a Companion of The Most Eminent Order of the Indian Empire in the London Gazette of 1 January 1945 as a temporary Brigadier.

He led the 49th Indian Infantry Brigade (part of the 5th Indian Division) to Indonesia in the middle of the national revolution, to find and repatriate former Japanese prisoners of war. He arrived in Surabaya on 25 October 1945. Upon landing, he sent Captain Douglas MacDonald to contact the leader of the revolutionaries, Moestopo; Moestopo stated that they would not oppose the British forces. Mallaby and his brigade worked under constant supervision by the Indonesians, whom he later told that he was focused on finding the POWs.

However, the situation became more heated on 27 October after Mallaby interpreted pamphlets demanding the immediate surrender of the Indonesians' weapons, signed by General Douglas Hawthorn, as an order. Communications were broken between Mallaby's forces and the Indonesians, and the following day the Indonesians began launching attacks on the 49th Brigade. To quench the fighting, Mallaby was able to contact General Hawthorn through an intermediary and arrange a meeting between himself and President Sukarno, where they negotiated a ceasefire.

=== Death ===
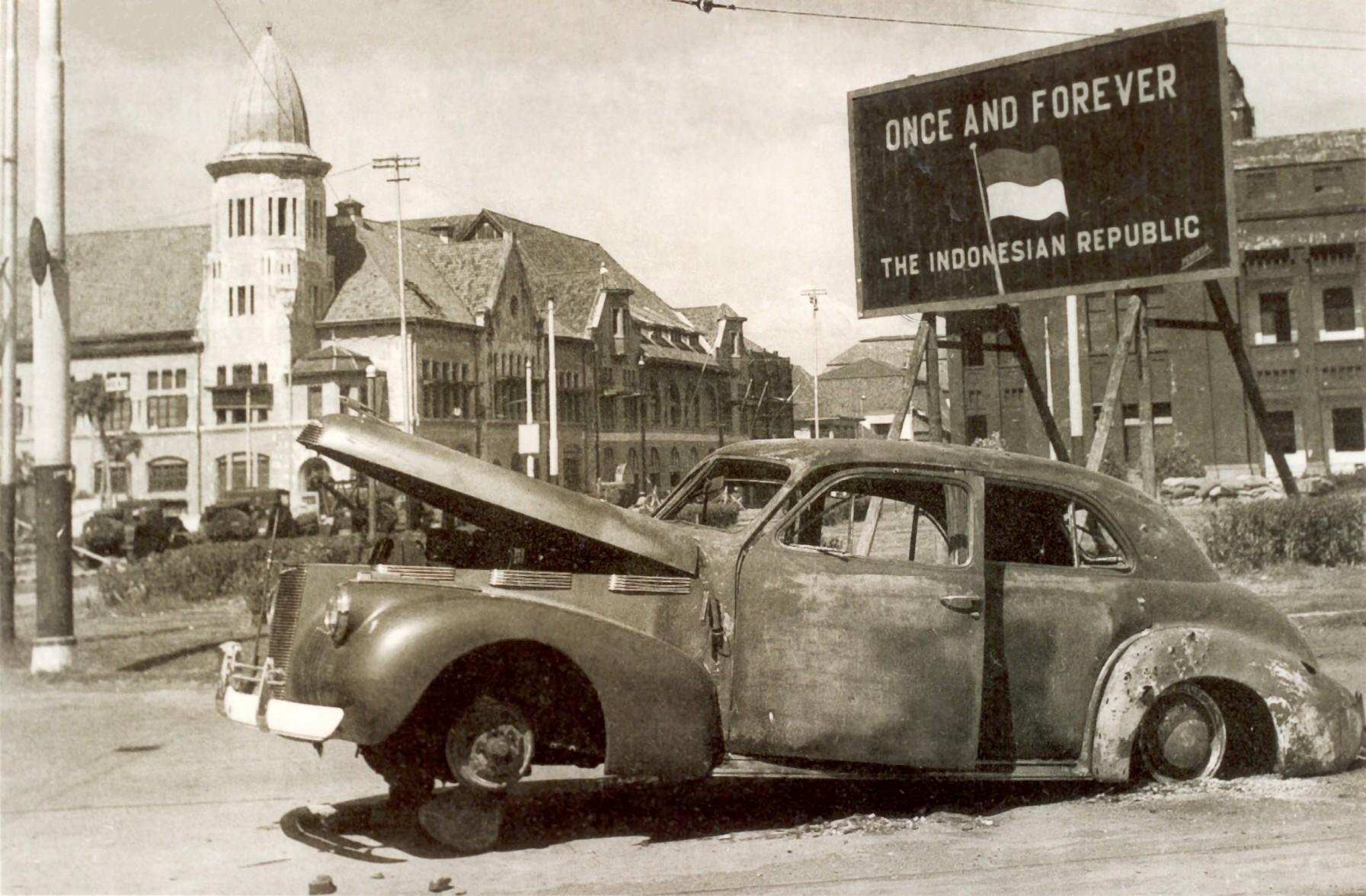
The burnt-out car of Brigadier Mallaby where he was killed on 30 October 1945.

Mallaby was killed on 30 October 1945. At the time, he was travelling about Surabaya under a white flag to spread the news about the ceasefire agreement and rescue some stranded Mahratta troops, despite being warned of the danger by Force 136 troops. When his car approached the British troops' post in the International building near the Jembatan Merah ("Red Bridge"), his car was surrounded by Indonesian Republican militia. Fearing that their commander was about to be attacked, the British troops in the International building, led by Major Venu K. Gopal, fired into the air to disperse the Indonesian militia. The militia, thinking that the British were taking hostile action, fired back at the British troops.

Captain R. C. Smith, who was in the stationary car, reported that a young Republican shot and killed Mallaby after a short conversation. Smith then reported throwing a grenade from the car in the direction of where he thought the shooter had hidden. Although he was not sure whether or not it hit its target, the explosion caused the back seat of the car to ignite. Other accounts, according to the same source, stated that it was the explosion and not a shooter that killed Mallaby.

Whatever the exact circumstances of his demise, Mallaby's death was a significant turning point for the hostilities in Surabaya, and a catalyst for the battle to come. The British ordered an Indonesian surrender, and on 10 November they rolled out a large retaliatory attack. His death also caused the British command to lose trust in the Indonesian politicians.

He received a posthumous Mention In Despatches in April 1946 as a Temporary Brigadier.

Mallaby's killer was an unsolved mystery. Reportedly, his identity was only known by a number of top republicans such as Doel Arnowo and Roeslan Abdulgani. The top republicans however, were displeased to learn of the attack on Mallaby, knowing that his death may result in dire consequence to Surabaya and its residents. They asked the killer to keep silent and told nobody about his involvement in the killing. Although Doel Arnowo admitted in 1970 that a young republican was indeed the killer, his name was not mentioned. Until their deaths, they kept the identity of the killer a secret. 73 years later after the incident, a local Ampel resident, Muhammad Chotib, revealed to the media that his late father, Abdul Aziz a.k.a. Endog (Javanese word of Egg, due to his job as egg seller), was Mallaby's killer. Local Surabaya historian Ady Erlianto Setyawan also confirmed that the possibility of Abdul Aziz being the killer was high, since the claim is also supported by testimony of the last known witness present on the killing site, a Republican journalist of Arab descent, Amak Altuwy.

== Personal life ==
Mallaby married Margaret Catherine Jones (known as Mollie) on 9 April 1935 at St Mark's Church, North Audley Street, London. Mallaby is buried in the Commonwealth War Graves Commission Cemetery in Menteng Pulo, Jakarta. His son, Sir Christopher Mallaby, was later British Ambassador to Germany (1988-1992) and France (1993-1996).

== Views of Mallaby ==
Patrick Heren, writing for Standpoint, notes that Mallaby was considered a "thinking soldier" who preferred discourse over fighting.
