= 109th Indian Infantry Brigade =

- Active: 1942–1945
- Country: (British Raj) British India
- Allegiance: British Empire
- Branch: British Indian Army
- Type: Infantry
- Size: Brigade
- Engagements: World War II: Burma Campaign

Commanders
- Notable commanders: Brigadier W E H Talbot

The 109th Indian Infantry Brigade was an infantry brigade formation of the Indian Army during World War II. The brigade was formed in March 1942 in India, and assigned to the 26th Indian Infantry Division. The brigade was transferred to the 14th Indian Infantry Division and designated as a Jungle Training Brigade in August 1943.

== Formation ==
- 6th Battalion, 9th Jat Regiment
- 9th Battalion, 7th Rajput Regiment
- 16th Battalion, 8th Punjab Regiment
- 6th Battalion, 2nd Punjab Regiment

== See also ==
- List of Indian Army Brigades in World War II
