= William Bain Thomas =

Brigadier William Thomas CBE DSO
- Born: 11 May 1898
- Died: 22 November 1967 (aged 69)
- Military career
- Allegiance: United Kingdom
- Branch: British Army
- Service years: 1916–1952
- Rank: Brigadier
- Unit: Cameronians (Scottish Rifles)
- Commands: 1st Battalion, Cameronians (Scottish Rifles); 49th Indian Infantry Brigade; Army in India Tactical School; Polish Resettlement Corps
- Conflicts: First World War; Arab revolt in Palestine; Second World War
- Awards: Commander of the Order of the British Empire; Companion of the Distinguished Service Order

Brigadier William Bain Thomas CBE DSO (11 May 1898 – 22 November 1967) was a British Army officer who commanded the Polish Resettlement Corps after the Second World War.

== Military career ==
Thomas was educated at the Royal Military College, Sandhurst and commissioned as a second lieutenant into the Cameronians (Scottish Rifles) on 7 April 1916, during the First World War (1914–1918). He served on the Western Front from March 1917 until he was wounded in March 1918.

He remained in the army after the war, during the interwar period, and was posted to India with the 2nd Battalion of the regiment, where he saw action in Kurdistan in 1923 and served as Adjutant, Auxiliary Force India between 1927 and 1930. Thomas then had postings in Egypt and saw active service in the 1936–39 Arab revolt in Palestine. He was promoted to major on 1 August 1938.

In 1940, during the Second World War (1939–1945), Thomas was second-in-command (2IC), 1st Battalion, Cameronians in India, before becoming the Commanding Officer (CO) of the battalion between 1940 and 1942. He saw extensive action during the Burma Campaign and in October 1942 took command of the 49th Indian Infantry Brigade. In the same month he was awarded the Distinguished Service Order for his leadership during the Battle of Yenangyaung. Between May 1943 and December 1945, Thomas was CO, Army in India Tactical School in Poona. He then returned to commanding the 1st Battalion, Cameronians, in which capacity he accepted the surrender of the Japanese general, Shinichi Tanaka, in Singapore on 15 December 1945.

In 1946 Thomas served as commander of the North Malaya Sub-Area in British Malaya, before becoming the commander of the newly formed Polish Resettlement Corps until is disbandment in 1949. In June 1946 he was invested as a Commander of the Order of the British Empire and he retired from the army in February 1952 with the rank of brigadier.

== Family ==
His son was the judge Sir Swinton Barclay Thomas.
