= Polish Resettlement Corps =

Organisation formed by the British Government in 1946

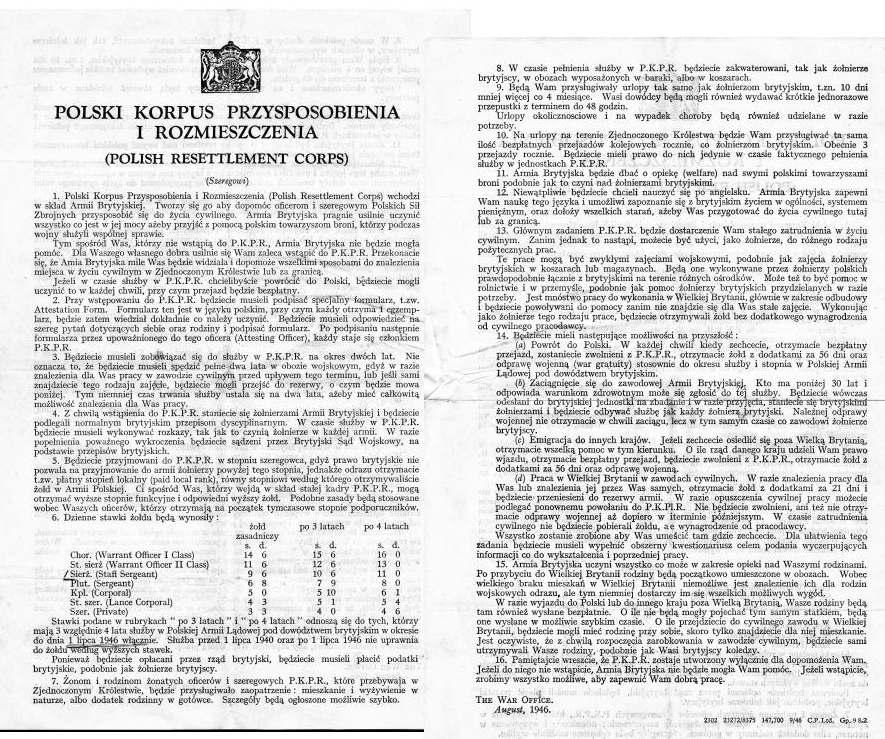
A document (in Polish) written on the Polish Resettlement Corps.

The Polish Resettlement Corps (PRC; Polish: Polski Korpus Przysposobienia i Rozmieszczenia) was an organisation formed by the British Government in 1946 as a holding unit for members of the Polish Armed Forces who had been serving with the British Armed Forces and did not wish to return to a Communist Poland after the end of the Second World War. It was designed to ease their transition from military into civilian life and to keep them under military control until they were fully adjusted to British life. It was mainly run by the British Army. The PRC was disbanded after fulfilling its purpose in 1949.

== Background ==
The Polish Armed Forces in the West had fought alongside the Western Allies (primarily the United Kingdom) since 1939. However, in the aftermath of the "Western betrayal" - the decisions reached at the Yalta Conference and subsequent agreements between the Big Three - the Polish government in exile found itself no longer recognised by the allies; instead the Soviet puppet government, the Polish Committee of National Liberation, assumed control of Poland. With the communist government mounting persecutions against the Polish resistance and the soldiers who fought "in the West", mostly loyal to the government-in-exile and opposed to communism, many Polish soldiers found themselves torn between returning to their homeland and facing persecution or remaining in the west. Many expected a collapse of the communist regime in Poland, and the liberation of Poland via a Third World War between the Western Allies and the Soviets, but instead by 1949 a full-blown Stalinist regime was entrenched in Poland, and showed no signs of weakening. Out of approximately 250,000 Polish soldiers in the West in 1945, 105,000 returned to Poland, but close to 160,000 were still in Western (mostly British) territory.

== The corps ==
The formation of the corps was announced by Foreign Secretary Ernest Bevin on 22 May 1946 and it began recruiting in September 1946. About 160,000 people were eligible to join, the majority of them (110,000) veterans of the Middle East campaigns, many of whom were members of the Polish II Corps. Of these, 22,000 were former prisoners of war. These figures also included 4,000 members of the Polish Navy, 12,000 members of the Polish Air Force, and 1,000 Polish members of the Women's Auxiliary Air Force (WAAF). The corps had a separate Air Wing for the air force personnel, run by the Royal Air Force. Eventually 115,000 Polish personnel would join the PRC programmes. The corps had its headquarters in Witley Camp and was commanded by Brigadier William Bain Thomas and the Polish major-general Stanisław Kopański.

Members of the corps were volunteers. Polish personnel were able to leave the forces and leave the United Kingdom or take up employment within the United Kingdom without joining the corps. They signed up for two years, but could leave the corps at any time, becoming members of the Corps Reserve until their two years were completed. During this time they could, however, be recalled to the corps if it was deemed necessary (e.g. if they were found to be unsuitable for the job they had taken).

Members of the corps were still military personnel and subject to British military discipline and military law. They were accommodated in military camps and paid at the normal British Armed Forces rate for their rank. They were given tuition in English and either given training in trades or employed in useful projects, often on loan to private contractors, which it was hoped would increase their chances of getting a job in civilian life. A sizeable number underwent professional training, including at university level. If possible their dependents were also brought over to the United Kingdom.

Due to the high number of Poles in the PRC, they were seen as significant competition by some British labour leaders. A campaign by the Trades Union Congress and leading trade unions attempted at first to turn public opinion against the Poles, but was eventually unsuccessful.

By 1949 the corps had mostly ceased to function. About 150,000 Polish soldiers and their dependents settled in the United Kingdom, forming a significant part of the Polish community.
