= 4th Indian Infantry Brigade =

- Active: 1939–1945
- Country: British India
- Allegiance: British Crown
- Branch: British Indian Army
- Type: Infantry
- Size: Brigade
- Engagements: Burma Campaign

The 4th Indian Infantry Brigade was an infantry brigade formation of the Indian Army during World War II. It was formed in September 1939, as the 7th Indian Infantry Brigade and renumbered 4th in June 1940, The brigade was assigned to HQ Rawalpindi District on formation. Then posted to the 26th Indian Infantry Division in April 1942. The brigade also served with the 14th Indian Infantry Division between March and April 1943, and them returned to the 26th Division, where it remained for the rest of the war apart from a short attachment with the 82nd (West Africa) Infantry Division in April 1945.

== Formation ==
- 2nd Battalion, 2nd Gurkha Rifles September 1939 to May 1940
- 4th Battalion, Jammu and Kashmir Infantry October 1940 to April 1941
- 3rd Battalion, 9th Gurkha Rifles May 1941 to January 1944
- 2nd Battalion, Jammu and Kashmir Rifles September 1941 to January 1942
- 8th Battalion, 8th Punjab Regiment January 1942 to December 1943 and June to August 1945
- 6th Battalion, 11th Sikh Regiment February 1942 to April 1943 and June to August 1943
- 7th Battalion, 15th Punjab Regiment April to May 1943
- 1st Battalion, Wiltshire Regiment October 1943 to October 1944
- 2nd Battalion, 7th Rajput Regiment December 1943 to August 1945
- 2nd Battalion, 13th Frontier Force Rifles December 1943 to August 1945
- 1st Battalion, 8th Gurkha Rifles May 1944
- 2nd Battalion, Green Howards September 1944 to April 1945
- 1st Anti-Tank Regiment, Indian Artillery March to April 1945
- 160th Field Artillery Regiment, Royal Artillery March to April 1945
- MG Battalion, 12th Frontier Force Regiment March to April 1945
- 1st Battalion, 18th Royal Garhwal Rifles March to April 1945
- 1st Battalion, Royal Warwickshire Regiment April to June 1945
- 72nd Field Company, Indian Engineers March to April 1945

== See also ==
- List of Indian Army Brigades in World War II
