= Henry Chambers (Indian Army officer) =

British Indian Army officer (1897–1967)

Major-General Henry Chambers CBE
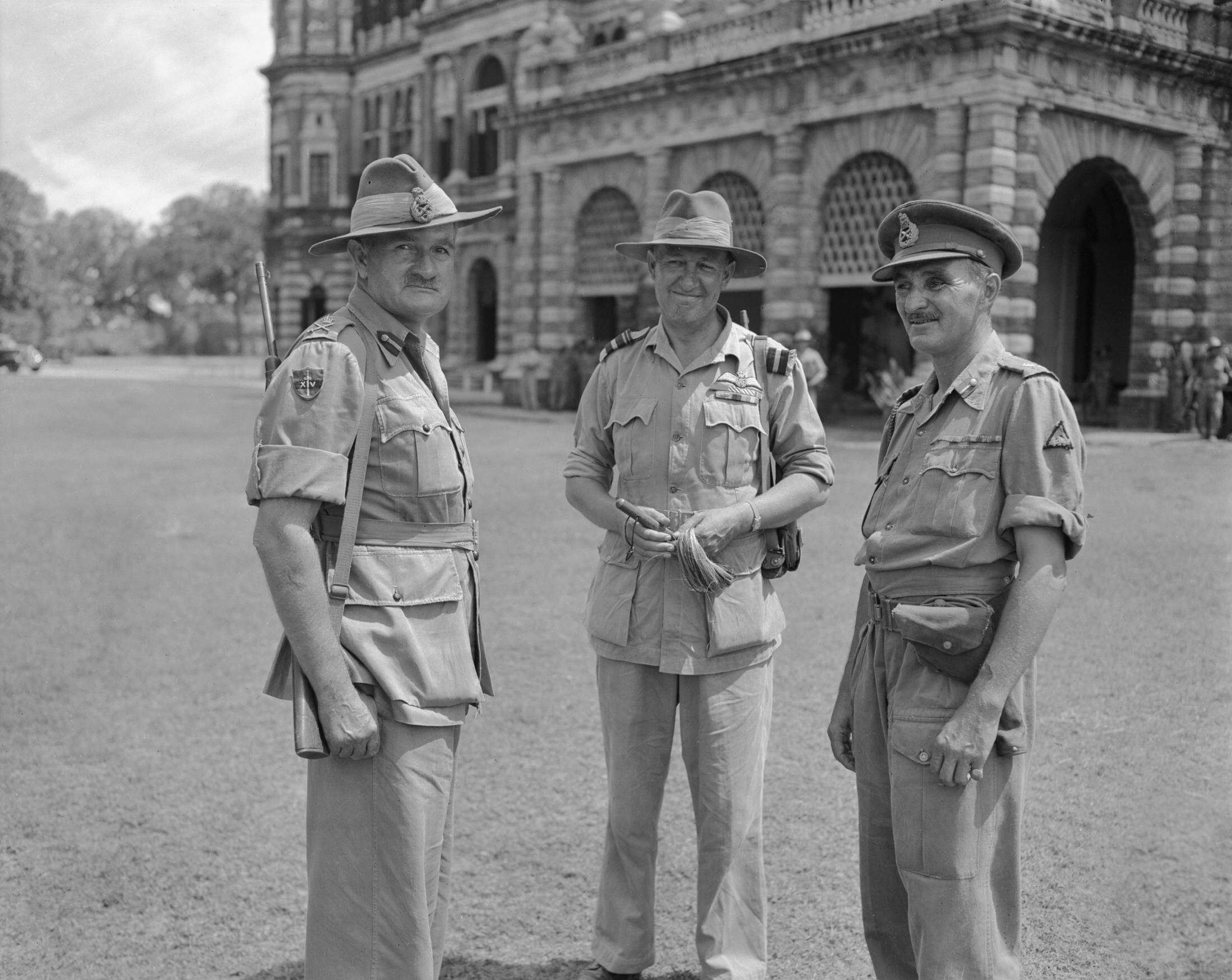
- Lieutenant-General Sir William Slim (GOC-in-Chief 14th Army, left), Air Vice-Marshal Stanley Vincent (AOC 221 Group South East Asia Air Forces, centre) and Major-General Henry Chambers (GOC 26th Indian Division, right) at Government House, Rangoon, 8 May 1945.
- Born: 15 July 1897; Belfast, Ireland
- Died: 1967 (aged 68–69)
- Military career
- Allegiance: United Kingdom
- Branch: British Army; British Indian Army
- Service years: 1914–1948
- Rank: Major-General
- Service number: 9351
- Units: Royal Munster Fusiliers; 117th Mahrattas; 5th Mahratta Light Infantry
- Commands: 26th Indian Infantry Division; 71st Indian Infantry Brigade; 64th Indian Infantry Brigade
- Conflicts: First World War; Second World War
- Awards: Commander of the Order of the British Empire; Mentioned in Despatches (2)

Major-General Henry Maurice Chambers, CBE (15 July 1897 – 1967) was a British Indian Army officer of the Second World War.

== Military career ==
Chambers received a temporary commission in the British Army as a second lieutenant on 26 September 1914 to the Royal Munster Fusiliers. He served at Gallipoli and on the Western Front in the First World War, and on 3 December 1917 he was commissioned a lieutenant into the 117th Mahrattas of the British Indian Army. Chambers was promoted to the rank of captain in June 1919. From 1924 to 1925 he attended the Staff College, Camberley, and between the wars he served in India as a staff officer and became a lieutenant colonel in September 1939.

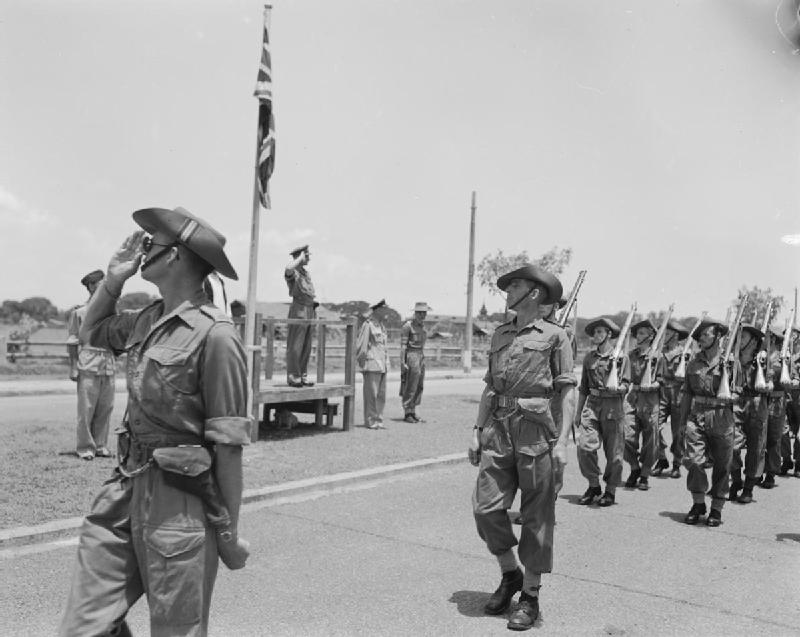
Major General Chambers, GOC 26th Indian Division, takes the salute at the victory parade in Rangoon.

In 1942 Chambers became acting commander of the 64th Indian Infantry Brigade, before serving as a brigadier on the General Staff until 1944. He then became commander of the 71st Indian Infantry Brigade, serving with the brigade during the Burma Campaign. In early 1945 he was made Acting General Officer Commanding of the 26th Indian Infantry Division, before taking permanent command of the division later in the year, serving in Burma and Sumatra. Chambers was twice mentioned in despatches for his actions during the war in the Far East, and in January 1946 he was invested as a Commander of the Order of the British Empire. He retired from the army as a major-general in 1948.

== Family ==
In 1920 Chambers married Aileen Geraldine Olga Allison, with whom he had two sons. They divorced in 1947. He married again in 1954 to Sybil Ismay Siddons. He retired to South Africa.

Military offices
Preceded by Cyril Lomax	GOC 26th Indian Infantry Division; 1945	Robert Cecil Osborne Hedley
