= Robert Cottrell-Hill =

British Army general (1903–1965)

Major-General Robert Cottrell-Hill CB CBE DSO* MC
- Born: Robert Charles Hill; 7 November 1903; Khadki, Maharashtra, India
- Died: 10 November 1965 (aged 62); Oxford, Oxfordshire, England
- Military career
- Allegiance: United Kingdom
- Branch: British Army
- Service years: 1924–1959
- Rank: Major-General
- Service number: 28274
- Unit: Border Regiment
- Commands: 71st Indian Infantry Brigade; British Forces in Berlin
- Conflicts: Arab revolt in Palestine; World War II
- Awards: Companion of the Order of the Bath; Commander of the Order of the British Empire; Distinguished Service Order & Bar; Military Cross; Mentioned in dispatches

Major-General Robert Charles Cottrell-Hill CB CBE DSO* MC (born Robert Charles Hill; 7 November 1903 – 10 November 1965) was Commandant of the British Sector in Berlin.

== Military career ==
Educated at Bedford School and the Royal Military College, Sandhurst, Cottrell-Hill was commissioned into the Border Regiment in 1924. He served with the 1st Battalion, Border Regiment and was awarded the Military Cross (MC) for bravery at El Yamun near Jenin in Palestine, during the Arab revolt, in 1938, and was later mentioned in dispatches for his services there.

He served in World War II initially as a brigade major and latterly as Commander of the 71st Indian Infantry Brigade. He was awarded the Distinguished Service Order (DSO) for services in Arakan in 1944 and a Bar to his DSO for an assault landing at Ramree Island, located off the coast of Arakan, in 1945.

In 1948 he became Deputy Director of Infantry at the War Office and in 1950 he was made Chief of Staff at Malaya Command. He returned the War Office as Director of Military Training in 1953 and became Commandant of the British Sector in Berlin in 1955. He joined the Regular Commissions Board in 1957 and retired in 1959.

Military offices
Preceded by Sir William Oliver	Commandant, British Sector in Berlin; 1955–1956	Succeeded by Francis Rome
