= 36th Indian Infantry Brigade =

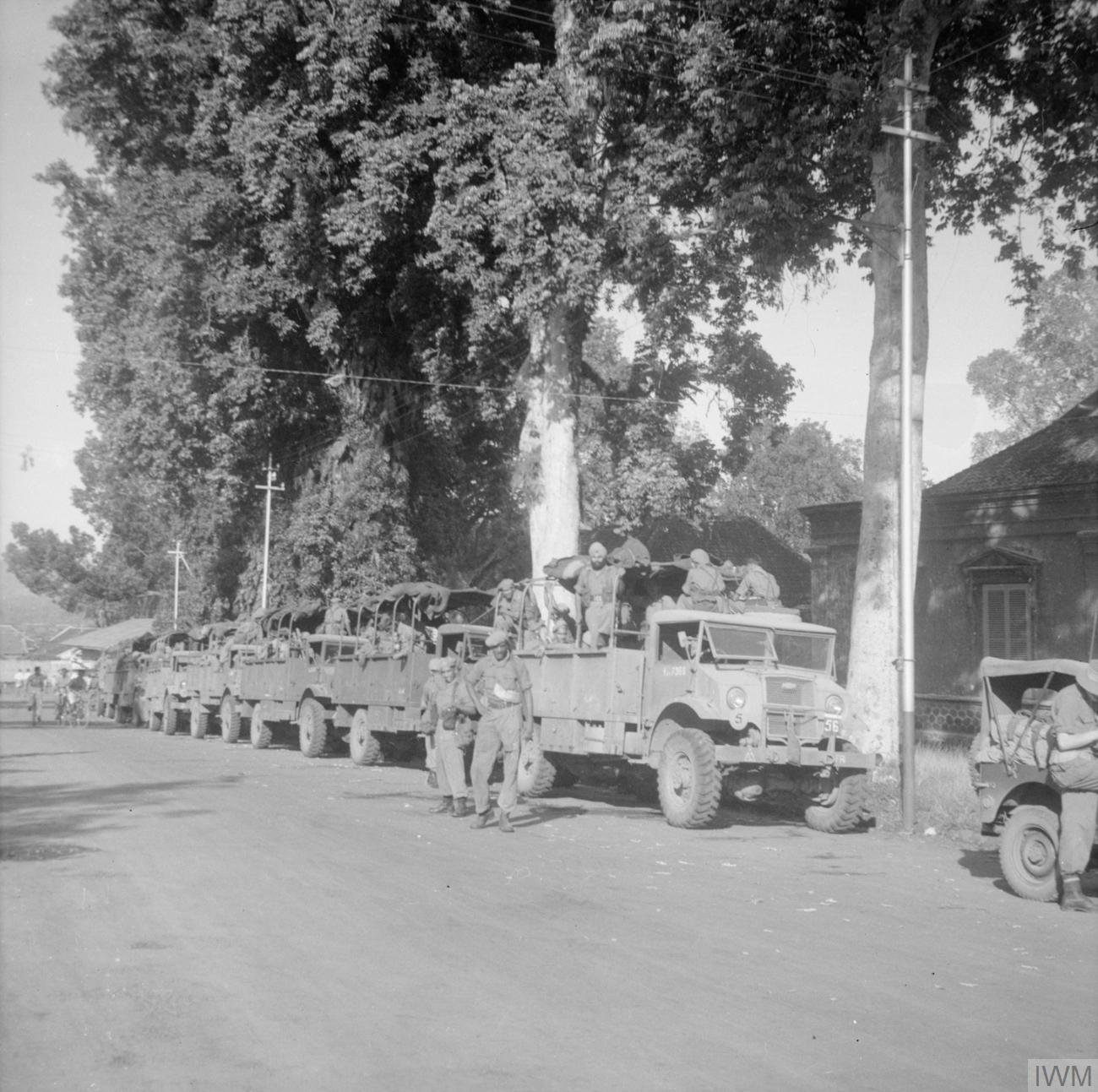
- Troops of the 36th Indian Brigade prepare to move off by lorry from Buitenzorg at the start of an operation to clear the northern road between Batavia and Bandoeng of Indonesian nationalist snipers and ambush squads.
- Active: 1941–1945
- Country: British India
- Allegiance: British Empire
- Branch: British Indian Army
- Type: Infantry
- Size: Brigade
- Engagements: Burma Campaign

Commanders
- Notable commanders: Brigadier Lechmere Thomas

The 36th Indian Infantry Brigade was an infantry brigade formation of the Indian Army during World War II. It was formed in June 1941, at Baleli in India and assigned to the 14th Indian Infantry Division. The brigade spent between March 1942 and April 1943, with the Eastern Army. It was then assigned to the 26th Indian Infantry Division until the end of the war. It also acted as corps reserves in February 1944 for the XV Indian Corps.

== Formation ==
- 8th Battalion, 13th Frontier Force Rifles June 1941 to July 1944 and October 1944 to August 1945
- 5th Battalion, 16th Punjab Regiment July 1941 to November 1944
- 7th Battalion, 5th Mahratta Light Infantry August 1941 to May 1942
- 6th Medium Regiment, Royal Artillery May to September 1942
- 1st Battalion, North Staffordshire Regiment October 1942 to September 1943
- 9th Battalion, 15th Punjab Regiment May 1944
- 1st Battalion, 8th Gurkha Rifles November 1943 to August 1945
- 2nd Battalion, Ajmer Regiment November 1944 to April 1945
- 5th Battalion, 9th Jat Regiment December 1944 to August 1945

== See also ==
- List of Indian Army Brigades in World War II
