= Arakan campaign (1942–1943) =

Military campaign in Arakan during World War II

- Part of the Burma campaign of World War II
Date	17 December 1942 – Early June 1943
Location	Arakan, western Burma
Result	Japanese victory

Belligerents
United Kingdom: India	Empire of Japan

Commanders and leaders
Noel Irwin; William Slim	(Empire of Japan) Kosuke Miyawaki (Empire of Japan) Takeshi Koga

Strength
4 brigades rising to 9 brigades 5 motor launches 72 landing craft 3 paddle steamers	1 regiment rising to 1 division

Casualties and losses
916 killed 4,141 wounded and missing	611 killed 1,165 wounded (estimated)

The Arakan campaign of 1942–1943 was the first tentative Allied attack into Burma, following the Japanese invasion of Burma earlier in 1942, during the Second World War. The British Army and British Indian Army were not ready for offensive actions in the difficult terrain they encountered, nor had the civil government, industry and transport infrastructure of Eastern India been organised to support the Army on the frontier with Burma. Japanese defenders occupying well-prepared positions repeatedly repulsed the British and Indian forces, who were then forced to retreat when the Japanese received reinforcements and counter-attacked.

== Prelude ==
=== Situation in 1942 ===
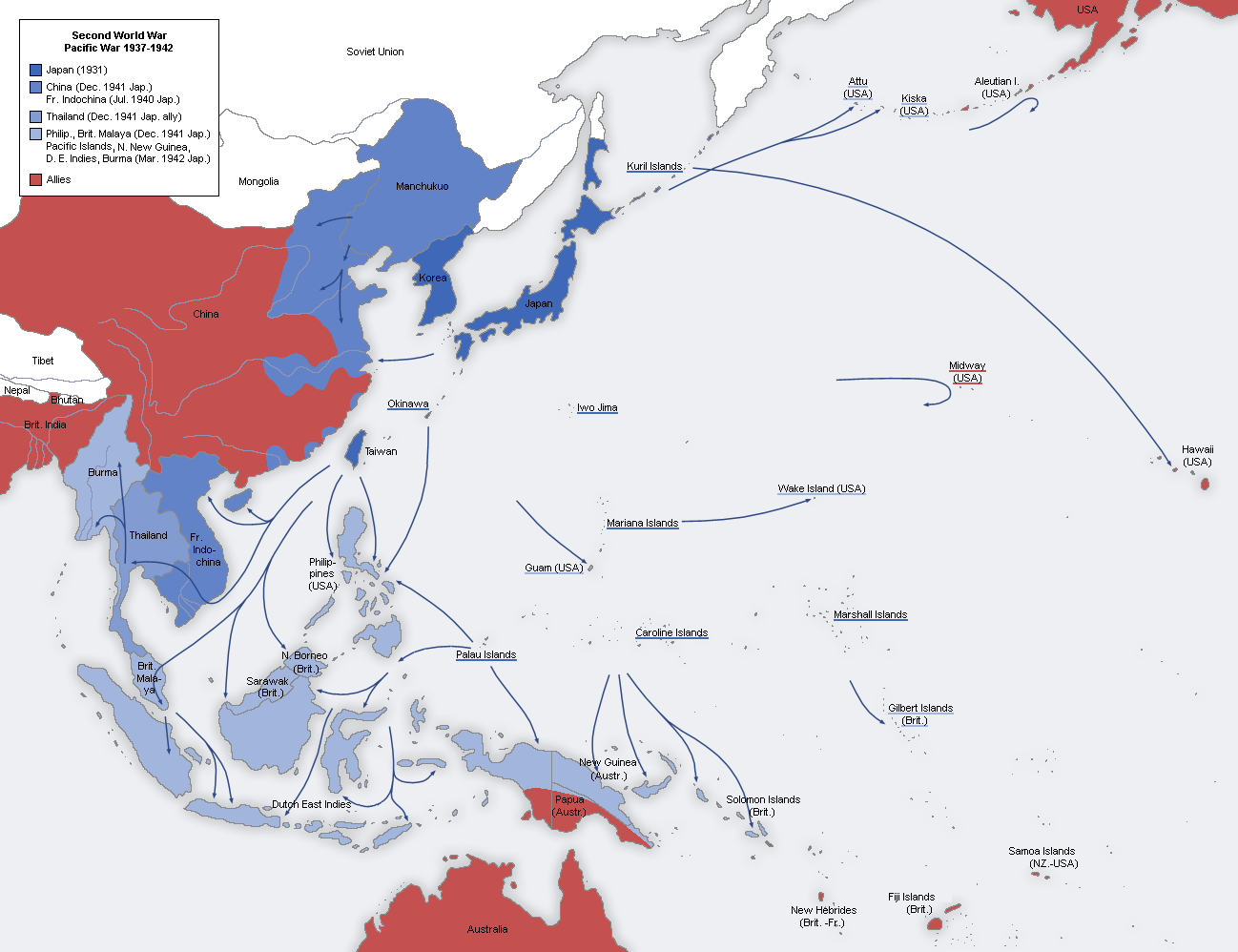
Japanese advance until mid-1942

In May 1942, the Allies retreated from Burma, accompanied by many refugees, mainly Indian and Anglo-Burmese. Although the Japanese halted their advance on the Chindwin River (mainly because the heavy monsoon rains descended at this point and made the roads and tracks through the mountainous frontier between India and Burma impassable), the leadership of the British Indian Army feared that they would attack again after the monsoon ended. The Government of India and the state governments of the eastern provinces of Bengal, Bihar and Orissa faced widespread disorder and a growing famine which would eventually become the disastrous Bengal famine of 1943.

The British reorganised their command in eastern India. The headquarters of Eastern Army, under Lieutenant General Charles Broad, were at Ranchi in Bihar. This army command was originally a peacetime administrative headquarters for depots and units stationed in Eastern India. It unexpectedly found itself in control of a very large rear communications area, and the troops on the frontier with Burma, roles for which it had not prepared in peacetime. Its fighting formations were the IV Corps, commanded by Lieutenant General Noel Irwin, at Imphal in Manipur, and the newly formed XV Corps, commanded from 9 June 1942 by Lieutenant General William Slim, with its headquarters at Barrackpore, near Calcutta.

XV Corps in turn commanded 14th Indian (Light) Division which was stationed around Chittagong and faced the Burmese coastal province of Arakan, and the 26th Indian Infantry Division in the Ganges Delta. The 14th (Light) Division had been raised at Quetta in Baluchistan and was originally intended to form part of the Allied forces in Iraq and Persia. It was fully formed and equipped but lacked training, particularly in jungle warfare. The 26th Division was still forming, and was engaged in training and in internal security duties.

=== Allied plans ===
General Archibald Wavell, the Commander in Chief in India, was making plans to mount offensives into Burma even as Allied troops were retreating into India. On most parts of the front, roads and other lines of communications had to be improved or built from scratch before attacks could be considered, a task which would take at least a year, but on the Arakan front, distances were comparatively short and the necessary communications could theoretically be completed by the time the monsoon ended. In fact, the time required to improve the poor roads in the region delayed the start of the offensive until mid-December 1942.

In July, General Broad retired and Lieutenant General Irwin was appointed to command Eastern Army. He informed Lieutenant General Slim that the headquarters of Eastern Army and XV Corps were to exchange places for the offensive. Eastern Army HQ would move to Barrackpur and take direct command of the Arakan offensive, while XV Corps HQ moved to Ranchi to restore order in Bihar, and raise and train fresh divisions for later combat in Burma.

The limited goal of the British advance in Arakan in 1942 and 1943 was Akyab Island. This held a port and all-weather airfield, which were prominent in Allied plans to recover Burma. Fighters and transport aircraft, operating at a radius of 250 miles (400 km) from Akyab, could cover most of Central Burma, and medium bombers operating from Akyab could range as far as Rangoon, the capital of Burma, 330 miles (530 km) distant. The island lay at the end of the Mayu Peninsula. This was marked by a narrow but precipitous and jungle-covered range of hills, the Mayu Range, which separated the narrow coastal plain from the fertile rice-growing valley of the Kalapanzin River, which became the Mayu River below the town of Buthidaung. The only permanently established route across the range was a disused railway track, converted into a road, which linked Buthidaung with the port of Maungdaw on the west coast of the peninsula.

Wavell's plan to capture Akyab,Operation Cannibal, was originally planned in September 1942 that Akyab would be taken by an amphibious assault launched by the British 29th Brigade, while the 14th Indian Division mounted a subsidiary advance down the Mayu peninsula. The amphibious part of the plan was dropped because 29th Brigade (which until November 1942 was engaged in the Battle of Madagascar) and the landing craft could not be made available in time. Instead, it was planned that once 14th Division had reached Foul Point at the extreme southern end of the Mayu peninsula, it would improvise an attack by the 6th Brigade across the narrow channel which separated Akyab Island from the peninsula. (By late December, five motor launches, 72 landing craft and three paddle steamers were available.)

== Battle ==
=== Advance begins ===
The 14th Indian Division, commanded by Major General Wilfrid Lewis Lloyd, began advancing south from Cox's Bazar near the frontier between India and Burma, on 17 December 1942. The Japanese defending the Arakan front were "Miyawaki Force". This consisted of two battalions of the 213th Regiment (part of the Japanese 33rd Division), a mountain artillery battalion and various supporting arms detachments, commanded by Colonel Kosuke Miyawaki. Although the forward unit (the second battalion of the 213th Regiment, known as "Isagoda battalion" after its commander) had spent fifty days digging defensive positions to cover the Maungdaw-Buthidaung road, they were ordered to pull back to join the main body of the force near the tip of the Mayu peninsula. Lloyd's division captured the road on 22 December.

=== Advance stalls ===
At this point, Miyawaki was informed that another division, the Japanese 55th Division, less a regiment which was serving in western New Guinea, had been dispatched from Central Burma to Arakan. The division's commander was Lieutenant General Takeshi Koga. Miyawaki was ordered to move forward to Donbaik on the Mayu peninsula and Rathedaung on the east bank of the Mayu River, to secure positions from which this division could operate. On 28 December, the "Isagoda Battalion" occupied Rathedaung and forestalled the attempt by the 123rd Indian Infantry Brigade to capture the town. On 9–10 January, renewed attacks on Rathedaung were thrown back.

While most of Miyawaki's remaining troops occupied Akyab, a single Japanese company occupied the narrow front between the sea and the foothills of the Mayu Range 1 mile (1.6 km) north of Donbaik, protected by a chaung (a tidal creek) with steep banks 9 feet (2.7 m) high. They constructed well-concealed and mutually supporting bunkers of timber and earth. Between 7 and 9 January 1943, the 47th Indian Infantry Brigade attacked this line but were repulsed. The bunkers could not be penetrated by field artillery, and if British or Indian infantry reached the bunkers, the defenders could call down artillery and mortar fire on their own position.

Wavell and Irwin visited Lloyd on 10 January. Lloyd asked for tanks to deal with the bunkers. Irwin in turn demanded a single troop of tanks from 50th Indian Tank Brigade, part of Slim's XV Corps at Ranchi. Both Slim and the brigade commander (Brigadier George Todd) protested that a complete regiment (of 50 or more tanks) would be required, but they were overruled. On 1 February, 55th Indian Infantry Brigade, supported by only eight Valentine tanks, attacked the Donbaik position. Some of the tanks became stuck in ditches, while others were knocked out by Japanese shellfire; the brigade's attack subsequently failed. A renewed attack by the Indian 123rd Brigade on Rathedaung two days later briefly gained some outlying positions, but the Brigade was forced to withdraw.

The third battalion of the Japanese 213th Regiment had been sent to Arakan from Pakokku in Central Burma, where it had been in reserve, ahead of the 55th Division. During February, it cleared detachments of the British irregular V Force from the valley of the Kaladan River, where they had been threatening the Japanese lines of communication. V Force warned the British of the large numbers of Japanese approaching the battlefield.

=== Last British attacks ===
Following their defeats at Donbaik, the Indian 47th and 55th Brigades had been moved east of the Mayu Range. In the first week of March, the third battalion of the Japanese 213th Regiment crossed the Mayu River and attacked Indian 55th Brigade, forcing it to retreat. This left the Indian 47th Brigade isolated north of Rathedaung. In spite of this growing threat to the left flank of 14th Division, General Irwin demanded that another attack be made on the Donbaik position, using the powerful and well-trained British 6th Brigade. On 10 March, Lieutenant General Slim had been ordered to report on the situation in Arakan, although it was not yet intended that XV Corps headquarters take charge of the front. Slim reported to Irwin that with so many brigades to command, 14th Indian Division was unable to control the front. Morale was low in some units, reflected in unnecessary panics. However, Irwin made no changes at this point.

For the next assault on Donbaik, Lloyd planned to use the 71st Indian Brigade in a flanking move along the spine of the Mayu Range, but by this time, Irwin had lost confidence in Lloyd and his brigadiers, and laid down the plan of attack himself. He diverted the 71st Brigade to the Mayu Valley and ordered the British 6th Brigade, reinforced to a strength of six battalions, to make an attack on a narrow front. The brigade attacked on 18 March. Some of the Japanese 55th Division had reinforced the defenders of Donbaik, and in spite of heavy artillery support the 6th Brigade also was unable to deal with the bunkers and suffered 300 casualties. After this repulse, Wavell and Irwin ordered the ground already taken to be held.

=== Japanese counter-attack ===
On 25 March, Lloyd ordered the isolated 47th Indian Brigade to fall back across the Mayu Range, despite Irwin's instructions to hold all ground until the monsoon. Irwin rescinded Lloyd's order and dismissed Lloyd on 29 March, taking command of the 14th Division in person until the headquarters of the Indian 26th Division, commanded by Major-General Cyril Lomax, could take over.

On 3 April, while "Uno Force" (the Japanese 143rd Regiment) pressed northwards up the Mayu River valley, the main body of the Japanese 55th Division ("Tanahashi Force", consisting mainly of the 112th Regiment) crossed the Mayu Range at a point where British officers had regarded the range as impassable and cut the coastal track behind the leading British troops. They attacked on the night of 5 April and captured the village of Indin, where they also overran the headquarters of the British 6th Brigade and captured its commander, Brigadier Ronald Cavendish, his adjutant and six staff officers. Cavendish, some of his staff and some of their Japanese captors were killed shortly afterwards, probably by British artillery fire. (Cavendish had directed the British guns to open fire on Indin just before being overrun.) The 47th Indian Brigade was forced to retreat across the Mayu Range in small parties, abandoning all its equipment and ceasing to exist as a fighting force.

Indian XV Corps headquarters under Lieutenant General Slim belatedly took charge of the Arakan front. Although the British 6th Brigade was still formidable in spite of its recent defeats, Slim was concerned that the other troops on the front were tired and demoralised. Nevertheless, he and Lomax anticipated that the Japanese would next try to capture the Maungdaw-Buthidaung road and planned to surround and destroy them. While the British 6th Brigade defended the coastal plain, eight British and Indian battalions were deployed to encircle the Japanese as they neared the road at a point where two tunnels carried it through the Mayu range.

In late April, the Japanese attacked northwards, as Slim and Lomax had predicted. They met stiff resistance on the flanks and advanced instead in the centre. On 4 May as Slim prepared to order two Indian battalions to surround the Japanese, a British battalion defending a hill referred to as Point 551 gave way, allowing the Japanese to cut the Maungdaw-Buthidaung road. Counter-attacks failed and the British and Indian troops in Buthidaung and the Kalapanzin valley were cut off. As there was no other route for motor vehicles across the Mayu Range, they were forced to destroy their transport before retreating north up the valley.

Irwin ordered Maungdaw at least to be held but Slim and Lomax decided that the port was not prepared for a siege and that Japanese artillery could dominate the Naf River on which the port stood, preventing reinforcements and supplies reaching it. They also feared that the exhausted troops which 26th Indian Division had inherited could not be relied upon to defend the port resolutely. On 11 May, the port was abandoned and XV Corps fell back to Cox's Bazar in India, where the open rice-growing country gave the advantage to British artillery. The British stand had also bought enough time for the monsoon rains to arrive in force (Arakan receives 200 in (5,100 mm) per annum), dissuading the Japanese from following up their successes.

== Aftermath of the campaign ==
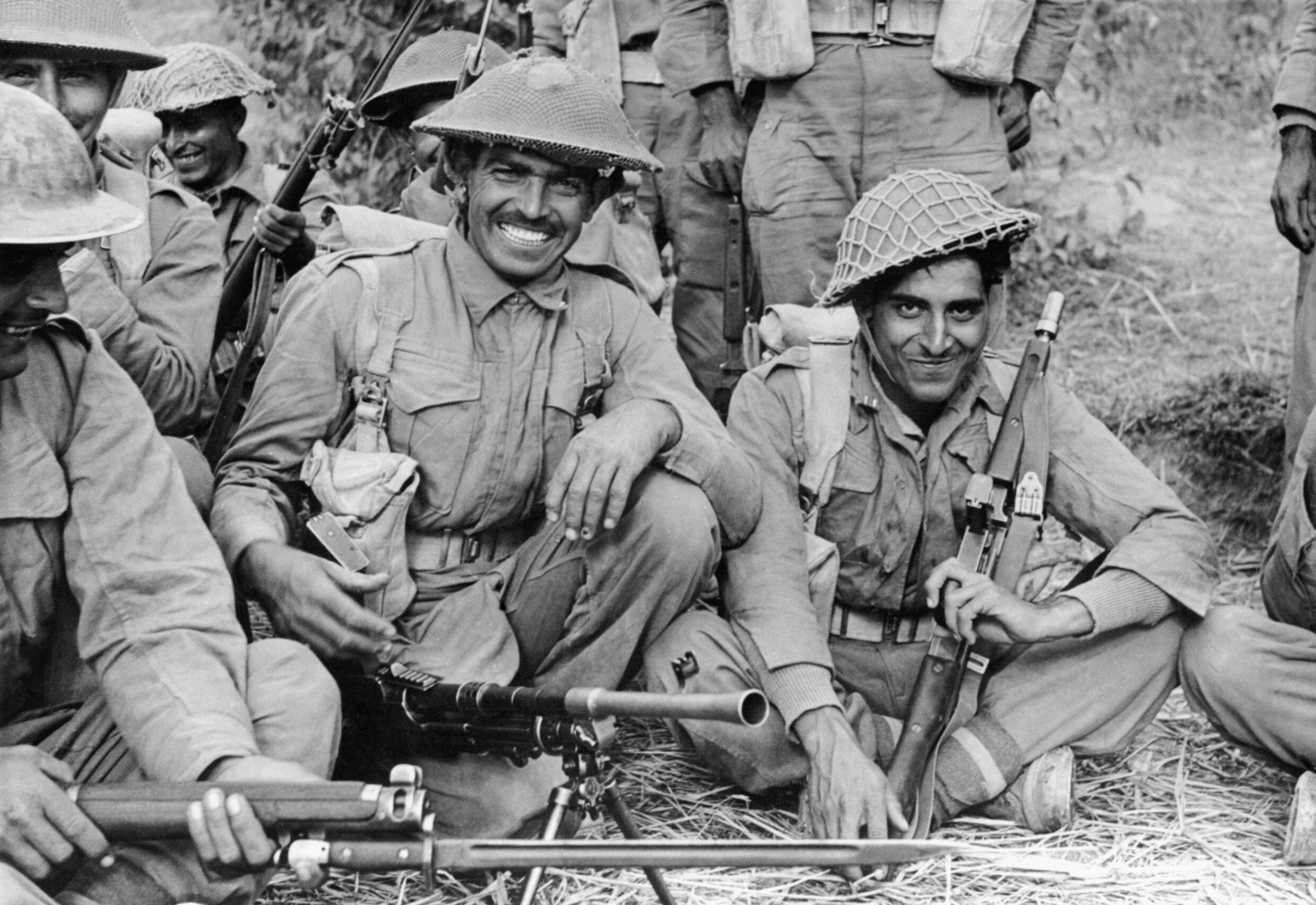
An Indian infantry section of the 2nd Battalion, 7th Rajput Regiment about to go on patrol on the Arakan front, 1944

Irwin, Slim and other officers were frank about the chief cause of failure in the Arakan. The average British and Indian soldier was not properly trained for fighting in jungle, which together with repeated defeats adversely affected morale. This was exacerbated by poor administration in the rear areas in India. Drafts of reinforcements sent to replace casualties were found in some cases to have not even completed basic training. There were several contributing factors. At one point, 14th Indian Division HQ was controlling no less than nine infantry brigades (instead of the usual three) and a large line of communications area. It was not equipped to handle this enormous responsibility. The road used as supply routes were inadequate, and there were insufficient landing craft and small ships as an alternative.

Lieutenant General Irwin attempted to dismiss Slim from command of XV Corps, but was himself relieved of command of Eastern Army, and returned to Britain on sick leave. His replacement at Eastern Army was General George Giffard, a very different character from the abrasive Irwin. Giffard concentrated on restoring the Army's morale and improving its state of health and training.

As part of a general shuffle of the senior appointments in the Allied, British and Indian armies about this time, Wavell became Viceroy of India and General Claude Auchinleck became Commander in Chief in India. The Indian Army establishment was reorganised to concentrate on fighting the Burma campaign, with success in the following two years.

== Chindits ==
In late 1942 and early 1943, unorthodox commander Brigadier Orde Wingate had created a long range penetration force which he named the Chindits, a corruption of the Burmese word "Chinthe", the lion which guarded Buddhist temples. He intended to mount a raid into Central Burma in conjunction with an offensive from Yunnan by Chiang Kai-shek's Y Force. Chiang had refused to commit his armies, but Wingate, and Wavell, launched the raid anyway rather than waste the force's training.

The force, split into several columns, penetrated the Japanese front along the Chindwin River and marched east to carry out demolitions on the railway between Mandalay and Myitkkyina. When they attempted to cross the Irrawaddy River however, they met with unsuitable terrain and heavy opposition.They were forced to make their way back to India, often split into small parties.

They lost 1,000 men out of 3,000, mainly to exhaustion and lack of supplies. Despite these heavy casualties, their exploits were widely publicised, to prove that British and Indian soldiers could be as effective in the jungle as the Japanese. This did much to offset the depressing effects on morale of the Arakan fighting.
