= Alfred Cyril Curtis =

British Army general (1894–1971)

- Born: 2 November 1894
- Died: 13 October 1971 (aged 76)
- Military career
- Allegiance: United Kingdom
- Branch: British Indian Army
- Service years: 1914–1948
- Rank: Major General
- Commands: 14th Indian Infantry Division
- Conflicts: World War I World War II
- Awards: Order of the Bath; Distinguished Service Order; Military Cross

Major General Alfred Cyril Curtis CB DSO MC (2 November 1894 – 13 October 1971) was a senior British Indian Army officer who commanded the 14th Indian Infantry Division during the Second World War.

== Biography ==
Born on 2 November 1894 and educated at Bedford School, Curtis entered the Royal Military College, Sandhurst and was commissioned as a second lieutenant into the 11th Sikh Regiment of the British Indian Army in 1915, serving in France, Belgium and Mesopotamia during the First World War, and ending the war as a captain. Between the wars he attended the Staff College, Camberley from 1927 to 1928 and, during the Second World War he served in Burma. He commanded the 14th Indian Infantry Division and was appointed as Aide-de-camp to King George VI in 1944.

Major General Alfred Curtis retired in 1948 and died in Jersey on 13 October 1971.
