= 23rd Indian Infantry Brigade =

23rd Indian Infantry Brigade 123rd Indian Infantry Brigade
- Active: 1941–1947
- Country: (British Raj) British India
- Allegiance: British Empire
- Branch: British Indian Army
- Type: Infantry
- Size: Brigade
- Engagements: Burma Campaign; Punjab Boundary Force

Commanders
- Notable commanders: 23rd Brigade; A V Hammond; 123rd Brigade; T J W Winterton; G C Evans; E J Denholm-Young

The 23rd Indian Infantry Brigade was an infantry brigade formation of the Indian Army during World War II from 1941 to at least 1947. The brigade was formed in February 1941, at Loralai in India and in June 1941, assigned to the 14th Indian Infantry Division. In March 1942, the brigade was reassigned to the 23rd Indian Infantry Division, just before being renumbered 123rd Indian Infantry Brigade. As the 123rd the brigade served in the Burma Campaign with not only the 23rd but with the 14th again and the 5th Indian Infantry Division.

As 123rd Indian Brigade, the brigade served with the Punjab Boundary Force during the Partition of India in 1947.

== Formation ==
=== 23rd Indian Infantry Brigade ===
- 1st Battalion, 15th Punjab Regiment
- 8th Battalion, 10th Baluch Regiment
- 4th Battalion, 5th Mahratta Light Infantry

=== 123rd Indian Infantry Brigade ===
- 1st Battalion, 15th Punjab Regiment to April 1943
- 8th Battalion, 10th Baluch Regiment to December 1942 and March to April 1943
- 4th Battalion, 5th Mahratta Light Infantry to June 1942
- 10th Battalion, Lancashire Fusiliers July 1942 to April 1943
- 1st Battalion, 17th Dogra Regiment October 1942 to January 1943 and December 1943 to August 1945
- 8th Battalion, 6th Rajputana Rifles January to March 1943 and May to June 1943
- 2nd Battalion, 1st Punjab Regiment July 1943 to April 1944 and September 1944 to August 1945
- 2nd Battalion, Suffolk Regiment July 1943 to September 1944
- 1st Battalion, 18th Royal Garhwal Rifles February 1944
- 3rd Battalion, 2nd Punjab Regiment April 1944 to March 1945
- 7th Battalion, York and Lancaster Regiment March to June 1945
- 3rd Battalion, 9th Jat Regiment April to May 1945
- 3rd Battalion, 9th Gurkha Rifles July to August 1945

== See also ==
- List of Indian Army Brigades in World War II
