= Arthur L. Hammond =

American biblical scholar

Arthur L. Hammond (August 13, 1896 – July 21, 1979), an American citizen, was the first evangelical missionary in Cambodia. He trained at Nyack College and first arrived in Southeast Asia as a Christian & Missionary Alliance (CMA) missionary in 1921 and served for two years in Saigon, Vietnam. Entering Cambodia in January 1923 with his new wife Esther, he began translation of the Bible into Khmer in 1925. The New Testament was completed by 1934, but it was not until 1954 that the whole Bible (KOV) was finally published.
