= Arthur George Hammond =

Recipient of the Victoria Cross

Sir Arthur George Hammond VC KCB DSO
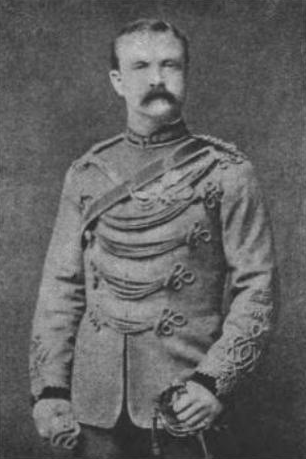
- Born: 28 September 1843; Dawlish, Devon, England
- Died: 20 April 1919 (aged 75); Camberley, Surrey, England
- Burial place: St Michael's Churchyard, Camberley
- Military career
- Allegiance: United Kingdom
- Branch: British Army; British Indian Army
- Rank: Brigadier General
- Units: 82nd Regiment of Foot; Bengal Staff Corps
- Conflicts: Second Anglo-Afghan War; Hazara Expedition of 1888; Chitral Expedition; Tirah Campaign
- Awards: Victoria Cross; Order of the Bath; Distinguished Service Order

Colonel Sir Arthur George Hammond VC KCB DSO (28 September 1843 – 20 April 1919) was an English recipient of the Victoria Cross, the highest and most prestigious award for gallantry in the face of the enemy that can be awarded to British and Commonwealth forces.

== Early life and career ==
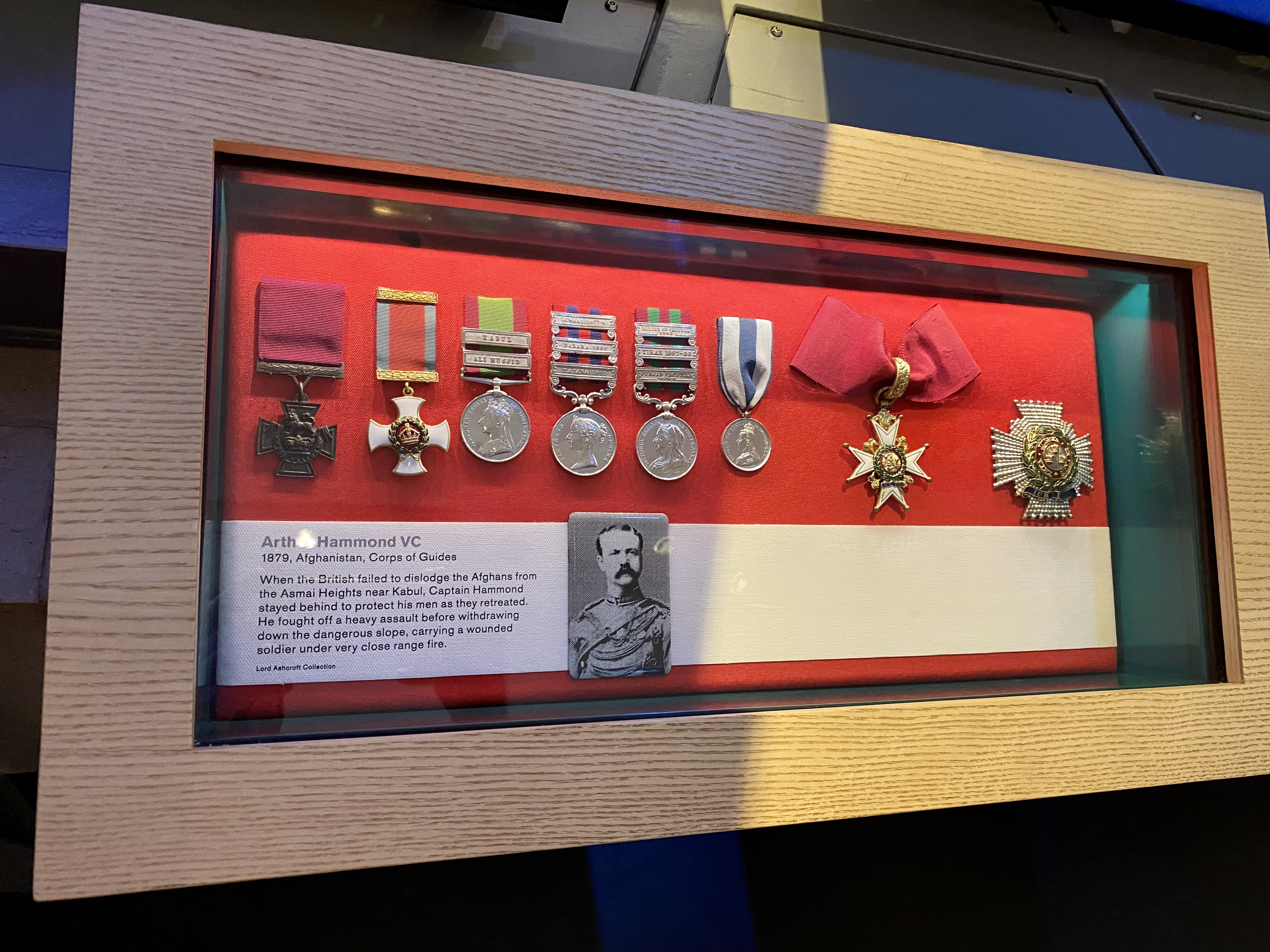
Hammond's medals on display at the Imperial War Museum, London

Arthur Hammond was born in Dawlish, Devon on 23 September 1843, the fifth son of Major T.G. Hammond, Abbey Grange, Sherborne, Dorset. Arthur attended Sherborne School as a day boy from 1852 to 1860. After leaving Sherborne he attended Addiscombe Military Seminary and in 1861 entered the Indian Staff Corps. After serving in the 82nd Regiment of Foot (Prince of Wales's Volunteer Regiment) he joined the Bengal Staff Corps and Queen Victoria's Own Corps of Guides. He served in the Jowaki Afridi Expedition with the Guides in 1877 (mentioned in Despatches), and the Afghan War 1878–80 at Ali Musjid, Tahkt-i-Shan and Asmai Heights and Kabul.

== VC action ==
Hammond was 36 years old, and a captain in the Bengal Staff Corps, British Indian Army during the Second Anglo-Afghan War when the following deed took place on 14 December 1879 at the action on the Asmai Heights, near Kabul, Afghanistan, for which he was awarded the VC:

For conspicuous coolness and gallantry at the action on the Asmai Heights, near Kabul, on the 14th December, 1879, in defending the top of the hill with a rifle and fixed bayonet, against large numbers of the enemy, while the 72nd Highlanders and Guides were retiring; and again, on the retreat down the hill, in stopping to assist in carrying away a wounded Sepoy, the enemy being not sixty yards off, firing heavily all the time.

== Subsequent career and death ==
In addition to the Afghan War, he served in the Jowaki Campaign of 1877-1878 and also in the Hazara Campaigns of 1888 and 1891 (CB and Mention), commanded BDe in the Isazai Expedition 1892, Chitral Relief Force 1895 (Mention and thanks of Indian Government), and the Tirah Campaign of 1897-1898 (Commanded Peshawar Column).

He became A.D.C. to Queen Victoria in 1890.

He was promoted to a Knight Commander of the Order of the Bath (KCB) in the 1903 Durbar Honours, and received the award from the king at Buckingham Palace on 18 February 1903.

Following his long military career, Arthur Hammond retired to Camberley in Surrey where he named his residence Sherborne House. He died in April 1919 and is buried in St. Michael's Churchyard, Camberley. He was the father of Arthur Verney Hammond.

His obituary appeared in The Shirburnian, June 1919:

COL.SIR ARTHUR G .HAMMOND, V.C., K.C.B. There is to be recorded in our present issue the death of a distinguished Old Shirburnian, who, with his brothers (there were seven in all who owned allegiance to the School) gained their entire school training at Sherborne - Col. Sir Arthur G. Hammond, V.C., K.C.B., the fifth son of Major T. Hammond, H.E.LC.S., who lived at the Abbey Grange, Sherborne. Sir Arthur was born on September23rd, 1843, and entered the School in August, 1852, leaving it in 1860 to go to Addiscombe Military College; whilst in that year he had played in the Cricket Eleven for the School. In September, 1861, he entered the old Indian Staff Corps, being appointed Ensign in the Bengal Infantry, but was soon transferred to the Queen's Own Corps of Guides, with which distinguished Regiment he was connected during the greater Portion of his military career, and of which he became Commandant. Sir Arthur was in 1890 appointed A.D.C. to Queen Victoria, and being shortly afterwards Colonel on the Staff, had command of a Station. A short record of his war services may be given. In the Jowaki Afridea Expedition of 1877-78 he received the Medal with clasp, and was mentioned in despatches. For the Afghan War, 1878-80 (Ali Musjid, Takht-i-Shan, Asmai, Kabul, and Charaziah) he was twice mentioned in despatches and received the Afghan Medal with two clasps, while at the Asmai Heights he won the Victoria Cross on 14 December 1879, 'For conspicuous coolness and gallantry, in defending the top of the hill with a rifle and fixed bayonet against large numbers of the enemy, while the 72ndHighlandersand Guides were retiring; and again on the retreat down the hill, in stopping to assist in carrying away a wounded Sepoy, the enemy being not fifty yards off, firing heavily all the time.' In the Hazarai Expedition of 1888 (in command of the 3rd Sikhs) he was mentioned in despatches, awarded a clasp, and made D.S.O.: commanded a Brigade in the Expedition of 1891(Hazarai), was again mentioned in despatches, received another clasp, and made C.B. The Isazai Expedition of 1892 followed, with the Relief Force Operations in Chitral of 1895, where he had charge of the Lines of Communications and afterwards of a Brigade (despatches, medal and clasp, and the thanks of the Government), and, lastly, the Tirah Campaign, 1897–98, where he commanded the Peshawar Column, receiving another mention in Despatches with the two clasps. Sir Arthur Hammond resided for several years at Sherborne House, Camberley, Surrey, where he took a great interest in local matters, but his health was failing him for some little time, and he died on Easter Sunday, having never completely recovered from a severe operation which he had to undergo. In him the OS Society has lost one of its Vice-Presidents.

His VC is in private hands.
