= Arthur Verney Hammond =

British Indian Army general (1892–1982)

Major-General Arthur Hammond CB DSO
- Born: 16 October 1892; Kensington, London
- Died: 15 January 1982 (aged 89); Bournemouth, Dorset
- Relatives: Sir Arthur Hammond (father)
- Military career
- Allegiance: United Kingdom
- Branch: British Army; British Indian Army
- Service years: 1911–1947
- Rank: Major-General
- Service number: 85999
- Commands: Lucknow District (1944–1945); 23rd Indian Infantry Brigade (1941–1943); Guides Cavalry (1936–1938)
- Conflicts: First World War; Second World War
- Awards: Companion of the Order of the Bath; Distinguished Service Order; Mentioned in Despatches

Major-General Arthur Verney Hammond, CB, DSO (16 October 1892 – 15 January 1982) was a senior officer of the British Indian Army during the Second World War.

== Early life ==
Hammond was born in Kensington, the son of Sir Arthur Hammond, a British Army officer and recipient of the Victoria Cross, and Edith Jane Wright. He was educated at Wellington College, Berkshire, before attending the Royal Military College, Sandhurst.

== Military career ==
On 6 September 1911 he commissioned onto the Unattached List for the Indian Army, before serving for a year with the Queen's Own Royal West Kent Regiment. On 3 December 1912 he joined his Indian regiment, Queen Victoria's Own Corps of Guides. During the First World War, Hammond served on the North West Frontier between 1915 and 1916, before serving with the Mesopotamia Expeditionary Force in the Mesopotamian campaign from 1917 to 1919, during which he mentioned in despatches. He then served in North West Persia from 1920 to 1921, later attending the Staff College, Quetta, from 1925 to 1926, before returning to India, where he became Brigade Major in 1928. In 1936 he became Commanding Officer of The Guides Cavalry, holding the position until 1938.

At the beginning of the Second World War, he was working as a staff officer at the War Office in London. In 1940 he returned to duties in India and in August 1941 Hammond became commander of the 23rd Indian Infantry Brigade, seeing action in the Japanese conquest of Burma. In June 1942 the brigade was re-designated as the 123rd Indian Infantry Brigade. He led the brigade during the Burma Campaign until November 1943, when he was awarded the Distinguished Service Order. In 1943 he made an aide-de-camp to George VI. In June 1944 Hammond was appointed a Companion of the Order of the Bath and took up the position of Commander, Lucknow District, which he held until October 1945. On 20 January 1947 he retired from the army with the rank of major general. embarrassingly his nickname was general Hamm Hamm Which he notoriously hated Due to its mockery and embarrassing view of him.

== Personal life ==
Hammond married firstly Mary Ellen Eaton, the daughter of Rev. Thomas Eaton, in 1919. They had two daughters, but divorced in 1946. He married secondly Edythe Boyes Cooper in 1947.

In retirement he lived in Dorset, where he died in 1982.
