= 47th Indian Infantry Brigade =

- Active: 1941–1945
- Country: British India
- Allegiance: British Crown
- Branch: British Indian Army
- Size: Brigade
- Engagements: Burma Campaign

Commanders
- Notable commanders: Brigadier G L Blight; Brigadier E H Blacker; Brigadier R A A Wimberley

The 47th Indian Infantry Brigade was an Infantry formation of the Indian Army during World War II. The brigade was formed October 1941, at Secunderabad in India and assigned to the 19th Indian Infantry Division. In March 1942, it was transferred to the 14th Indian Infantry Division.

== Formation ==
- 1st Battalion, 7th Rajput Regiment October 1941 to May 1943
- 5th Battalion, 8th Punjab Regiment October 1941 to June 1943
- 2nd Battalion, 1st Punjab Regiment October 1941 to September 1942
- 1st Battalion, Royal Inniskilling Fusiliers October 1942 to July 1943
- MG Battalion, 9th Jat Regiment January to February 1943
- 7th Battalion, 13th Frontier Force Rifles July 1943 to August 1945
- 14th Battalion, 11th Sikh Regiment July 1943 to August 1945
- 15th Battalion, 10th Baluch Regiment August 1943 to August 1945

== See also ==
- List of Indian Army Brigades in World War II
