= 14th Indian Infantry Division =

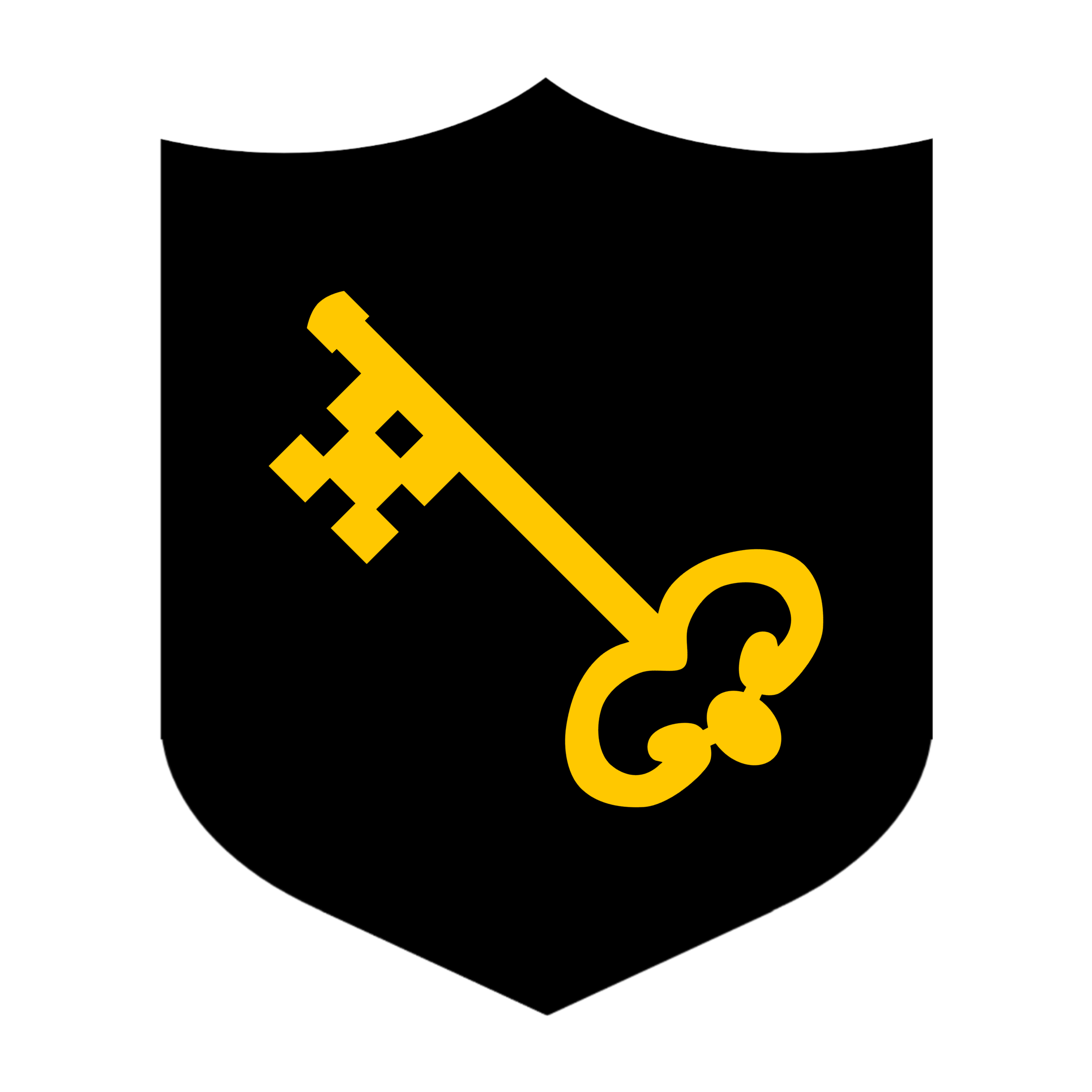
- The Division formation sign.
- Active: 1941–1945
- Country: (British Raj) British India
- Allegiance: British Empire
- Branch: British Indian Army
- Type: Infantry/Training
- Size: Division
- Nickname: Quetta Division
- Engagements: Burma Campaign

Commanders
- Notable commanders: Wilfrid Lewis Lloyd; Noel Irwin

The 14th Indian Infantry Division was an infantry division of the Indian Army during World War II. It fought in the Arakan Campaign 1942–43, and was subsequently converted into a Training Division, providing drafts of replacements for units of the Fourteenth Army during the Burma Campaign.

== History as 14th Indian Division ==
=== Formation and early actions ===
The division was raised on 1 June 1941, at Quetta in Baluchistan. Its badge was a depiction in black and white of the ranges of mountains above Quetta, surrounded by a stylised letter "Q" in white on a black background. The division had temporary commanders while forming. On 15 October 1941, Major General Wilfrid Lewis Lloyd, who had a distinguished record as commander of a brigade in the Western Desert, was appointed commander.

When first formed, the division was intended to operate in Iraq and Persia, then under Allied military occupation, and first trained for mountain and desert warfare. It consisted of the 23rd, 36th and 37th Indian Infantry brigades. In December, war with Imperial Japan broke out. In March, after the Japanese captured Rangoon, the capital of Burma, the division was reassigned to the eastern frontier of India, and its existing brigades were dispersed to other divisions being formed. The 47th and 49th Indian Infantry Brigades were assigned to the division in March 1942, although the 49th Brigade was removed in May. The 23rd Indian Brigade was renumbered the 123rd Indian Infantry Brigade and returned to the division in July.

In the aftermath of the Japanese conquest of Burma, the 14th Division was sent to garrison Chittagong, on the frontier with Burma. As part of the lessons learned by the British Indian Army in the retreat from Burma, the division's equipment was lightened and its establishment was reduced, to allow easier movement off roads and in difficult terrain. The divisional transport consisted of four jeep companies and six mule companies. The division was renamed 14th Indian (Light) Division to reflect these changes.

The light division's establishment included only two infantry brigades (instead of the usual three). However, in July 1942, the division also took over the 55th Indian Infantry Brigade as a third brigade, and also the 88th Indian Infantry Brigade for the static defence of Chittagong. The main body of the division held a line around Cox's Bazar, on the frontier with Burma.

=== First Arakan Campaign ===
In late 1942, the division began an advance in the Burmese coastal province of Arakan, intending ultimately to recapture Akyab Island, vital for its airfields. When well-constructed Japanese defences were encountered on the Mayu peninsula only a few miles from the island, extra brigades were added to the division. Eventually, the division HQ commanded no less than nine brigades and a large rear communications area, making effective administration and coordination impossible. A temporary headquarters, "Mayforce", was created to control operations in the Mayu River valley, separated from the main body of the division by a rugged hill range.

Frontal attacks on the Japanese positions failed with heavy losses. On 29 February 1943, Lieutenant General Noel Irwin, the commander of Eastern Army, dismissed Major General Lloyd and took personal command of the division. Japanese reinforcements attacked the division's exposed left flank, overrunning several units and forcing the remainder to make a disorderly withdrawal.

On 14 April 1943, the division HQ was withdrawn to Ranchi in Bihar to reform, being replaced by the headquarters of Indian 26th Infantry Division. Soon afterwards, on 8 May 1943, 88 Infantry Brigade was disbanded.

=== Order of Battle 14 April 1943 (on withdrawal from Arakan) ===
General Officer Commanding: General Noel Irwin

- 47th Indian Infantry Brigade
  - 1st Battalion, Royal Inniskilling Fusiliers
  - 1st Battalion, 7th Rajput Regiment
  - 5th Battalion, 8th Punjab Regiment
- 55th Indian Infantry Brigade
  - 2nd Battalion, 1st Punjab Regiment
  - 8th Battalion, 6th Rajputana Rifles
  - 1st Battalion, 15th Punjab Regiment
- 123rd Indian Infantry Brigade
  - 10th Battalion, Lancashire Fusiliers
  - 8th Battalion, 10th Baluch Regiment
- 88th Indian Infantry Brigade (Chittagong garrison)
  - 5th Battalion, 9th Jat Regiment
  - 1st Battalion, 16th Punjab Regiment
  - 14th Battalion, 12th Frontier Force Regiment

The British 6th Brigade, 4th Indian Infantry Brigade, 71st Indian Infantry Brigade, British 29th Brigade and British 72nd Brigade were attached from other divisions.

- Divisional Units
  - MG Battalion, 9th Jat Regiment (divisional machine-gun unit)
  - 130th (Lowland) Field Regiment, Royal Artillery
  - 44th Light Anti-Aircraft Regiment, Royal Artillery
  - 23rd Mountain Regiment, Royal Indian Artillery
  - 14th Indian Infantry Divisional Signals, Indian Signal Corps
  - 26th, 73rd, 74th Field Companies, Indian Engineers (IE)
  - 306th Field Park Company IE
  - 60th Indian Field Ambulance Indian Army Medical Corps (selected for airborne duties and moved to 44th Indian Airborne Division)

== History as 14th Indian Training division ==
It was recognised that a major factor in early Allied defeats in Burma was the lack of training of British and Indian soldiers. Regimental training centres were unable to produce soldiers trained for any one theatre, as the battalions of a regiment were dispersed between formations and theatres all over the world. On 14 June 1943, the 14th Division was converted to a Training Division. It was stationed at Chhindwara in Madhya Pradesh, where the terrain and vegetation matched the conditions likely to be encountered in Burma, but the comparatively mild climate allowed training throughout the year. The division was commanded by Major General Alfred Curtis. Although its purpose was to supply jungle-trained reinforcements to Fourteenth Army which controlled operations on India's eastern frontier and in Burma, it reported directly to General Claude Auchinleck, the Commander-in-Chief, India, and his headquarters GHQ India.

Recruits who had already received basic training in regimental depots were posted to units in 14th Division, to undertake jungle training and live-firing exercises. On completion of this advanced training, they were then assigned to divisional replacement camps, ready to report to their units when required. The division also ran longer courses for officers and NCOs.

=== Order of Battle as Training Division, 14 August 1943 ===
General Officer Commanding: Major General Alfred Curtis

- 47th Indian Infantry Brigade
  - 7th Battalion, 13th Frontier Force Rifles
  - 14th Battalion, 11th Sikh Regiment
  - 15th Battalion, 10th Baluch Regiment
- 55th Indian Infantry Brigade
  - 14th Battalion, 6th Rajputana Rifles
  - 15th Battalion, 5th Mahratta Light Infantry
  - 16th Battalion, 1st Punjab Regiment
- 109th Indian Infantry Brigade
  - 9th Battalion, 7th Rajput Regiment
  - 16th Battalion, 8th Punjab Regiment
  - 6th Battalion, 2nd Punjab Regiment
- Divisional Units
  - 10th Field Regiment, RIA
  - 16th Anti-tank Regiment, RIA
  - 44th Light Anti-aircraft Regiment, RA
  - 14th Light Anti-aircraft Regiment, RIA
  - 56th, 59th, 484th Field Companies, IE
  - 50th, 306th Field Park Company, IE

=== Dissolution ===
The division was disbanded on 31 August 1945, shortly after the end of the war.

== Assigned brigades ==
All these brigades were assigned or attached to the division at some time during World War II

- 23rd Indian Infantry Brigade
- 36th Indian Infantry Brigade
- 37th Indian Infantry Brigade
- 47th Indian Infantry Brigade
- 49th Indian Infantry Brigade
- 123rd Indian Infantry Brigade
- 4th Indian Infantry Brigade
- 71st Indian Infantry Brigade
- 6th British Infantry Brigade
