= 55th Indian Infantry Brigade =

- Active: 1942–1945
- Country: (British Raj) British India
- Allegiance: British Empire
- Branch: British Indian Army
- Type: Infantry
- Size: Brigade
- Engagements: Burma Campaign

Commanders
- Notable commanders: Brigadier J M Hunt; Brigadier P H Gates

The 55th Indian Infantry Brigade was an infantry brigade formation of the Indian Army during World War II. It was formed in India in April 1942 and assigned to the 7th Indian Infantry Division. In July to September 1942, it was attached to the North Western Army. Afterwards the brigade was assigned to the 14th Indian Infantry Division and took part in the Burma Campaign. Apart from a short period in May 1943, the brigade remained with the 14th Division until the end of the war and was 14th Division was allocated as a training division, the brigade was reorganised as a training brigade in June 1943.

== Formation ==
- 1st Battalion, 8th Gurkha Rifles Apr to June 1942
- 8th Battalion, 6th Rajputana Rifles April to August 1942 and October 1942 to January 1943
- 5th Battalion, 9th Jat Regiment May to August 1942
- 2nd Battalion, 1st Punjab Regiment September 1942 to July 1943
- MG Battalion, 9th Jat Regiment October to December 1942
- 1st Battalion, 17th Dogra Regiment January to February 1943
- 1st Battalion, 7th Rajput Regiment January to February 1943
- 5th Battalion, 8th Punjab Regiment January to February 1943
- 8th Battalion, 6th Rajputana Rifles March to May 1943
- 1st Battalion, 15th Punjab Regiment April 1943
- 6th Battalion, 11th Sikh Regiment April to May 1943
- 14th Battalion, 12th Frontier Force Regiment May to June 1943
- 14th Battalion, 6th Rajputana Rifles July 1943 to August 1945
- 15th Battalion, 5th Mahratta Light Infantry July 1943 to August 1945
- 15th Battalion, 1st Punjab Regiment August 1943 to August 1945
- 14th Battalion, 4th Bombay Grenadiers March to August 1945

== See also ==
- List of Indian Army Brigades in World War II
