= Claude Ernest Pert =

British Indian Army officer

Major-General Claude Ernest Pert CB CVO DSO
- Born: 29 September 1898
- Died: 14 March 1982 (aged 83)
- Military career
- Allegiance: United Kingdom
- Branch: British Indian Army
- Service years: 1917–1948
- Rank: Major-General
- Units: 17th Cavalry; 15th Lancers; Probyn's Horse
- Commands: Probyn's Horse; 255th Indian Armoured Brigade; 1st Armoured Division (India)
- Conflicts: World War I; Sinai and Palestine campaign; World War II; Burma campaign
- Awards: Companion of The Most Honourable Order of the Bath; Commander of the Royal Victorian Order; Distinguished Service Order
- Other work: Manager of the Guards Polo Club

Major-General Claude Ernest Pert, CB, CVO, DSO (29 September 1898 – 14 March 1982) was a senior cavalry officer in the British Indian Army, and British India polo champion.

== Biography ==
Pert was born 29 September 1898 in British India, the third son of Mr. F. J. Pert of the Indian Civil Service. He was educated at Clifton College from May 1913 to July 1916, then trained as an officer at Wellington Cadet College in India, and commissioned as a second lieutenant on the Unattached List for the Indian Army on 18 June 1917. Within a few days, on 23 June, he was admitted into the Indian Army, joining the 17th Cavalry, and was promoted to lieutenant on 18 June 1918. He was posted away from his regiment to the Egyptian Expeditionary Force fighting in Palestine, serving with the 2nd Battalion, 124th Duchess of Connaught's Own Baluchistan Infantry and an Imperial Service Cavalry unit between 13 August to 31 October 1918.

After the war he returned to his regiment and saw further service in Waziristan on the North West Frontier in 1921, receiving promotion to captain on 18 June 1921. The 17th Cavalry and the 37th Lancers were amalgamated on 16 February 1922 to form the 15th Lancers. Pert married Lillian Katherine Nicholls (died 1980) the same year.

Pert participated in the 1927 International Polo Cup, playing for the United Kingdom against the United States at Meadow Brook.

He served as adjutant of the governor of Bombay's bodyguard from 1928 to 1930, and was promoted to major on 18 June 1935. In 1937 he was part of the polo team who won the Roehampton Trophy.

In 1937 the 15th Lancers were converted to a training regiment, and he transferred to Probyn's Horse (5th King Edward VII's Own Lancers) on 31 August 1937, where he was appointed temporary second-in-command on 1 October 1939. He was promoted to the acting rank of lieutenant-colonel as commanding officer of Probyn's Horse on 1 March 1941.

He was appointed temporary lieutenant-colonel on 1 June 1941, receiving promotion to the substantive rank on 18 June 1943, though this was later cancelled and then backdated to 3 September 1942. He was appointed acting colonel on 11 March 1943.

Later he was appointed second-in-command of the 251st Indian Tank Brigade, and in November 1943 commanding officer of the 255th Indian Armoured Brigade, a post he held until May 1945. He was appointed temporary colonel on 28 February 1944, and temporary brigadier on 1 February 1945. He was awarded the Distinguished Service Order "in recognition of gallant and distinguished services in Burma" on 24 May 1945, ranked as temporary brigadier, Indian Armoured Corps.

Appointed acting major-general on 31 May 1945, he served as the general officer commanding 1st Armoured Division of the Indian Army. He received a mention in dispatches on 19 July 1945 for his service in Burma, as a temporary colonel, Indian Armoured Corps. Pert was appointed Director of Armoured Fighting Vehicles on 7 June 1946, and promoted to colonel on 11 February 1947.

He was made a Companion of the Order of the Bath on 14 August 1947, ranked as a colonel (temporary major-general), Probyn's Horse. He retired from the army on 31 August 1948, and was granted the honorary rank of major-general.

In retirement he served as the manager of the Guards Polo Club from 1957 to 1975. The club now awards the "Claude Pert Cup" in his honour.

He was appointed a Commander in the Royal Victorian Order on 1 January 1976.

He died on 14 March 1982.
