= Indian XXI Corps =

The Indian XXI Corps was an Army Corps of the Indian Army during the Second World War. It served in the Tenth Army in 1942.

== Formation ==
Lieutenant-General Mosley Mayne

- 8th Indian Infantry Division, Major-General Charles Harvey
- 10th Indian Infantry Division, Major-General Alan Blaxland
- 6th Indian Infantry Division commanded by Major-General J.N. Thomson
- 31st Indian Armoured Division, Major-General Robert Wordsworth
- 10th Indian Motor Brigade, Brigadier Harold Redman
