= 96 Medium Regiment (India) =

Indian Army artillery unit

- Active: 1964 – present
- Country: India
- Allegiance: India
- Branch: Indian Army
- Type: Artillery
- Size: Regiment
- Motto(s): SARVATRA, IZZAT-O-IQBAL “Everywhere with Honour and Glory”.
- Colors: "Red & Navy Blue"

Insignia
- Abbreviation: 96 Med Regt

96 Medium Regiment is part of the Regiment of Artillery of the Indian Army.

== Formation ==
96 Medium Regiment was raised as 96 Composite (Towed) Regiment on 1 March 1964 under the command of Lieutenant Colonel Swarup Singh Rai at Haldwani. The Regiment was raised as pure SIC (South Indian Community) unit and the equipment held with the unit during raising was the 75 Pounder. It was subsequently converted to a field regiment and is now a medium regiment.

== Operations ==
Indo-Pakistani War of 1965 (Operation Ablaze and Operation Riddle)

The Regiment was part of a Mountain Division in the Eastern Command in Dinjan, Assam, when the Indo-Pakistani conflict was taking final shape all over the western front. The formations of Eastern command were moved to battle position to ward off any threat to national borders. 96 Field Regiment was given the task of Pakistani para troopers. 962 Field Battery stayed in Duliajan area to prevent any sabotage in or around oil installations and railways. 120 mm Brandt mortars were replaced by three 75 mm guns and twelve 75/24 Pack Howitzers.

Operation Bluestar

Maj CK Pasi took part in the operations in Punjab in 1984.

Operation Trident

Two batteries moved to the Western sector on 3 February 1987 and one moved to the Southern sector on 21 February 1987 to participate in Operation Brasstacks.

Operation Pawan

The regiment sent a contingent consisting of the Observation Post and Battery Commander to join the Indian Peace Keeping Force (IPKF) in Sri Lanka.

Operation Rakshak

Between 1990 and 1994, the unit was part of Counter Insurgency Operations in Jammu and Kashmir.

Operation Rhino

The regiment was involved in Counter Insurgency Operations in Assam between December 1994 and December 1996.

Operation Parakram

The regiment was part of a Mountain Brigade and was based at the base of Tiger Hill. It provided devastating fire power and helped in capturing dominating heights. For its efforts, it was awarded the Chief of the Army Staff's unit citation on 15 January 2004.

United Nations Disengagement Observer Force

The regiment was part of the United Nations Disengagement Observer Force (UNDOF) in Golan Heights, Syria during 2021-2024.

== Achievements ==
- The regiment has won 2 Sena Medals, 17 Chief of the Army Staff's Commendation Cards, 2 Vice Chief of the Army Staff's Commendation Cards, 20 General Officer Commanding in Chief's Commendation Cards, 1 C-in-C Commendation Card, 3 DG NSG Commendation Cards, 20 Head of Mission & Force Commander's Commendations, 16 Deputy Force Commander's Commendation Cards, 7 Sector Commander's Commendation Cards, 1 DG Assam Rifles Commendation Card and 2 Corp's Commander's appreciations.
- It has also won the General Officer Commanding in Chief's (Southern Command) unit citation in 2013 and General Officer Commanding in Chief's (Eastern Command) unit citation in 2017.
- The unit awarded the coveted 'Head of Mission and Force Commander Unit Appreciation' five times for its outstanding performance during its tour of duty as part of the UNDOF in 2021-24.

== War Cry ==
The war cry of the regiment is Veeran Yaar – 96!, 96!, 96!– which translates to Who is the bravest? - 96!, 96!, 96!. It was coined by Lieutenant Colonel (later Major General) MS Chadha AVSM.

== See also ==
- List of artillery regiments of Indian Army
