= 255th Brigade =

255th Brigade may refer to:

- 255th Indian Tank Brigade, British India
- 255th Brigade, Royal Field Artillery, United Kingdom
