= 251st Brigade =

251st Brigade may refer to:

- 251st Indian Tank Brigade, British India
- 251st Brigade, Royal Field Artillery, United Kingdom
