= Christopher Maltby =

British Indian Army general

Major-General Christopher Maltby CB MC DL
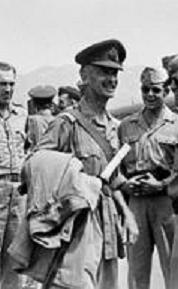
- Born: 13 January 1891; India
- Died: 6 September 1980 (aged 89); Taunton, England
- Relatives: Air Vice Marshal Sir Paul Maltby (brother)
- Military career
- Allegiance: United Kingdom
- Branch: British Indian Army
- Service years: 1908–1946
- Rank: Major-General
- Service number: 199269
- Units: 9th Jat Regiment
- Commands: British Troops in China (1941); 19th Indian Infantry Brigade (1940–41); 3rd Indian Infantry Brigade (1939–40); 3rd Battalion 9th Jat Regiment (1937–39); 4th Battalion 9th Rajput Regiment (1936–37)
- Conflicts: First World War; Russian Civil War; Third Waziristan Campaign; Second World War
- Awards: Companion of the Order of the Bath; Military Cross; Mentioned in Despatches (4)

Major-General Christopher Michael Maltby, CB, MC, DL (13 January 1891 – 6 September 1980) was a senior officer in the British Indian Army who served as Commander of British Troops in Hong Kong in 1941 before the Japanese invasion of Hong Kong, after which he became a prisoner of war.

== Military career ==
Educated at Bedford School, Maltby attended the Royal Military College, Sandhurst, from where he was commissioned onto the Unattached List For Indian Army, with a view to an appointment to the Indian Army.

After passing his probationary year attached to a British Army regiment stationed in India, he was posted to the 95th Russell's Infantry of the Indian Army. From 1913 to 1914, he served in the Persian Gulf.

In October 1914, the 95th Russell's Infantry were sent to reinforce the British garrison in Muscat, as information had been received that the Imam and many local tribal leaders intended to attack.

It was while based here that 95th Russell's Infantry took part in operations across the Straits of Hormuz, at Jask and Chahbar in Persia, during April and May 1915. It was during these operations that Maltby was awarded a Military Cross for gallantry displayed when defending the British post at Chabhar on the night of 2 May 1915.

Later in the year the 95th Russell's Infantry returned to India and by October 1916 were stationed at Nowshera. While at Nowshera, to mobilize as part of the Peshawar Division on 1 October 1916. A few days later it left for Peshawar from where it was engaged in minor punitive columns on the North West Frontier until July 1917 when it was ordered to Saugor to mobilise for overseas service.

On 29 September 1917, the battalion landed at Basra; and after about a year in Mesopotamia it was despatched in November 1918 to Turkey.

In addition to being awarded the Military Cross, was wounded and thrice mentioned in despatches.

With the war over, he then went to the Staff College in Quetta in 1923. He served on the North West Frontier in India and then became a general staff officer at Army Headquarters in India in 1925. He went on to the RAF Staff College at Andover in 1927 and then was appointed Deputy Assistant Adjutant General at Army Headquarters in India in 1930.

He was appointed to command the 3rd battalion, 9th Jat regiment on 1 February 1937, which in October 1937 moved to Landi Kotal on the North West Frontier of India and took part in the operations during 1937, for which he was again Mentioned in Despatches.

He was appointed an instructor at the Staff College at Quetta from June to December 1938 before being appointed a General Staff Officer, grade 1, Baluchistan District in India in January 1939.

He served in the Second World War. On 24 September 1939, he was appointed Commander of 3rd Jhelum Brigade, then as Commander of the Calcutta Brigade, and finally as Commander of 19th Indian Infantry Brigade in Deccan District in India.

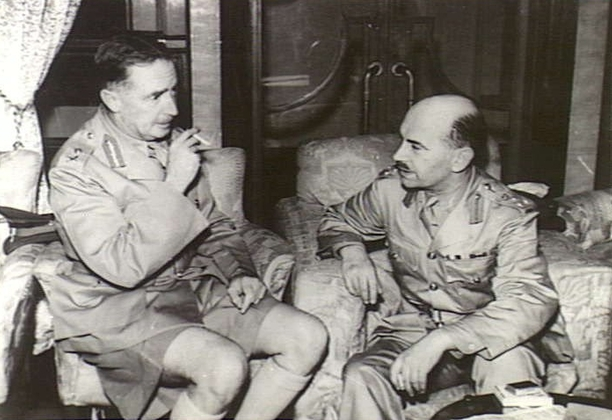
Canadian Brigadier John K. Lawson (right) with General Christopher Maltby

He was made Commander of British Troops in China in August 1941. He was unimpressed when he assumed the post on 19 July 1941. In his first letter to his wife upon arrival, he wrote, "the Governor is a very sick man and only wants to go quietly, and there is still a tremendous lot to be done on the civil defence side, so I am afraid my start must be demanding things. Why must one always have to fight the civil administration?" Meanwhile, the Hong Kong sappers impressed Maltby during the ceremony on 1 August so much that he proposed to the War Office to raise a ‘Chinese infantry battalion’ with the prospect of ‘further expansion’ on 8 August. The War Office approved the proposal on 24 August; it was the beginning of the first locally raised Hong Kong infantry unit in the British Army, the Hong Kong Chinese Regiment.

He initially established a 10-mile line of defence known as Gin Drinkers Line across the Southern part of the mainland but was rapidly forced to withdraw his troops back to Hong Kong Island. General Takashi Sakai began a bombardment of the Island and, after a brief counter-attack by British Troops which commenced on 19 December 1941, Maltby surrendered to the Japanese at Queen's Pier on 25 December 1941. He was a prisoner of war from 1941 to 1945.

== Retirement ==
Reverting to his permanent rank of colonel, Maltby retired on 10 June 1946. He was granted the honorary rank of major-general on 10 June 1946. In 1953, Maltby was granted a commission as a Deputy lieutenant of Somerset, where he spent his remaining years, the last five of them a widower.

== Bibliography ==
- Smart, Nick (2005). Biographical Dictionary of British Generals of the Second World War. Barnesley: Pen & Sword. ISBN 1844150496.

Military offices
Preceded by Sir Edward Grassett	Commander of British Troops in China; August – December 1941	Vacant Japanese occupation of Hong Kong Title next held by Sir Francis Festing
