= General Haig =

General Haig may refer to:

- Alexander Haig (1924–2010), first U.S. Secretary of State under Ronald Reagan
- Brodie Haig (1886–1957), British Indian Army general
- Douglas Haig, 1st Earl Haig (1861–1928), commander of the British Expeditionary Force during much of the First World War
