= List of Indian Army brigades in World War II =

The Indian Army during World War II fought on three continents Europe, Africa and Asia. They also had to supply formations for home service. This list details the Cavalry, Armoured and Infantry brigades formed by the Indian Army during World War II.

== Cavalry brigades ==
- 1st (Risalpur) Cavalry Brigade
- 3rd (Meerut) Cavalry Brigade
- 4th (Secunderabad) Cavalry Brigade

== Armoured brigades ==
- 50th Indian Tank Brigade
- 251st Indian Tank Brigade previously called 1st Indian Armoured and 251st Indian Armoured Brigade
- 252nd Indian Armoured Brigade previously called 2nd Indian Armoured Brigade
- 254th Indian Tank Brigade previously called 4th Indian Armoured and 254th Indian Armoured Brigade
- 255th Indian Tank Brigade previously called 5th Indian Armoured and 255th Indian Armoured Brigade
- 267th Indian Armoured Brigade
- 268th Indian Armoured Brigade converted to 268th Indian Infantry Brigade October 1942

== Motor brigades ==
- 1st Indian Motor Brigade designated, but actually formed as 1st Indian Armoured Brigade
- 3rd Indian Motor Brigade
- 10th Indian Motor Brigade

== Anti aircraft brigades ==
- 1st Indian Anti-Aircraft Brigade
- 2nd Indian Anti-Aircraft Brigade
- 3rd Indian Anti-Aircraft Brigade

== Parachute brigades ==
- 14th Indian Parachute Brigade
- 50th Indian Parachute Brigade
- 77th Indian Parachute Brigade

== Infantry brigades ==
- 1st Indian Infantry Brigade
- 2nd Indian Infantry Brigade
- 3rd Indian Infantry Brigade
- 4th Indian Infantry Brigade
- 5th Indian Infantry Brigade
- 6th Indian Infantry Brigade
- 7th Indian Infantry Brigade
- 8th Indian Infantry Brigade
- 9th Indian Infantry Brigade
- 10th Indian Infantry Brigade
- 11th Indian Infantry Brigade
- 12th Indian Infantry Brigade
- 13th Indian Infantry Brigade
- 14th Indian Infantry Brigade
- 15th Indian Infantry Brigade
- 16th Indian Infantry Brigade
- 17th Indian Infantry Brigade
- 18th Indian Infantry Brigade
- 19th Indian Infantry Brigade
- 20th Indian Infantry Brigade
- 21st Indian Infantry Brigade
- 22nd Indian Infantry Brigade
- 23rd Indian Infantry Brigade
- 24th Indian Infantry Brigade
- 25th Indian Infantry Brigade
- 26th Indian Infantry Brigade
- 27th Indian Infantry Brigade
- 28th Indian Infantry Brigade
- 29th Indian Infantry Brigade
- 30th Indian Infantry Brigade
- 31st Indian Infantry Brigade
- 32nd Indian Infantry Brigade
- 33rd Indian Infantry Brigade
- 34th Indian States Forces Infantry Brigade
- 36th Indian Infantry Brigade
- 37th Indian Infantry Brigade
- 38th Indian Infantry Brigade
- 39th Indian Infantry Brigade
- 40th Indian Infantry Brigade
- 43rd Indian Infantry Brigade (Lorried)
- 44th Indian Infantry Brigade
- 45th Indian Infantry Brigade
- 46th Indian Infantry Brigade
- 47th Indian Infantry Brigade
- 48th Indian Infantry Brigade
- 49th Indian Infantry Brigade
- 51st Indian Infantry Brigade
- 53rd Indian Infantry Brigade
- 55th Indian Infantry Brigade
- 60th Indian Infantry Brigade
- 62nd Indian Infantry Brigade
- 63rd Indian Infantry Brigade
- 64th Indian Infantry Brigade
- 71st Indian Infantry Brigade
- 72nd Indian Infantry Brigade
- 73rd Indian Infantry Brigade
- 74th Indian Infantry Brigade
- 75th Indian Infantry Brigade
- 77th Indian Infantry Brigade
- 80th Indian Infantry Brigade
- 84th Indian Infantry Brigade
- 88th Indian Infantry Brigade
- 89th Indian Infantry Brigade
- 90th Indian Infantry Brigade
- 98th Indian Infantry Brigade
- 99th Indian Infantry Brigade
- 100th Indian Infantry Brigade
- 106th Indian Infantry Brigade
- 109th Indian Infantry Brigade
- 111th Indian Infantry Brigade
- 113th Indian Infantry Brigade
- 114th Indian Infantry Brigade
- 115th Indian Infantry Brigade
- 116th Indian Infantry Brigade
- 123rd Indian Infantry Brigade
- 150th Indian Infantry Brigade
- 155th Indian Infantry Brigade
- 161st Indian Infantry Brigade
- 268th Indian Infantry Brigade

== Named brigades ==
- Bannu Brigade
- Frontier Reserve Brigade
- Gardai Brigade
- Khojak Brigade
- Kohat Brigade
- Landi Kotal Brigade
- Lushai Brigade
- North Assam Indian Infantry Brigade
- Nowshera Brigade
- Peshawar Brigade
- Quetta Brigade
- Razmak Brigade
- Risalpur Training Brigade
- Thal Brigade
- Wana Brigade
- Zhob Brigade
