= 37th Indian Infantry Brigade =

- Active: 1941–1945
- Country: British India
- Allegiance: British Crown
- Branch: British Indian Army
- Size: Brigade
- Engagements: Burma Campaign

The 37th Indian Infantry Brigade was an Infantry formation of the Indian Army during the Second World War. It was formed in June 1941, at Quetta in India and assigned to the 14th Indian Infantry Division. The brigade was then assigned to the 23rd Indian Infantry Division in June 1942. It remained with the 23rd Division apart from an attachment to the 17th Indian Infantry Division between March and April 1944.

After the end of the Second World War, it took part in the British occupation of Indonesia during the Indonesian National Revolution.

== Formation ==
- 3rd Battalion, 5th Gurkha Rifles
- 3rd Battalion, 3rd Gurkha Rifles
- 3rd Battalion, 10th Gurkha Rifles

== See also ==
- List of Indian Army Brigades in World War II
