= 84th Indian Infantry Brigade =

- Active: May 1942 – October 1943
- Country: British India
- Branch: British Indian Army
- Part of: North Western Army

The 84th Indian Infantry Brigade was an Infantry formation of the Indian Army during World War II. It was formed in May 1942, in Hyderabad, Sindh, India where it was also known as the Upper Sind Force. It was intended to suppress a rebellion by the Hurs in the Sindh Desert. The brigade was under command of the North Western Army and eventually disbanded in October 1943.

== Composition ==
- 7th Battalion, 19th Hyderabad Regiment May 1942 to September 1943
- 8th Battalion, 15th Punjab Regiment May 1942 to May 1943
- 6th Battalion, 10th Baluch Regiment June 1942 to October 1943
- 7th Battalion, 13th Frontier Force Rifles June 1942 to May 1943
- 7th Battalion, Jammu and Kashmir Infantry November 1942 to February 1943

== See also ==
- List of Indian Army Brigades in World War II
