= Eric Goddard =

English soldier (1897–1992)

Eric Norman Goddard
- Born: 6 July 1897; Lambeth, London, England
- Died: 11 June 1992 (aged 94); Tunbridge Wells, Kent, England
- Military career
- Allegiance: United Kingdom
- Branch: British Indian Army; Indian Army
- Service years: 1915−1948
- Rank: Lieutenant General
- Service number: 103402
- Unit: 12th Frontier Force Regiment
- Commands: 4th Battalion, 15th Punjab Regiment; Landi Kotal Brigade; Southern Command, India
- Conflicts: World War I World War II
- Awards: Companion of the Order of the Bath; Companion of the Order of the Indian Empire; Commander of the Order of the British Empire; Lieutenant of the Royal Victorian Order; Military Cross
- Other work: Control Commission for Germany, 1949 to 1953; Director of Civil Defence for North-Western Region of England, 1955 to 1963

Lieutenant-General Eric Norman Goddard CB CIE CBE LVO MC and bar (6 July 1897 – 11 June 1992) was a regular soldier of the Indian Army who rose to the position of General Officer Commanding-in-Chief, Southern Command, India.

== Early life ==
The third son of Arthur Goddard, a London Chartered accountant, by his marriage to Isabel Catherine Roberts, he was born in London, educated at Dulwich College, then attended Quetta Cadet College in India and was commissioned into the Unattached List for the Indian Army 15 November 1915 and was admitted to the Indian Army 18 November 1915 and was posted to the 107th Pioneers.

== Military career ==
From October 1916 he was attached to the 128th Pioneers, with whom Goddard saw active service in Mesopotamia, Persia and Kurdistan between 1916 and 1919, being twice mentioned in despatches, made an Officer of the Order of the British Empire and receiving the Military Cross.

He was a General Staff Officer 3 grade at Army Headquarters, India, from 1923 to 1925. In March 1929 he joined the 3rd Battalion, 12th Frontier Force Regiment. He passed the Staff College, Quetta, in 1928–29, where his fellow students were John Crocker, Colin Gubbins, Douglas Gracey, Lionel Cox, Harold Lewis and Henry Davies, all future generals. After this he was posted as brigade major to the Nowshera Brigade from 1932 to 1934, seeing active service in the Chitral relief operation of 1932 (when he was again mentioned in despatches and gained a bar to his MC) and in the Mohmand operations of 1933 (again mentioned in despatches). He was promoted brevet major in 1933 and from April 1934 to April 1936 was a general staff officer grade 2 in Eastern Command. Appointed officer in command the King's Indian Orderly Officers, 1936, when he was appointed a Member of the Royal Victorian Order (4th class) and in December became commandant of the 4th Battalion, 15th Punjab Regiment.

In April 1939 he was promoted brevet colonel and colonel in command of administration, Burma Army, then in November 1940 brigade commander of the Landi Kotal Brigade. In December 1941 Goddard was promoted major-general in command of administration, Army in Burma, and saw service in Burma and on the Eastern front from then until December 1944. In 1943–1944 he was major-general in command of administration to the 11th Army Group and to Allied Land Forces in South East Asia, when he was mentioned in despatches a further four times and appointed CIE and CBE. In 1944 he was promoted a substantive major-general.

Following the end of the Second World War, Goddard was posted as general officer commanding-in-chief of Southern Command, India, serving from 1947, when he was promoted an acting lieutenant-general, until his retirement with the honorary rank of lieutenant-general in November 1948. In that role, he was responsible for the Goddard Plan for Operation Polo, the armed invasion by the Union of India of the princely state of Hyderabad, put into effect in September 1948 by Major-General Joyanto Nath Chaudhuri.

On his retirement from the Indian Army and the Southern Command in 1948, Goddard was succeeded by Maharaj Shri Rajendrasinhji Jadeja, the first Indian officer to take on the post.

== Later career ==
Goddard returned to Europe from India and next took on a special appointment to the Control Commission for Germany, serving from 1949 to 1953. He was director of Civil Defence for the North-Western Region of England, based in Manchester, from 1955 to 1963. At his death, he was the last living former army commander of the British Indian Army.

== Private life ==
On 25 May 1939 at Maymyo, Burma, Goddard married Elizabeth Lynch Prioleau Hamilton, daughter of Major Lynch Hamilton by his marriage to Frances Prioleau, and they had one son. At the time of his death in 1992 his address was given in Who's Who as Kent House, Camden Park, Tunbridge Wells, Kent. He was also President, East Lancashire Branch, British Red Cross, 1964–1966

== Publications ==
- Eric Goddard, 'The Indian Army – company and Raj', in Asian Affairs, vol. 7, issue 3 (1976), pp. 263–276

== Honours ==
- Officer of the Order of the British Empire, 1919
- Military Cross, January 1920
- Member of the Royal Victorian Order, 4th Class (MVO) 1936 - regraded as Lieutenant (LVO) in 1984
- Commander of the Order of the British Empire, 1942
- Companion of the Order of the Indian Empire, 1944
- Companion of the Bath, 1947

== Bibliography ==
- Smart, Nick (2005). Biographical Dictionary of British Generals of the Second World War. Barnesley: Pen & Sword. ISBN 1844150496.
