= Robert King (British Army officer) =

British Army general (1904–1983)

Major-General Robert King CB DSO OBE
- Born: 1904
- Died: 16 December 1983 (aged 78–79)
- Military career
- Allegiance: United Kingdom
- Branch: British Army
- Service years: 1924–1959
- Rank: Major-General
- Service number: 28105
- Unit: West Yorkshire Regiment
- Commands: 44th (Home Counties) Division (1954–56); 17th Infantry Brigade (1946–48); 1st Indian Infantry Brigade (1944–46)
- Conflicts: Second World War
- Awards: Companion of the Order of the Bath; Distinguished Service Order; Officer of the Order of the British Empire

Major-General Robert Charles Moss King, CB, DSO, OBE (1904 – 16 December 1983) was a British Army officer.

== Military career ==
After graduating from the Royal Military College, Sandhurst, King was commissioned into the West Yorkshire Regiment on 30 January 1924. Eric Bols and Cecil Firbank were among his graduates, both also future major generals.

King served in the Far East in the Second World War, for which he was awarded the Distinguished Service Order. After the war he became commander of the 17th Infantry Brigade in Germany in December 1946, deputy director of Military Operations at the War Office in February 1953, and General Officer Commanding 44th (Home Counties) Division in January 1954. His last appointment was as Director of Quartering at the War Office in February 1957 before retiring in April 1959.

King died on 16 December 1983.

Military offices
Preceded by Otway Herbert	GOC 44th (Home Counties) Division; 1954–1956	Succeeded by William Turner
