= Ouvry Roberts =

British Army general (1898–1986)

General Sir Ouvry Roberts GCB KBE DSO
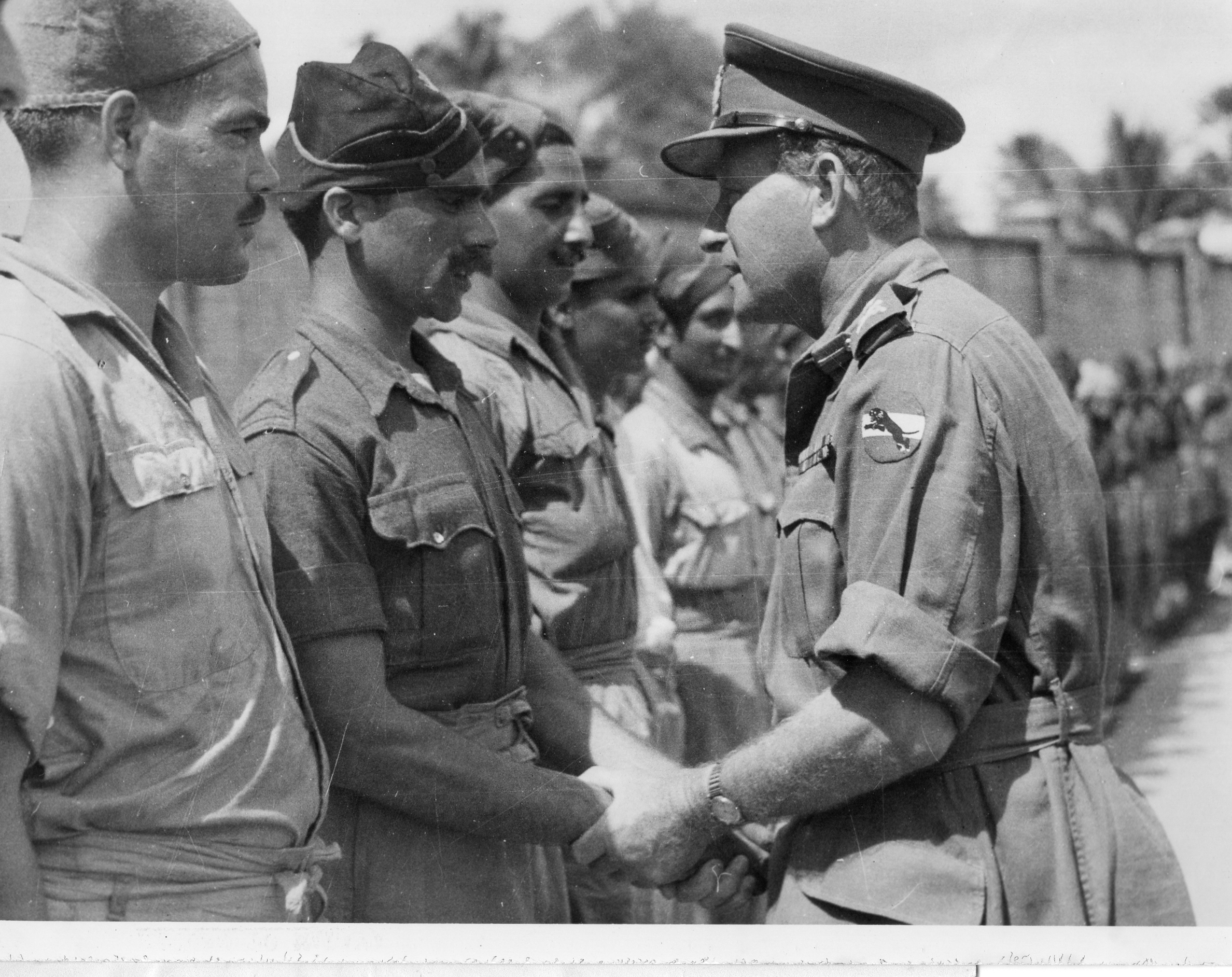
- Roberts greeting former Indian Army prisoners of war in Malaya, 1945.
- Born: 3 April 1898; Bogawantalawa, British Ceylon
- Died: 16 March 1986 (aged 87)
- Military career
- Allegiance: United Kingdom
- Branch: British Army
- Service years: 1917–1955
- Rank: General
- Service number: 10009
- Unit: Royal Engineers
- Commands: Southern Command (1949–52); Northern Ireland District (1948–49); XXXIV Indian Corps (1945); 23rd Indian Infantry Division (1943–45); 16th Infantry Brigade (1942); 20th Indian Infantry Brigade (1941)
- Conflicts: First World War; Third Anglo-Afghan War; Second World War
- Awards: Knight Grand Cross of the Order of the Bath; Knight Commander of the Order of the British Empire; Companion of the Distinguished Service Order; Mentioned in Despatches

General Sir Ouvry Lindfield Roberts, GCB, KBE, DSO (3 April 1898 – 16 March 1986) was a senior officer of the British Army and the British Indian Army during the First and Second World Wars.

== Military career ==
Educated at Cheltenham College, the Royal Military Academy, Woolwich and King's College, Cambridge, Ouvry Roberts was commissioned into the Royal Engineers on 6 June 1917. He served on the North West Frontier of India during the Third Anglo-Afghan War in 1919 and in Waziristan 1919–21.

Roberts played first-class cricket for the University of Cambridge in 1925, and for the Free Foresters in 1926. After attending the Staff College, Camberley from 1934 to 1935, he served as Deputy Director of Military Operations and Intelligence in India from 17 September 1939 to 28 January 1941.

In January 1941, Roberts was appointed GSO1 (Chief Staff Officer) of the 10th Indian Infantry Division, which was then forming at Ahmednagar in India. Three months later the division was ordered to Iraq. The RAF training base at Habbaniya, defended by 1,200 locally recruited Assyrians and Kurds and some armoured cars, was threatened by an Iraqi force in late April and three companies from the 1st Battalion, King's Own Royal Regiment (Lancaster) were sent by air to reinforce the base. Roberts was sent to Habbaniya on 1 May to review the situation, and assumed the de facto command of the land operations at RAF Habbaniya after the departure of Air Vice Marshal Harry George Smart who had been injured in a car accident. Roberts was appointed a Companion of the Distinguished Service Order for commanding the ground forces defending RAF Habbaniya.

Roberts commanded what became known as the "Habbaniya Brigade" and, on 19 May 1941, participated in the successful capture of Fallujah. The Habbaniya Brigade was formed in the week following the end of the Iraqi siege of the British garrison at Habbaniya. Roberts formed the brigade by grouping the infantry reinforcements from Basra (2/4 Gurkha) and from Kingcol (1 Essex). Roberts returned to 10th Indian Division after completing what his divisional commander, Major General William Slim, later described as "one of the best single-handed jobs any officer of his then rank had performed in the war".

As chief staff officer, Roberts played an important role in the 10th Indian Division's involvement in the Euphrates expedition during the Syria–Lebanon campaign in July 1941 and the Anglo-Soviet Invasion of Iran a month later, earning him promotion to commanding officer of the division's 20th Indian Infantry Brigade in Iraq in January 1942.

From 1 July 1942 until 24 January 1943, Roberts was the commanding officer of the 16th Infantry Brigade in Ceylon. As the threat of a Japanese invasion of Ceylon receded, 16th Infantry Brigade was redeployed in July 1943 while Roberts was appointed chief staff officer (Brigadier General Staff) of IV Corps at Imphal commanded by Lieutenant General Geoffry Scoones and which formed part of Slim's Fourteenth Army.

On 10 August 1943 Roberts was promoted to acting major general and appointed general officer commanding 23rd Indian Infantry Division, part of IV Corps. The division's units were heavily involved in the decisive Battle of Imphal and the subsequent Allied advance into Burma. In August 1944 the division was withdrawn to India. Roberts was made a Commander of the Order of the British Empire on 8 February 1945. He was promoted substantive major general on 17 February with seniority from 5 June 1944.

On 12 March 1945 Roberts was promoted acting lieutenant general and appointed general officer commanding XXXIV Indian Corps, which was tasked with Operation Roger, an amphibious assault on the Kra Peninsula in Thailand. Events moved more rapidly than anticipated and Operation Roger was canceled. The corps was then tasked with Operation Zipper, an amphibious landing on the coast of Malaya. In the event, the landings, which took place in September 1945, were unopposed, taking place days after the Japanese surrender.

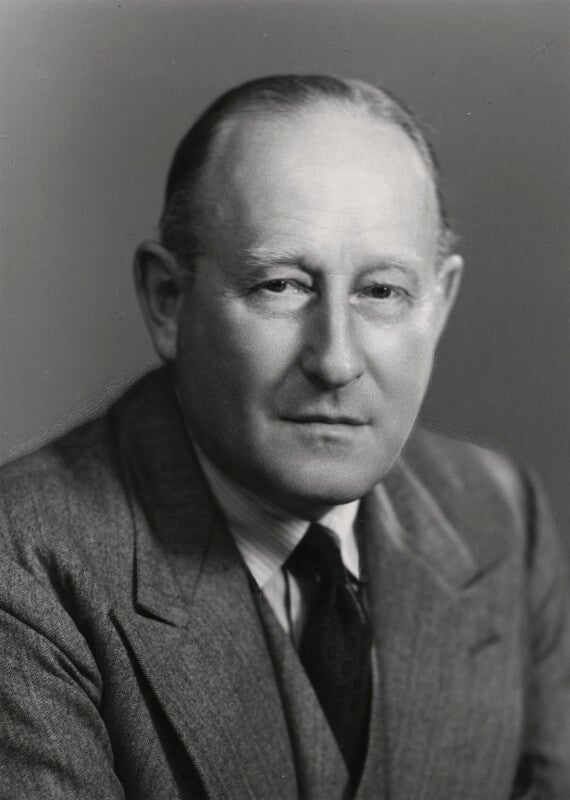
Roberts in 1953

After the war Roberts was appointed as Vice Adjutant-General at the War Office in 1945. He became General Officer Commanding Northern Ireland District in 1948 and General Officer Commanding-in-Chief of Southern Command in 1949. He became Quartermaster-General to the Forces in 1952 and retired in 1955, widely regarded as one of the high achievers of the Second World War.

Roberts was Aide-de-camp general to the Queen from 1952 to 1955, and Colonel Commandant the Royal Engineers from 1952 to 1962.

== Retirement ==
In retirement Roberts was a Director of Grosvenor Laing and then President of Grosvenor Laing from 1955 to 1960.

== Personal life ==
In November 1955, he married (Joyce) Mary Segar Scorer (27 July 1921 – 25 January 2011), the sister of Lincoln innovative architect Sam Scorer, in the King Henry VII Chapel, Westminster Abbey. They had a son on 25 January 1957.

== Bibliography ==
- Lyman, Robert (2006). Iraq 1941: The Battles for Basra, Habbaniya, Fallujah and Baghdad. Campaign Series. Oxford: Osprey Publishing. ISBN 1-84176-991-6.
- Mead, Richard (2007). Churchill's Lions: a biographical guide to the key British generals of World War II. Stroud (UK): Spellmount. ISBN 978-1-86227-431-0.
- Slim, William (1956). Defeat into Victory. London: Cassell. OCLC 253543428.
- Smart, Nick (2005). Biographical Dictionary of British Generals of the Second World War. Barnesley: Pen & Sword. ISBN 1844150496.
- Wavell, Archibald (1946). Despatch on Operations in Iraq, East Syria and Iran from 10th April, 1941 to 12th January, 1942. London: War Office. in "No. 37685". The London Gazette (Supplement). 13 August 1946. pp. 4093–4102.

Military offices
| Preceded by Reginald Savory | GOC 23rd Indian Infantry Division; 1943–1945 | Succeeded by Douglas Cyril Hawthorn |
| Preceded by Gerard Bucknall | GOC British Army in Northern Ireland; 1948–1949 | Succeeded by Sir Reginald Denning |
| Preceded by Sir John Harding | GOC-in-C Southern Command; 1949–1952 | Succeeded by Sir Ernest Down |
| Preceded by Sir Ivor Thomas | Quartermaster-General to the Forces; 1952–1955 | Succeeded by Sir Maurice Chilton |
