= Razmak Brigade =

- Active: 1939–1945
- Country: British India
- Allegiance: British Crown
- Branch: British Indian Army
- Size: Brigade

Commanders
- Notable commanders: Brigadier HV Lewis; Lieutenant Colonel EW Langlands; Brigadier RAB Freeland

The Razmak Brigade was an Infantry formation of the Indian Army during World War II. It was in existence in September 1939, for service on the North West Frontier. It was normal practice for newly formed battalions to be posted to the North West Frontier for service before being sent to Africa, Burma, or Italy.

== Formation ==
These units served with the brigade during the war

- 1st Leicestershire Regiment
- 1/8th Gurkha Rifles
- 2/1st Gurkha Rifles
- 2/7th Rajput Regiment
- 25th Mountain Regiment Indian Artillery
- 3/10th Baluch Regiment
- 5/11th Sikh Regiment
- 1/19th Hyderabad Regiment
- 1st Royal Warwickshire Regiment
- 2nd Suffolk Regiment
- 2/2nd Gurkha Rifles
- 1st Patiala Infantry
- 1/10th Gurkha Rifles
- 1st Queen's Royal Regiment
- 6/5th Mahratta Light Infantry
- 5/8th Punjab Regiment
- 7/11th Sikh Regiment
- 1st Royal Warwickshire Regiment
- 5/8th Punjab Regiment
- 2nd King's Own Scottish Borderers
- 4/17th Dogra Regiment
- 20th Mountain Regiment IA
- 4/9th Gurkha Rifles
- 4/3rd Gurkha Rifles
- 1/16th Punjab Regiment
- 15/13th Frontier Force Rifles
- 2nd Green Howards
- 6/8th Punjab Regiment
- 26th Mountain Regiment IA
- 7/1st Punjab Regiment
- 15/10th Baluch Regiment
- 3/4th Gurkha Rifles
- 8/2nd Punjab Regiment
- 9/19th Hyderabad Regiment
- 14/14th Punjab Regiment
- 4/2nd Gurkha Rifles
- 7th York and Lancaster Regiment
- 6/18th Royal Garhwal Rifles
- 7th Jammu and Kashmir Infantry
- 5/1st Gurkha Rifles
- 1st Wiltshire Regiment
- 10th Field Company Indian Engineers
- 7th Light Tank Company RA
- Faridkot Field Company Indian States Forces
- 482nd Field Company IE
- 366th Field Company IE

== See also ==
- List of Indian Army Brigades in World War II
