= 23rd Infantry Division (India) =

- Active: 1942-1947; 1959-present
- Country: (British Raj) British India; India
- Allegiance: British Empire; India
- Branch: British Indian Army; Indian Army
- Type: Infantry
- Size: Division
- Engagements: Battle of Imphal

Commanders
- Current commander: Major General Sajjan Singh Maan,
- Notable commanders: Major-General Reginald Savory; Major General Ouvry Lindfield Roberts

The 23rd Infantry Division is an infantry division of the Indian Army. It was raised as a part of the Indian Army during World War II. It fought in the Burma Campaign and the Battle of Surabaya during the Indonesian National Revolution.

== History ==
The division was raised on 1 January 1942, at Jhansi in Central India. Its badge was a red fighting cock on a red circle. (The animal was chosen by Major General Reginald Savory, the division's first commander, as one which would offend neither the Moslem nor Hindu soldiers of the division.

In May that year, while the division was still forming, it was ordered to Imphal in Manipur, where Burma Corps was retreating, having been driven out of Burma by the Japanese. Imphal lay within the mountainous frontier between India and Burma, and the division was ordered to move while the monsoon season was at its height. Movement was difficult, and disease (mainly malaria, but also typhus) was rampant. The division's chief claim to respect lies in holding its positions in these trying conditions, while also trying to undertake basic training.

On 3 June 1943, Major General Savory was promoted and appointed Director of Infantry in India. The division was temporarily commanded by Brigadier Collingridge of 37th Brigade until 15 August, when Major General Ouvry Lindfield Roberts, who had gained widespread respect by his handling of operations in the Middle East, was appointed.

=== Battle of Imphal ===
In March, 1944, the Japanese launched a major attack on the British troops at Imphal. At the time, 23rd Division was the reserve unit for Indian IV Corps. After its previous service in Imphal, the division was no less than 5,000 men short of establishment (about 18,500). This was due mainly to disease, and poor administration in the rear areas in 1943, which prevented many recovering sick men from rejoining the division.

When the Japanese offensive began, Indian 17th Infantry Division was cut off in its forward position at Tiddim. One brigade of 23rd division was left to hold Imphal while the remainder of the division was sent to help extricate the 17th Division. Once the two divisions had linked up, they retreated to Bishenpur south of Imphal, being supplied by parachute drops.

The 23rd Division was then sent to Kanglatongbi, north of Imphal, where Japanese troops had cut the road linking Imphal with India and were threatening a major supply dump. The Japanese were held back while the dump was emptied of stores.

In June, all the divisions at Imphal were reorganised and repositioned. 23rd Division defended the Shenam Saddle southeast of Imphal against the last Japanese attacks in this area.

=== Operation Zipper ===
After the end of the Battle of Imphal, the division was withdrawn to India. After recuperating, it began training for future operations in Malaya. Major General Roberts was promoted to command Indian XXXIV Corps, and the division was commanded by Major General Douglas Hawthorn. In mid-1945, the division was due to take part in Operation Zipper, a landing on the west coast of Malaya, as part of XXXIV Corps. Although forestalled by the Japanese surrender, the landing took place unopposed, as the quickest means of sending troops to Malaya to enforce the surrender.

Later that year, the division was sent to Java, where the end of the war had brought widespread disorder and conflict between the restored Dutch East Indies colonial regime and pro-independence movements. The division was broken up in Java in 1947, and its units were merged into the Indian 5th Infantry Division.

=== Postwar ===
Current Divisional HQ is located at Dipatoli Cantonment, Ranchi in Jharkhand. The division was raised 1 September 1959 for the Nagaland insurgency when GOC Assam was redesignated as GOC 23rd Infantry Division.

=== Current Status of 23 Infantry Division ===
There are 4 brigades in 23 Infantry Division. They are:

- 23 Artillery Brigade (Dipatoli Cantt, Ranchi, Jharkhand)
- 61 Infantry Brigade (Dipatoli Cantt, Ranchi, Jharkhand)
- 167 Infantry Brigade (Shahjahanpur Cantt, Shahjahanpur, Uttar Pradesh)
- 301 Infantry Brigade (MONUSCO, South Africa)

== 23 Artillery Brigade ==
The Arty Brigade is situated in Deepatoli Cantonment in Ranchi and consist of many units. Earlier 17 Corps’s only Sata Bty was also a part of brigade which also coordinated with 17 Corp Artillery Brigade was handed over to 17 Corps. The last existing Sata Bty to Brigade was 632 Sata Bty which moved to Ladakh and was replaced by 126 Sata Bty but 126 Sata did not join the Brigade.

The units under the brigade are as follow:

1. 44 Field Regiment
2. 299 Field Regiment
3. 328 Field Regiment

== 61 Infantry Brigade ==
The infantry brigade was earlier situated in Namkom Military Station, Ranchi, Jharkhand. On 1 August 2019, the brigade is shifting to Dipatoli Cantt after the moving of 17 Corps to Panagarh, West Bengal. The brigade is assigned with 5 different Infantry Regiment. They are:

- 15th Battalion The Sikh Light Infantry
- 8th Battalion The Bihar Regiment
- 8th Battalion The Jammu and Kashmir Rifles
- 1st Battalion The Jammu and Kashmir Light Infantry
- 9th Battalion The Mahar Regiment

== 167 Infantry Brigade ==
The brigade is situated in Shahjahanpur Military Station, Shahjahanpur, Uttar Pradesh. The brigade consists of 4 Infantry Regiments. They are:

- 21st Battalion The Madras Regiment
- 4th Battalion The 4th Gorkha Rifles (4/4 GR)
- 2nd Battalion The Kumaon Regiment (Berar)

== 301 Infantry Brigade ==
The brigade is situated in and around Goma, in the Democratic Republic of Congo. The brigade is on the MONUSCO Mission from the year 2004 shifting from Ranchi to DRC.

== Order of battle ==
as of 1 April 1944

- GOC Major General Ouvry Roberts
- 1st Indian Infantry Brigade (Brigadier A. King)
  - 1st Battalion, Seaforth Highlanders
  - 1st Battalion, 16th Punjab Regiment
  - 1st Battalion, Patiala Infantry Regiment (State forces)
- 37th Indian Infantry Brigade (Brigadier P. C. Marindin)
  - 3rd Battalion, 3rd Gurkha Rifles
  - 3rd Battalion, 5th Royal Gurkha Rifles (Frontier Force)
  - 3rd Battalion, 10th Gurkha Rifles
- 49th Indian Infantry Brigade (Brigadier F. Esse)
  - 4th Battalion, 5th Mahratta Light Infantry
  - 6th Battalion, 5th Mahratta Light Infantry
  - 5th Battalion, 6th Rajputana Rifles
- Divisional Units
  - 2nd Battalion, 19th Hyderabad Regiment (divisional reconnaissance unit)
  - 4th Battalion, 12th Frontier Force Regiment (divisional machine-gun unit)
  - 158th Field Assault Regiment, Royal Artillery (The Fighting Cock 23rd div history)
  - 3rd Field Regiment Royal Indian Artillery (IA)
  - 28th Mountain Regiment IA
  - 2nd Anti-Tank/Light Anti-Aircraft Regiment IA
  - 23rd Indian Infantry Division Provost Unit
  - 23rd Indian Infantry Division Signal Unit
  - 69th, 71st, 91st Field Companies Royal Indian Engineers (IE)
  - 305th Field Park Company IE
  - 21st, 24th, 50th, 61st Animal Transport Companies Indian Army Service Corps (IASC)
  - 121st, 122nd, 123rd General Purpose Transport Companies IASC
  - 12th, 13th, 14th, 15th Composite Units IASC
  - 24th, 47th, 49th Indian Field Ambulances, Indian Army Medical Corps (IAMC)
  - 23rd Ordnance Field Park, Indian Army Ordnance Corps (IAOC)
  - 38th, 61st Infantry Workshop Companies, Indian Electrical and Mechanical Engineers (IEME)
  - 23rd Indian Division Recovery Company IEME

== Presently Units assigned in 23rd Infantry Division ==
- 23 IDSR (Infantry Division Signal Regiment)
- 23 IDOU (Infantry Division Ordnance Unit)
- 23 IDPU (Infantry Division Provost Unit)(CMP)
- 51 Armoured Regiment
- 100 (Independent) Tank Transporter Company (ASC)
- 107 Engineers Regiment (Bombay Sappers)
- 323 Field Hospital
- 423 Field Hospital
- 523 ASC Battalion
- 623 EME Battalion

== Assigned brigades ==
All these brigades were assigned or attached to the division at some time during World War II

- 63rd Indian Infantry Brigade
- 98th Indian Infantry Brigade
- 64th Indian Infantry Brigade
- 23rd Indian Infantry Brigade
- 1st Indian Infantry Brigade
- 49th Indian Infantry Brigade
- 123rd Indian Infantry Brigade
- 37th Indian Infantry Brigade
- 50th Indian Parachute Brigade
- 32nd Indian Infantry Brigade
- 37th Indian Infantry Brigade
- 268th Indian Infantry Brigade

== Bibliography ==
- Cole, Howard (1973). Formation Badges of World War 2. Britain, Commonwealth and Empire. London: Arms and Armour Press.
