= 30th Indian Infantry Brigade =

- Active: January 1943 – August 1943
- Country: British India
- Allegiance: British Empire
- Branch: British Indian Army
- Type: Infantry
- Size: Brigade
- Service: World War II

The 30th Indian Infantry Brigade was an infantry brigade of the British Indian Army that saw active service in the Indian Army during World War II. It served as a lines of communications formation in Iraq.

== History ==
The 30th Indian Infantry Brigade was formed on 15 January 1943, by the redesignation of HQ Baghdad Line of Communications Sub Area to conform with the reorganization of Paiforce. It formed part of 2nd Indian Infantry Division and was converted into HQ 2nd Indian Infantry Division in August 1943.

== Order of battle ==
The brigade included the following units in the Second World War:

- 21st King George V's Own Horse (15 January 1943 to 14 February 1943)
- 2nd Hyderabad Infantry, I.S.F. (15 January 1943 to 14 May 1943)
- 30th Brigade Signals Section

== Commanders ==
The 30th Brigade had the following commanders in the Second World War:

From	Rank	Name
January 1943	Brigadier	T.R. Henry
February 1943	Colonel	G.I. Blight

== See also ==
- List of Indian Army Brigades in World War II

== Bibliography ==
- Kempton, Chris (2003b). 'Loyalty & Honour', The Indian Army September 1939 – August 1947. Vol. Part II Brigades. Milton Keynes: The Military Press. ISBN 0-85420-238-2.
