= 155th Indian Infantry Brigade =

- Active: March 1944 – 15 December 1945
- Country: British India
- Allegiance: British Crown
- Branch: British Indian Army
- Type: Infantry
- Size: Brigade
- Part of: Peshawar District; North Western Army
- Garrison/HQ: Risalpur Cantonment
- Service: Second World War

The 155th Indian Infantry Brigade was an infantry brigade of the Indian Army during the Second World War.

The brigade was formed by the conversion of the Risalpur Training Brigade in March 1944, and it operated as a jungle training brigade.

== Order of battle ==
The brigade commanded the following units:

- 1st Battalion, Mahar Regiment (April to September 1944 and March to August 1945)
- 2nd Battalion, 8th Punjab Regiment (April to September 1944)
- 7th Battalion, 11th Sikh Regiment (May 1944 to May 1945)
- 7th Battalion, 1st Punjab Regiment (September 1944 to August 1945)
- 15th Battalion, 6th Rajputana Rifles (October 1944 to March 1945)
- 3rd Battalion, 11th Sikh Regiment (May to June 1945)
- 4th Battalion, 3rd Gurkha Rifles (June to August 1945)
- 6th Battalion, 10th Baluch Regiment (June to August 1945)
- 155th Brigade Signals Section

== See also ==
- List of Indian Army Brigades in World War II

== Bibliography ==
- Kempton, Chris (2003b). 'Loyalty & Honour', The Indian Army September 1939 – August 1947. Vol. Part II Brigades. Milton Keynes: The Military Press. ISBN 0-85420-238-2.
