= 1st Indian Infantry Brigade =

Indian military unit

- Active: 1939–1945
- Country: (British Raj) British India
- Allegiance: British Empire
- Branch: British Indian Army
- Type: Infantry
- Size: Brigade
- Engagements: Burma Campaign

Commanders
- Notable commanders: Robert King

The 1st Indian Infantry Brigade was an infantry brigade formation of the Indian Army during World War II. It was formed in September 1939, in Abbottabad in India. It was assigned to HQ Rawalpindi District until May 1942, when it joined the 23rd Indian Infantry Division until the end of the war.

== Formation ==
- 1st Battalion, 5th Gurkha Rifles to November 1940
- 2nd Battalion, 6th Gurkha Rifles to April 1940
- 2nd Battalion, 5th Gurkha Rifles February to December 1940 and January to June 1941
- 1st Battalion, 6th Gurkha Rifles April 1940 to February 1942
- 1st Battalion, Devonshire Regiment September 1940 to April 1941
- 1st Battalion, 7th Rajput Regiment October 1940 to September 1941
- 3rd Battalion, 5th Gurkha Rifles October 1940 to March 1941
- 3rd Battalion, 6th Gurkha Rifles October 1940 to March 1941
- 4th Battalion, 6th Gurkha Rifles March to October 1941
- 4th Battalion, 5th Gurkha Rifles March to October 1941
- 4th Battalion, 7th Gurkha Rifles March to October 1941
- 4th Battalion, 10th Gurkha Rifles March to October 1941
- 2nd Battalion, Nepalese Infantry (Rifle Regiment) April 1941 to February 1942
- 1st Battalion, Patiala Infantry April 1941 to August 1945
- 2nd Battalion, Suffolk Regiment June to September 1941
- 7th Battalion, 14th Punjab Regiment February to April 1942
- 1st Battalion, Assam Regiment April 1942 to March 1944
- 1st Battalion, Seaforth Highlanders May 1942 to August 1945
- 1st Battalion, 16th Punjab Regiment February to October 1943 and December 1943 to August 1945
- 9th Battalion, 12th Frontier Force Regiment February to April 1944
- Kalibahadur Regiment, Nepal May to August 1944
- 2nd Battalion, 19th Hyderabad Regiment June to July 1944
- 158th Field Artillery Regiment, Royal Artillery February to April 1944

== See also ==
- List of Indian Army brigades in World War II
