= 75th Indian Infantry Brigade =

- Active: 1942–1945
- Country: British India
- Allegiance: British Crown
- Branch: British Indian Army
- Size: Brigade

The 75th Indian Infantry Brigade was an Infantry formation of the Indian Army during World War II. It was formed in April 1942. In August 1944, it was renamed the Gardaí Brigade. It remained in India throughout the war and was disbanded in August 1945.

It was assigned in succession to:

- 15-Oct-1942 ? 14-Apr-1943 HQ Peshawar District
- 15-Apr-1943 ? 14-Aug-1944 HQ Kohat District

Both of these districts were part of Northern Command.

== Composition ==
=== 75th Brigade ===
- 8th Battalion, 2nd Punjab Regiment April 1942 to July 1943
- 14th Battalion, 14th Punjab Regiment April 1942 to August 1943 and February 1944 to August 1944
- 14th Battalion, 1st Punjab Regiment April 1942 to August 1944
- 9th Battalion, 19th Hyderabad Regiment November 1942 to August 1943
- 9th Battalion, 10th Baluch Regiment April 1943 to March 1944
- 16th Battalion, 5th Mahratta Light Infantry March 1944 to August 1944

=== Gardaí Brigade ===
- 14th Battalion, 1st Punjab Regiment August 1944 to October 1944
- 1st Battalion, Mahar Regiment October 1944 to March 1945
- 8th Battalion, 10th Baluch Regiment October 1944 to August 1945
- 15th Battalion, 7th Rajput Regiment October 1944 to August 1945
- 6th Battalion, 11th Sikh Regiment November 1944 to August 1945
- 9th Battalion, 9th Jat Regiment February 1945 to August 1945
- 8th Battalion, 9th Jat Regiment June 1945 to August 1945

== See also ==
- List of Indian Army Brigades in World War II
