= Wana Brigade =

- Active: 1930–1947
- Country: British India
- Allegiance: British Crown
- Branch: British Indian Army
- Size: Brigade

Commanders
- Notable commanders: Brigadier M. Saunders; Brigadier T. Milne; Lewis Heath; Brigadier CO Harvey

The Wana Brigade was an Infantry formation of the Indian Army during World War II. It was formed in February 1930, for service on the North West Frontier. During World War 2 it was normal practice for newly formed battalions to be posted to the North West Frontier for service before being sent to Africa, Burma or Italy.

== Formation ==
These units served in the brigade during World War II

- 1/18th Royal Garhwal Rifles
- 2/8th Gurkha Rifles
- 2/3rd Gurkha Rifles
- 2/2nd Punjab Regiment
- 3/8th Punjab Regiment
- 2/13th Frontier Force Rifles
- 2nd Jammu and Kashmir Rifles
- 1/3rd Gurkha Rifles
- 4/14th Punjab Regiment
- 3/6th Rajputana Rifles
- 6/12th Frontier Force Regiment
- 4/2nd Gurkha Rifles
- 4/7th Gurkha Rifles
- 14/6th Rajputana Rifles
- 5/15th Punjab Regiment
- 16/13th Frontier Force Rifles
- 15/6th Rajputana Rifles
- Shamsher Dal Regiment, Nepal
- 9th Jammu and Kashmir Infantry
- 7/17th Dogra Regiment
- 9th Field Company, Indian Engineers
- Sirmoor Field Company, Indian States Forces
- 96th Field Company IE
- Faridkot Field Company, ISF

== See also ==
- List of Indian Army Brigades in World War II
