= 34th Indian States Forces Infantry Brigade =

34th Indian State Forces Infantry Brigade
- Active: June 1941 – October 1944
- Country: British India
- Allegiance: British Crown
- Branch: British Indian Army
- Type: Infantry
- Size: Brigade
- Service: Second World War

The 34th Indian State Forces Infantry Brigade was an Infantry formation of the Indian Army during the Second World War.

== History ==
The brigade was formed in June 1941, in Karachi for garrison service in East Africa by the redesignation of HQ Baghdad Line of Communications Sub Area. In April 1942 it was broken up and in June 1942 converted to HQ Abadan Line of Communications Sub Area. This converted to 34th Indian Infantry Brigade in January 1944, under command 12th Indian Infantry Division. The brigade was finally disbanded in October 1944.

== Component units ==
The brigade commanded the following units in the Second World War:

- 3rd Battalion, 14th Punjab Regiment (June to September 1941)
- 4th Gwalior Maharaja Bahadur's Own Battalion, I.S.F. (May 1941 to May 1942)
- Alwar Jai Paltan, I.S.F. (May 1941 to May 1942)
- Jaipur Sawai Man Guards, I.S.F. (May 1941 to March 1942)
- Nabha Akal Infantry, I.S.F. (June 1941 to May 1942)
- Jodhpur Sardar Infantry, I.S.F. (June 1941 to March 1942)
- 2nd Hyderabad Infantry, I.S.F. (June to December 1942)
- Indore 1st Battalion Maharaja Holkar's Infantry, I.S.F. (January 1943 to 15 October 1944)
- 122nd Battalion, Royal Fusiliers (City of London Regiment) (attached April to October 1944)

== See also ==
- List of Indian Army Brigades in World War II

== Bibliography ==
- Kempton, Chris (2003b). 'Loyalty & Honour', The Indian Army September 1939 – August 1947. Vol. Part II Brigades. Milton Keynes: The Military Press. ISBN 0-85420-238-2.
