= 40th Indian Infantry Brigade =

- Active: 1942–1944
- Country: (British Raj) British India
- Allegiance: British Empire
- Branch: British Indian Army
- Size: Brigade

The 40th Indian Infantry Brigade was an administrative formation of the Indian Army during World War II. It was formed in September 1942, by the conversion of the HQ Shaiba Line of Communications Sub-Area. It served on lines of communication duties under the 2nd Indian Infantry Division in Iraq. In October 1944, the brigade was converted to HQ South Iraq Area. The final disposition of HQ South Iraq Area is not clear from available sources.

== Formation ==
- Bikanir Sadul Light Infantry September 1942 to May 1943
- 1st Battalion, Indore Infantry September to December 1942
- 25th Battalion, Sikh Light Infantry May to December 1943
- 26th Battalion, 12th Frontier Force Regiment May 1943 to October 1944
- 28th Battalion, 3rd Madras Regiment December 1943 to October 1944

== See also ==
- List of Indian Army Brigades in World War II
