= 2nd Infantry Division (India) =

Division of the Indian Army

2nd Mountain Division
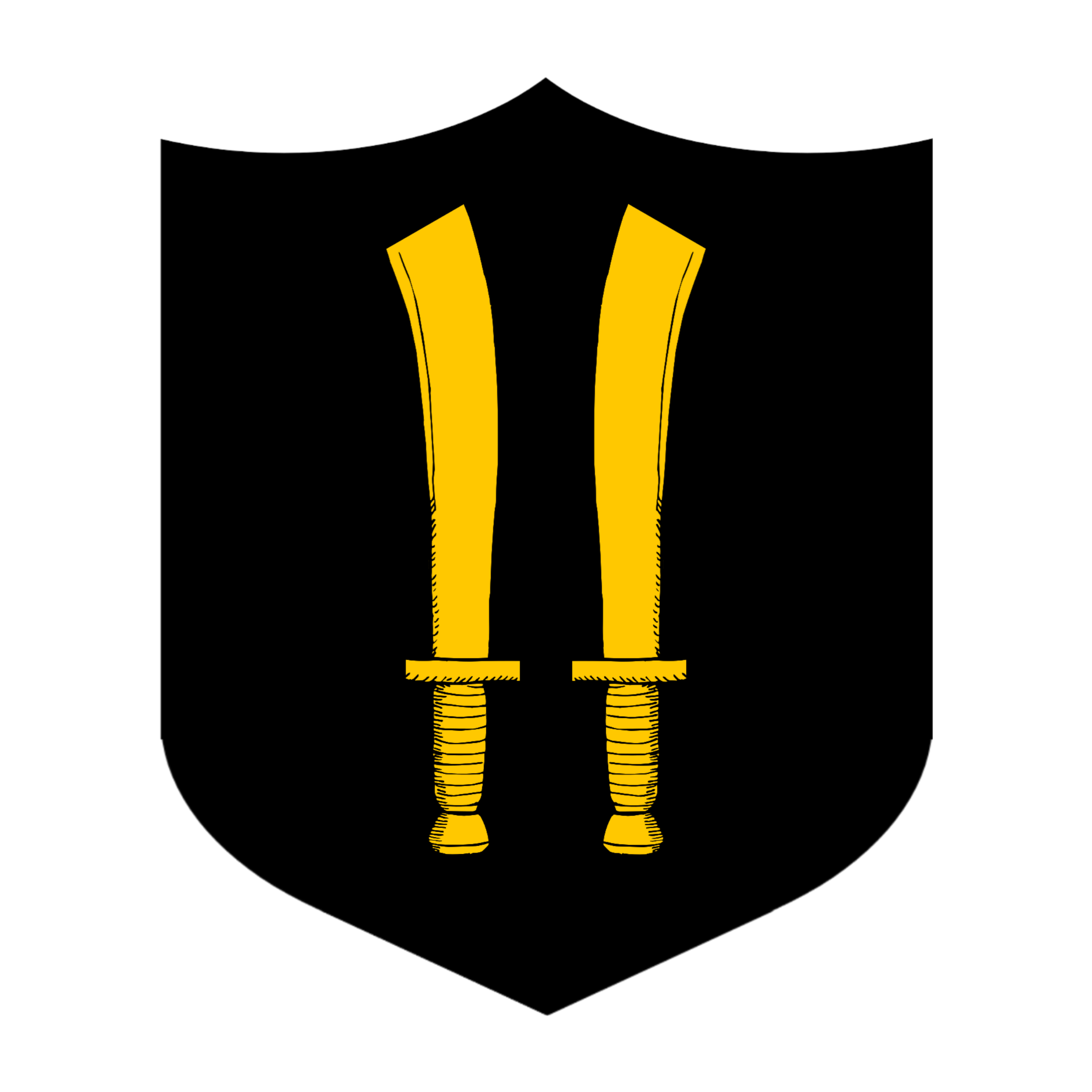
- Insignia of the 2nd Mountain Division
- Active: August 1942 - October 1944; 1962 - date
- Country: British India; India
- Allegiance: British Empire; India
- Branch: British Indian Army; Indian Army
- Type: Infantry
- Role: Mountain warfare, Counterinsurgency
- Size: Division
- Part of: III Corps
- Garrison/HQ: Dinjan
- Nickname: Dao Division
- Engagements: Second World War; Sino-Indian War; Indo-Pakistani War of 1971

Commanders
- Current commander: Maj Gen RS Chandel

The 2nd Division was an infantry division of the Indian Army during World War II and was disbanded in 1944. In its present form, 2 Mountain Division, raised in 1962, is part of the Indian Army.

== World War II ==
The 2nd Division was created for deception purposes in order to control Line of Communications and Sub-area formations within Persia and Iraq Command. It was formed by the re designation of the 30th Indian Infantry Brigade on 15 August 1942. It was later converted to HQ Northern Iraq Area on 15 October 1944.

During the period 1942–44 the division was converted and re-converted from the 31st Indian Infantry Brigade and the 90th Indian Infantry Brigade. 31 Indian Infantry Brigade was formed on 15 January 1943, from the Mosul-Teheran Lines of Communications Sub-Area. It only had two units assigned which were The Central India Horse (21st King George V's Own Horse) and the 2nd Hyderabad Infantry, Indian State Forces. On 15 May 1943 it was reconverted into 2 Indian Division. On 1 June 1943, 31 Indian Infantry Brigade was reformed from HQ Kermanshah LOC Sub-Area. The brigade was disbanded on 14 October 1944.

Thus 2 Indian Division had been reformed on 15 May 1943. Three months later, on 13 August 1943, it was reorganised as 90 Indian Brigade under Lieutenant-Colonel GH Pulling. 90 Indian Brigade served for ten months and then was disbanded in June 1944. Two days later, on 15 August 1943, 2 Indian Division was reformed again by the conversion of 30th Indian Infantry Brigade. This time, the division lasted fourteen months before being finally disbanded in October 1944 by conversion into Headquarters Northern Iraq Area.

One of the division's subordinate LOC areas/brigades was the 40th Indian Infantry Brigade. It was initially raised as Shaiba LOC Sub-Area in September 1942. What higher headquarters it was under at the time is not confirmable from present internet-accessible sources. However, the brigade then came under 2 Indian Division on 1 January 1943. In October 1944, when 2 Indian Division disbanded, the brigade was re-designated again as an lines of communication headquarters, this time as HQ South Iraq Area.

== Post Independence ==
2 Infantry Division was re-raised in the Digboi-Tinsukia area in October 1962 during the Sino-Indian War, following the fall of Tawang. It was placed under IV Corps and was to be responsible for the whole of North-East Frontier Agency, except for Kameng Frontier Division. Major General Mohinder Singh Pathania was its first commander.

== Sino-Indian War ==
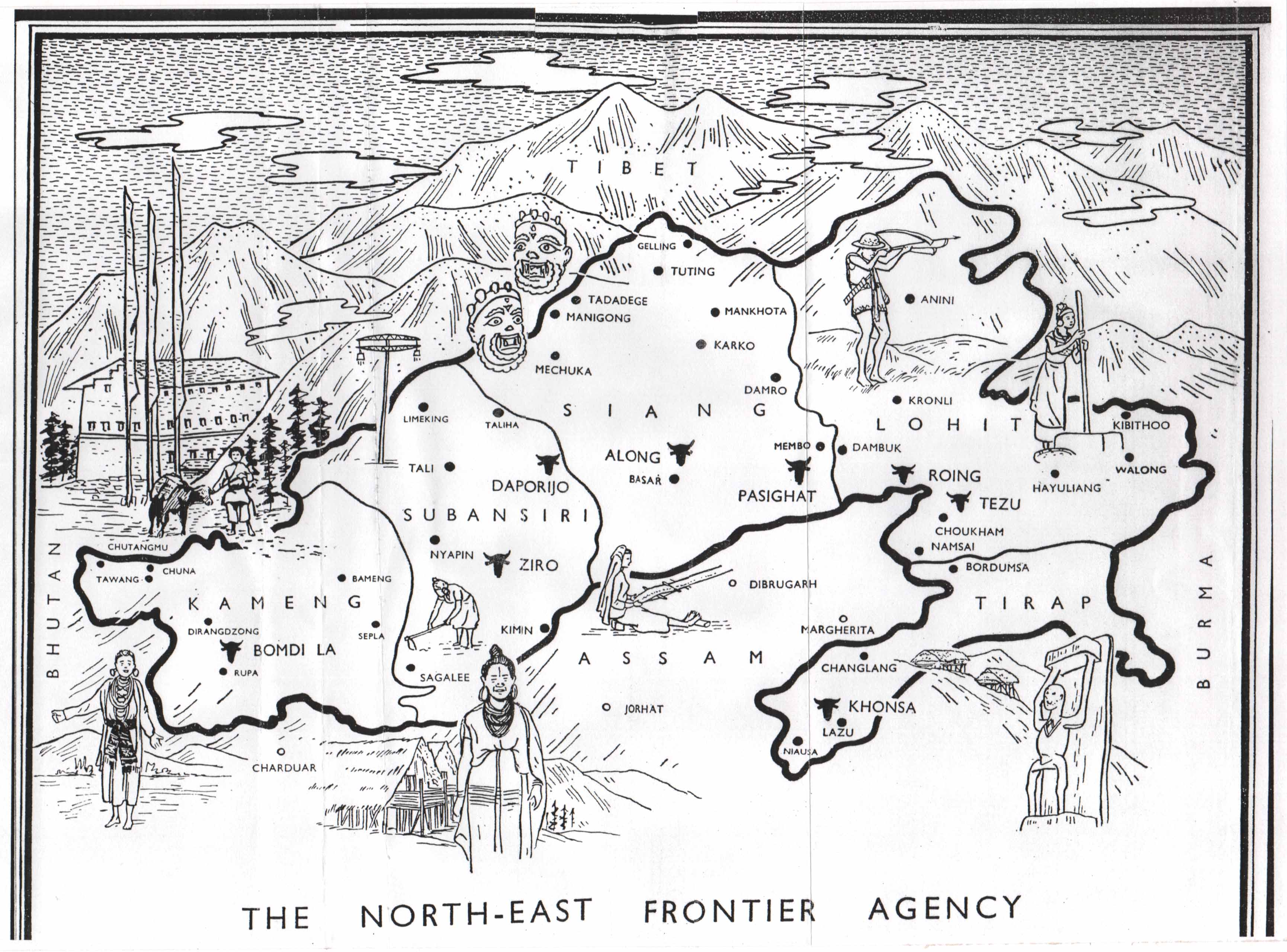
Map of North East Frontier Agency by Verrier Elwin, 1959

Major General MS Pathania arrived at Walong on 26 October 1962 and took command of the newly raised division. 181 Brigade was placed under the division. But, General Pathania preferred to have Brigadier N. C. Rawlley and his 11 Brigade under his command. 11 Brigade was thus moved under 2 Division from Manipur to Lohit Frontier Division and 181 Brigade was moved to the India–Burma border. As of 31 October 1962, the order of battle (ORBAT) for 11 Infantry Brigade was -

- 4 Sikh
- 6 Kumaon
- 4 Dogra
- 3/3 Gorkha Rifles - 1 company
- 2/8 Gorkha Rifles - 2 companies
- 6 Mahar (machine gun) - 1 platoon
- 62 Para Field Battery (17 Parachute Field Regiment) - 1 troop
- 71 Heavy Mortar Battery (44 Heavy Mortar Regiment)
- (2 Assam Rifles operated in this sector during the war)

Following the formation of the division, Subansiri and Siang Frontier Divisions were placed under the operational responsibility of 5 Infantry Brigade. 192 Infantry Brigade was later inducted in this sector and took over the Siang Division on 12 November 1962. The ORBAT of 5 Infantry Brigade as on 18 November 1962 was-

- 1/4 Gorkha Rifles
- 2 Jammu and Kashmir Rifles
- 6 Mahar (machine gun) - 1 platoon
- 69 Heavy Mortar Battery (44 Heavy Mortar Regiment)

The ORBAT of 192 Infantry Brigade as on 16 November 1962 was-

- 2 Madras
- 2/8 Gorkha Rifles - 2 companies
- 6 Mahar (machine gun) - 1 platoon
- 70 Heavy Mortar Battery (44 Heavy Mortar Regiment)
- 11 Assam Rifles

Battle of Walong

On 14 November 1962, 'D Company' of 4 Sikh and two companies of 6 Kumaon carried out the only offensive operation during the war - an attack to capture two tactical features - yellow pimple and green pimple, but were beaten back by the Chinese. During the war, 6 Kumaon lost 2 officer, 6 JCOs and 118 other ranks, 113 were wounded and 172 taken prisoner; 4 Dogra lost one officer, 2 JCOs and 107 other ranks; 4 Sikh lost 2 officer, 4 JCOs and 76 other ranks and had 98 wounded, whereas Delta Company of 3/3 Gorkha Rifles was completely wiped out.

Subansiri and Siang Frontier Divisions

Following the Longju incident in 1959, Subansiri Frontier Division was manned by 9 Assam Rifles and Siang Frontier Division by 11 Assam Rifles. On 27 October 1962, the Chinese ordered the launch of operations towards Limeking (Subansiri Frontier Division), Mechuka and Tuting (both in Siang Frontier Division). An ad hoc force of 2200 troops from different units were earmarked for this offensive. The Chinese carried out preparatory operations between 21 and 30 October to secure positions along the border before the main attack. The main attack was planned for 18 November.

At this time, the Indian deployment was as follows -

- Subansiri Frontier Division
  - North Lakhimpur - Headquarters 5 Brigade
  - Daporijo - two companies of 1/4 Gorkha Rifles
  - Taliha - Headquarters and two companies of 1/4 Gorkha Rifles, two companies of 2 Jammu and Kashmir Rifles, a section of 6 Mahar and 69 Heavy Mortar Battery
  - Limeking - Headquarters and two companies of 2 Jammu and Kashmir Rifles and a section of 6 Mahar
- Siang Frontier Division
  - Along - Headquarters 192 Brigade, two companies of 2/8 Gorkha Rifles, Headquarters and one platoon of 11 Assam Rifles
  - Mechuka Sub Sector - 2/8 Gorkha Rifles less two companies, one company of 2 Madras
  - Tuting Sub Sector - 2 Madras less a company, two platoons 6 Mahar, ten platoons of 11 Assam Rifles
  - Artillery - 70 Heavy Mortar Battery.

The Chinese captured Mechuka on 19 November, Gelling and Limeking on 21 November.

Gallantry awards

- Maha Vir Chakra
  - Sepoy Kewal Singh, 4 Sikh
- Vir Chakra
  - Major Pandharinath Anant Rege, 11 Assam Rifles
  - Captain Prem Nath Bhatia, 6 Kumaon
  - Captain Ravi Kumar Mathur, 6 Kumaon
  - Captain Balbir Chand Chopra, AMC
  - Lieutenant Yog Raj Palta, 4 Sikh
  - Second Lieutenant Amar Singh Khatri, 6 Kumaon
  - Second Lieutenant Pradeep Singh Bhandari, 44 Heavy Mortar Regiment
  - Naik Bahadur Singh, 6 Kumaon
  - Havildar Kirpa Ram, 4 Sikh
  - Subedar Jagandhoy Limbu, 2 Assam Rifles
  - Rifleman Purna Bahadur, 2 Assam Rifles

== Indo-Pakistani War of 1971 ==
2 Mountain Division was part of IV Corps and was commanded by Major General Gandharv Singh Nagra. It was deployed on the Chinese border and hence, most of the division did not take part in the conflict. The exception was 5 Mountain Brigade, which was detached to 101 Communications Zone on 8 September 1971. The brigade consisted of the following units-

- 2 Rajput?
- 2 Dogra
- 2 Garhwal Rifles

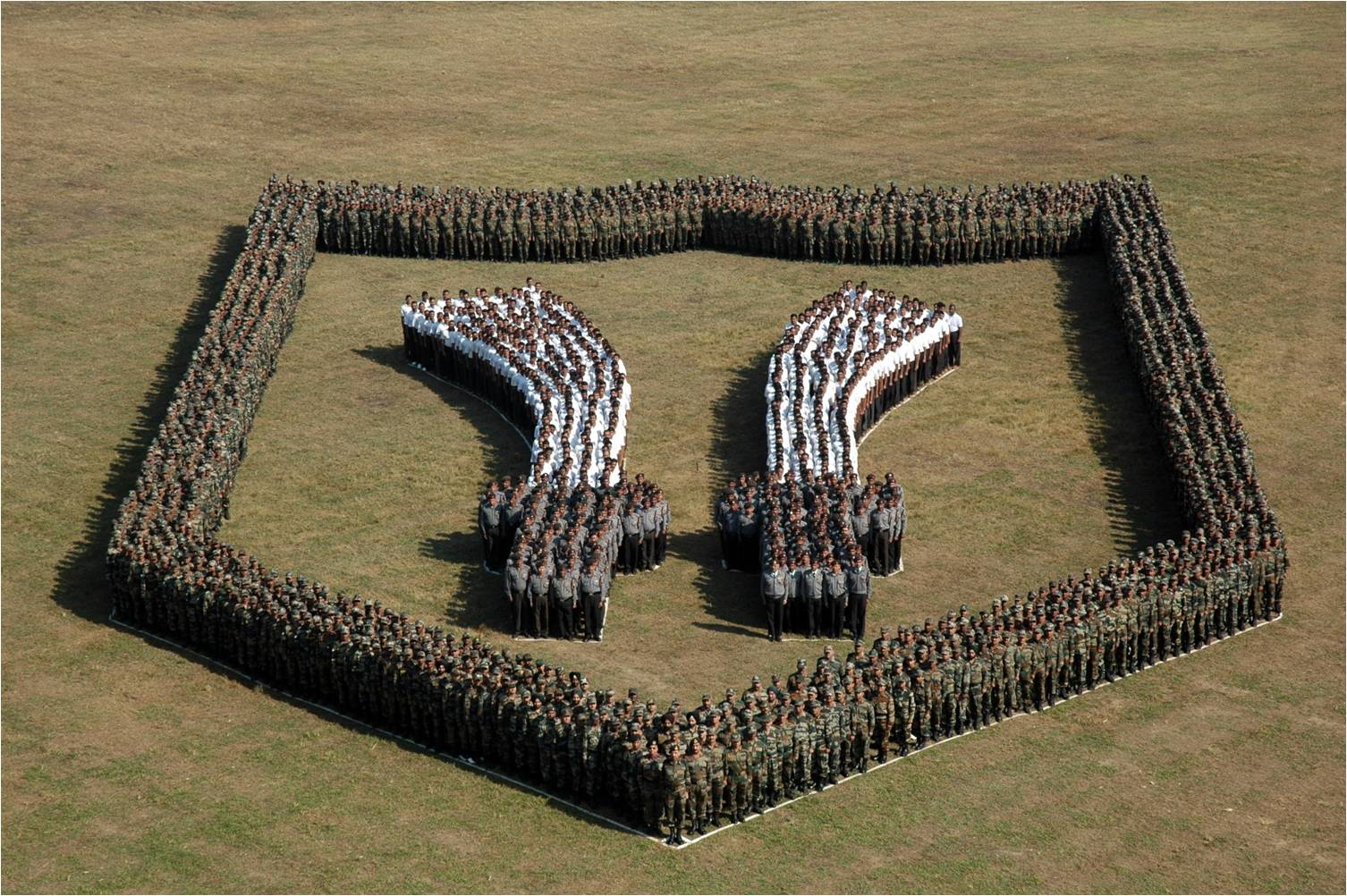
Soldiers portraying the formation sign of 2 Mountain Division (Dao Division)

== The present ==
The division presently covers eastern and upper Assam and eastern Arunachal Pradesh and is responsible for conduct of counter-insurgency operations and the defense of the Indo-China border. The divisional headquarters is at Dinjan in the extreme northeast of Assam. The Division is part of III Corps (Spear Corps), headquartered at Dimapur. It includes the following brigades -

- 5 Mountain Brigade at Aalo (Along) - the oldest infantry brigade in the Indian Army.
- 82 Mountain Brigade at Tezu in Lohit district
- 181 Mountain Brigade at Laipuli, Tinsukia
- 2 Mountain Artillery Brigade at Dinjan
- HQ 25 Sector Assam Rifles, Lekhapani
