= Ralph Deedes =

British Army general (1890–1954)

Lieutenant-General Sir Ralph Deedes KCB OBE MC
- Born: 17 October 1890; Epsom, Surrey, England
- Died: 3 March 1954 (aged 63); Guildford, Surrey, England
- Military career
- Allegiance: United Kingdom
- Branch: Indian Army
- Service years: 1911−1946
- Rank: Lieutenant-General
- Service number: 185407
- Commands: 2nd Battalion, 18th Garhwal Rifles; 2nd Indian Infantry Brigade; Thal Brigade; Waziristan District
- Conflicts: World War I Third Anglo-Afghan War; World War II
- Awards: Knight Commander of the Order of the Bath; Officer of the Order of the British Empire; Military Cross

Lieutenant-General Sir Ralph Bouverie Deedes, KCB, OBE, MC (17 October 1890 − 3 March 1954) was a British Indian Army officer.

== Early life and education ==
Deedes was born on Edgware Road in Epsom, Surrey, the son of Bouverie Deedes and Helen Isabel Deedes. He was educated at Haileybury and the Royal Military College, Sandhurst.

== Military career ==
Deedes was commissioned onto the unattached list of the Indian Army on 29 January 1910 and posted to the 31st Punjabis on 5 March 1911. In 1914 he was attached to the 57th Rifles in France and Belgium, where he served from 5 November 1914 to 25 September 1915. He also served in Mesopotamia 18 April to 11 July 1916. He was awarded the Military Cross in the London Gazette of 14 January 1916 for his actions in France & Belgium.

From 27 April to 7 October 1918 he was a Deputy Assistant Military Secretary to the Commander in Chief, India and from 27 January 1919 to 1 January 1922 he was an Assistant Military Secretary to the Commander in Chief, India and for his service during the operations against Afghanistan in 1919 he was made an Officer of the Order of the British Empire.

He was appointed a Company Commander in the 2nd battalion 16th Punjab Regiment (the post 1922 title of the 31st Punjabis) on 24 November 1924. He attended the Staff College, Camberley from 1925 to 1926. He was Brigade Major 11th (Ahmednagar) Brigade from 2 September 1930 to 24 September 1931.

He served as commanding officer of 2nd battalion of the 18th Garhwal Rifles from February 1934 to October 1937 and went on to become Acting Commander of 2nd Indian Infantry Brigade from April to October 1936 and Deputy Military Secretary in India in October 1937.

Deedes served in World War II as commander of the Thal Brigade from October 1939, as General Officer Commanding Waziristan District from 12 March 1941. He was Mentioned in Dispatches for Waziristan in 1942 (London Gazette 17/12/42) and 1943 (London Gazette 25/11/43) and was appointed CB in London Gazette 11 June 1942. He was appointed Military Secretary in India 21 August 1943. He was appointed Colonel of the 18th Garhwal Rifles 1 December 1944, and was advanced to KCB in the London Gazette 14 June 1945. His last appointment was as Adjutant-General, India from 1944 until 15 March 1946 before retiring 15 November 1946.

== Bibliography ==
- Smart, Nick (2005). Biographical Dictionary of British Generals of the Second World War. Barnesley: Pen & Sword. ISBN 1844150496.

Military offices
Preceded by Sir William Baker	Adjutant-General, India; 1944−1946	Succeeded by Sir Reginald Savory
