= 75th Armoured Regiment (India) =

Indian Army regiment

75 Armoured Regiment
- Active: 1972 – present
- Country: India
- Allegiance: India
- Branch: Indian Army
- Type: Armoured Corps
- Size: Regiment
- Mottos: साहसं विजयते “Sahasam Vijayate (Courage Wins)”
- Colors: "Canary Yellow over Bottle Green"
- Equipment: MBT Arjun
- Battle honours: Theatre Honour ‘Sindh’

Commanders
- Colonel of the Regiment: Lieutenant General Vivek Kashyap
- Notable commanders: Lieutenant General Vijai Singh

Insignia
- Abbreviation: 75 Armd Regt

75 Armoured Regiment is an armoured regiment of the Indian Army.

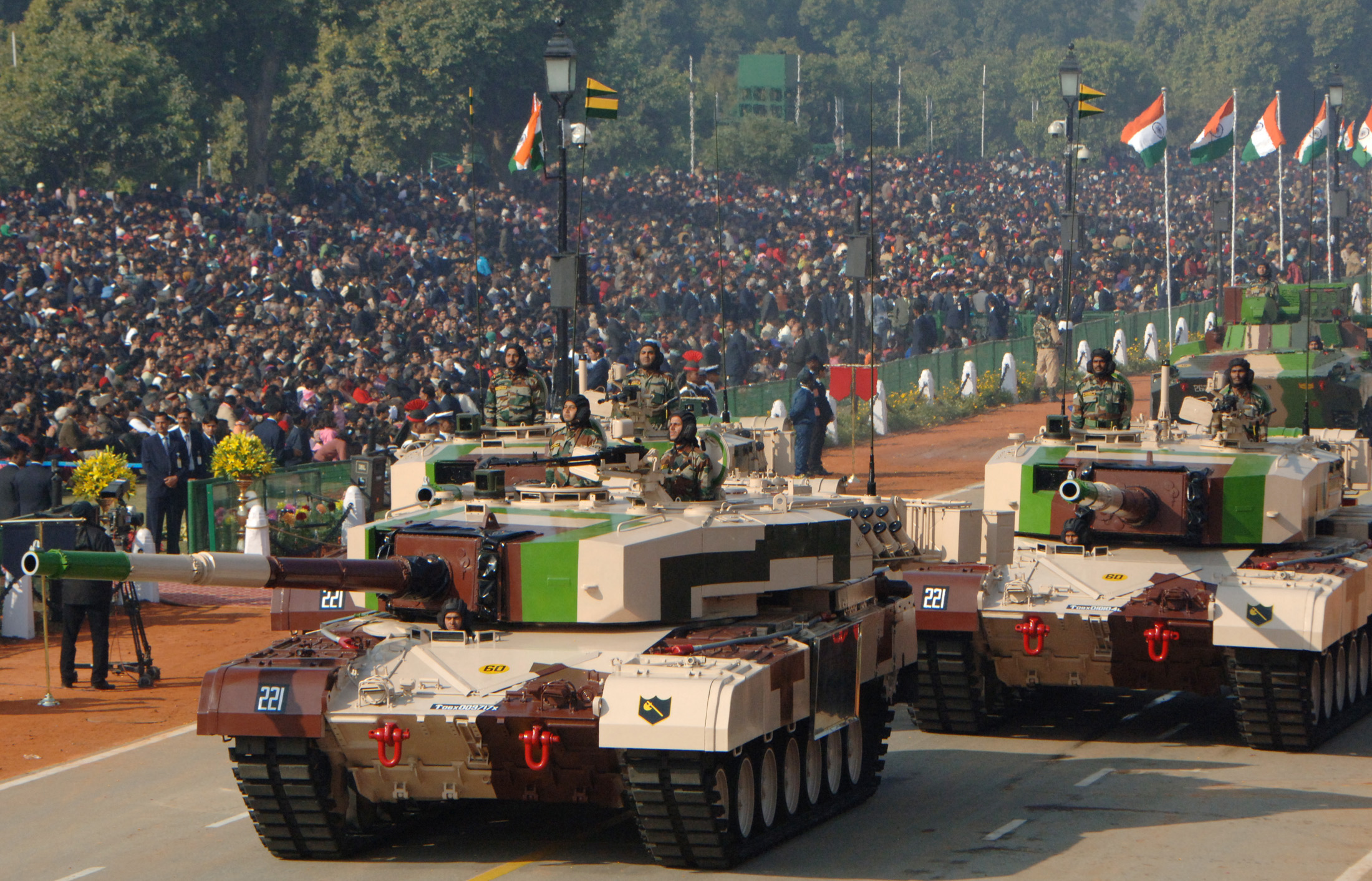
MBT Arjun of 75 Armoured Regiment at Republic Day Parade 2013

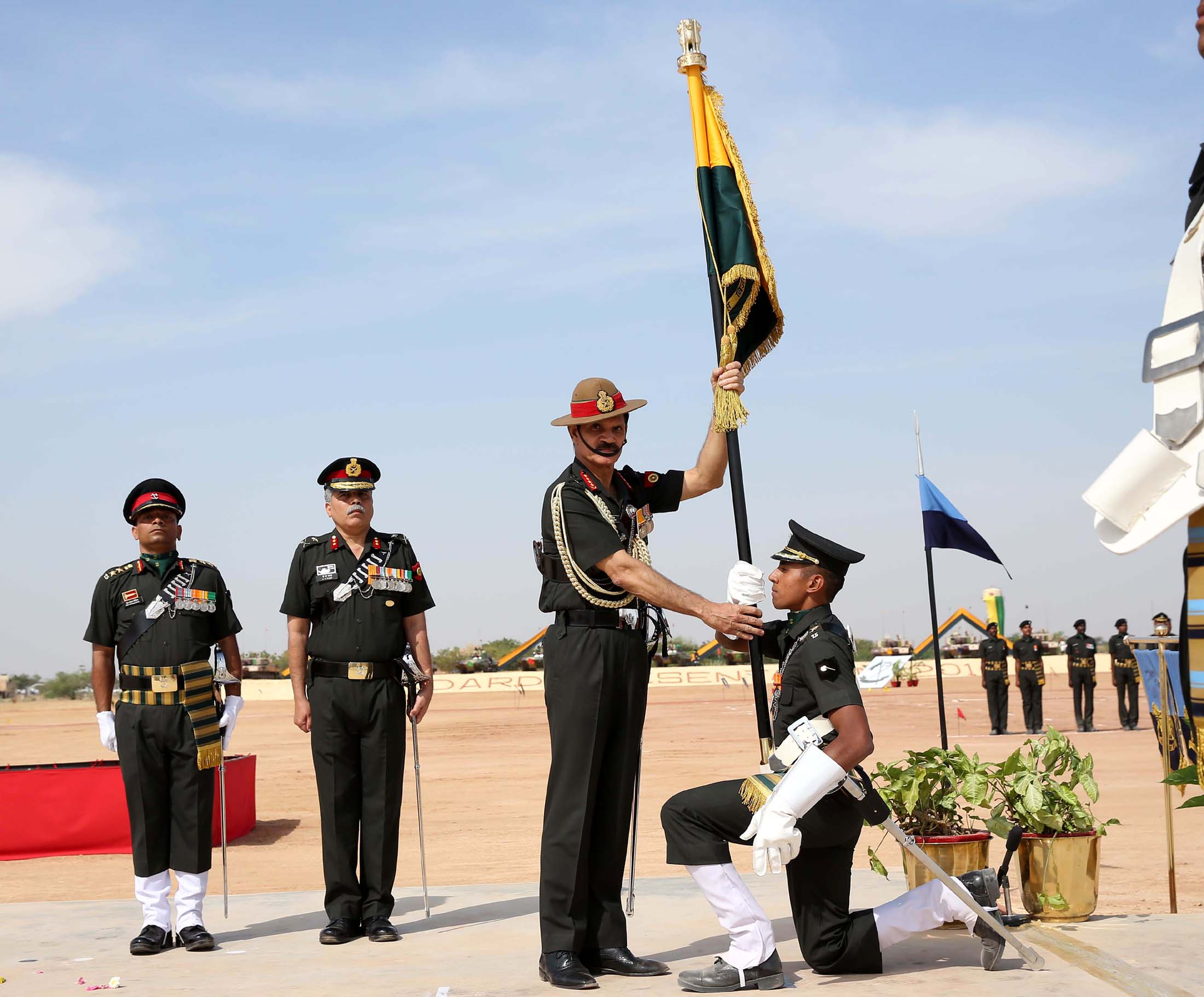
The Chief of Army Staff, General Dalbir Singh presenting the President's ‘Standard’ to 75 Armored Regiment, at Jaisalmer Military Station, in Rajasthan on March 16, 2016

== Formation ==
75 Armoured Regiment was raised on 12 March 1972 under the command of Lt Col (later Lt Gen) Vijai Singh. It has a unique distinction of being the only unit of the Indian Army to be raised on captured Pakistani Territory in Sakna, Sindh; which is 26 kilometres inside Pakistan.

The Regiment was formed by an amalgamation of three Independent Armoured Squadrons - 3 (Independent) Armoured Squadron (Skinner's Horse), 4 (Independent) Armoured Squadron (Deccan Horse) and 6 (Independent) Armoured Squadron.

The Regiment is a part of 140 Armoured Brigade, 12 Infantry Division, XII Corps.

== History ==
4 (Independent) Armoured Squadron took part in the Indo-Pakistani War of 1965 as part of the 67 Infantry Brigade Group under XI Corps and in the Indo-Pakistani War of 1971 as part of F Sector under XI Corps, whereas 3 and 6 (Independent) Armoured Squadrons saw combat in the Indo-Pakistani War of 1971.

During the Indo-Pakistani War of 1971, the Regiment had the honour of carrying out the deepest ground penetration in the Western Front. 3 (Independent) Armoured Squadron penetrated till Naya Chor in Sindh. 6 (Independent) Armoured Squadron fought in the Battle of BP 638 (immediately following the Battle of Longewala). The attack by the squadron forced the troops of the Pakistani 18th Infantry Division to pull back across the International Border. 4 (Independent) Armoured Squadron fought in the Fazilka sector. The Regiment returned to India in 1972 with 2 Vir Chakras, 2 Sena Medals, 3 Mention in Despatches and a Theatre honour.

The Regiment was presented the ‘President’s Standards’ at Jaisalmer in 2016 by General Dalbir Singh, Chief of the Army Staff, on behalf of the President of India, Mr Pranab Mukherjee.

The Regiment which had the T-55 tanks since its inception was inducted with the MBT Arjun in 2011. The tanks of the 75 Armoured Regiment took part in the 2013, 2022 and 2023 Republic Day Parades.

Other operations

The regiment has also participated in Operation Vijay, Operation Rakshak and Operation Parakram.

== Regimental Insignia ==
The Regimental insignia consists of crossed lances with pennons of Canary Yellow over Bottle Green, the numeral "75" inscribed on the crossing of the lances and a scroll at the base with the regimental motto (Sahasam Vijayate) inscribed in Devanagari script on it. The shoulder title consists of the numeral "75" in brass.
