= XXXIV Corps (British India) =

Corps in British Indian army

The Indian XXXIV Corps was formed in March 1945 to be part of the British Fourteenth Army for Operation Zipper, the invasion of British Malaya. Significant formations under Fourteenth Army for 'Zipper,' possibly under XXXIV Corps, included 5th Indian Division, 23rd Indian Division, 25th Indian Infantry Division, and 26th Indian Infantry Division.

Since Japan surrendered before the operation could be executed, the corps, under the command of Lieutenant-General Ouvry Roberts, did not see wartime service. It did, however, see occupation duty after the conflict was over.

XXXIV Corps was still active in September 1945 in Malaya, with HQ 2nd British Infantry Division, 25th Indian Division, 50th Indian Tank Brigade, and 150th Indian Infantry Brigade, which was en route to Hong Kong.
