= 12th Infantry Division (India) =

12th Indian Infantry Division
- Active: 1943–1945; 1966–Present
- Country: British India; India
- Branch: British Indian Army; Indian Army
- Size: Division
- Nickname(s): "Battle Axe Division"
- Engagements: World War II

Commanders
- Notable commanders: J.F.R. Jacob

The 12th RAPID Division is a division of the Indian Army. It was formed during World War II in January 1943, in Persia. It was renamed South Persia Area in January 1945. During the war it had 34th Indian Infantry Brigade, 39th Indian Infantry Brigade, and 60th Indian Infantry Brigade under command.

The division was formed again on 3 November 1966 from forces in the Barmer sector of the border with Pakistan. In December 1971 the 12th was under Southern Command, with the 30th, 45th and 322nd Infantry Brigades. In 2004, the Arjun MBT entered service with 140th Armoured Brigade, 12th RAPID Division in Jaisalmer. The two Arjun units have been reported as the 43 Armoured Regiment (Jaisalmer) and 75 Armoured Regiment (Jaisalmer).
