= Reginald Savory =

British Indian Army officer during World War I and World War II

Lieutenant-General Sir Reginald Savory KCIE CB DSO MC DL
- Lieutenant-General Sir Reginald Savory in 1948
- Born: 26 July 1894; London, England
- Died: 14 June 1980 (aged 85); Farnham, Surrey, England
- Military career
- Allegiance: United Kingdom
- Branch: British Indian Army
- Service years: 1914–1948
- Rank: Lieutenant-General
- Nicknames: "Reg" "Reggie"
- Service number: 152412
- Unit: 11th Sikh Regiment
- Commands: 1st Battalion, 11th Sikh Regiment (1937–39); 11th Indian Infantry Brigade (1940–1941); 23rd Indian Division (1942–1943)
- Conflicts: World War I Russian Civil War; World War II
- Awards: KCIE (31 December 1946); CB (January 1944); Distinguished Service Order (1941); Military Cross (2 June 1916); Mentioned in despatches (December 1941, December 1943)
- Other work: Deputy Lord Lieutenant of the County of Somerset (12 June 1952); Commissioner Indian Military Service Family Pension Fund

Lieutenant-General Sir Reginald Arthur Savory KCIE CB DSO MC DL (26 July 1894 − 14 June 1980) was a British Indian Army officer who served during both World War I and World War II.

== Military career ==
Educated at Uppingham School, he then attended the Royal Military College, Sandhurst. Savory was commissioned onto the Unattached List of the Indian Army and posted to the 14th Sikhs in 1914. He served in World War I initially in Egypt and then took part in the Gallipoli campaign and then the Mesopotamian campaign. Promoted to lieutenant on 14 April 1916, he was awarded the Military Cross in June 1916.

After the War Savory became Staff Captain with the British Military Mission to Vladivostok during the Russian Civil War. He attended the Staff College, Camberley from 1927 to 1928.

He went on to be an instructor at the Army School of Education in India in 1925 and an instructor at the Indian Military Academy in 1932 and was appointed commanding officer of the 1st Battalion, 11th Sikh Regiment in 1937 (with promotion to lieutenant colonel on 6 December 1937).

Savory initially served in World War II as Assistant Quartermaster-General for 5th Indian Division from 1939 (with promotion to colonel on 21 September 1939). He went on to be commander of the 11th Indian Infantry Brigade, part of the 4th Indian Infantry Division, which was deployed in the Western Desert on various operations including Operation Compass from 1940 (with promotion to the temporary rank of brigadier on 2 April 1940).

In early 1941 Savory took his brigade, part of 4th Indian Infantry Division, to Sudan and fought in the East African campaign. After the Battle of Keren the brigade returned to the campaign in the Western Desert, taking part in Operation Battleaxe. Savory relinquished command of the brigade in September 1941 to serve as General Officer Commanding (GOC) Eritrea in the acting rank of major-general. In January 1942 he was given command of 23rd Indian Division in Burma and in 1943 was appointed as Director of Infantry for India (with permanent promotion to major-general on 24 October 1943). In 1945 he became General Officer Commanding Iraq.

After the War Savory became Adjutant-General, India (with promotion to acting lieutenant-general on 15 March 1946), and was appointed Knight Commander of the Order of the Indian Empire on 1 January 1947, before retiring in May 1948. After retirement, but when he was still on the Reserve List, his acting rank of lieutenant-general was in November 1949 made substantive with seniority backdated to September 1947.

Savory was also colonel of the Sikh Light Infantry. In retirement he wrote the book His Britannic Majesty's Army in Germany During the Seven Years' War (Clarendon Press, Oxford, 1966). He was also a deputy lieutenant of Somerset and was a justice of the peace.

== Bibliography ==
- Mackenzie, Compton (1951). Eastern Epic. Chatto & Windus, London. pp. 623 pages.
- Mead, Richard (2007). Churchill's Lions: a biographical guide to the key British generals of World War II. Stroud (UK): Spellmount. ISBN 978-1-86227-431-0.
- Smart, Nick (2005). Biographical Dictionary of British Generals of the Second World War. Barnesley: Pen & Sword. ISBN 1844150496.

Military offices
Preceded by New post	GOC 23rd Indian Infantry Division; 1942–1943	Succeeded by Ouvry Lindfield Roberts
Preceded by Sir Ralph Deedes	Adjutant-General, India; 1946–1947	Succeeded by Hira Lal Atal
