= 39th Indian Infantry Brigade =

- Active: 1942–1945
- Country: British India
- Branch: British Indian Army
- Part of: 12th Indian Infantry Division

The 39th Indian Infantry Brigade was an infantry formation of the Indian Army during World War II. It was formed in September 1942, by the conversion of the HQ Ahwaz Line of Communications Sub-Area. The brigade served on Lines of Communication duties in Persia with the 12th Indian Infantry Division.

== Formation ==
- Bikanir Sadul Light Infantry May 1943 to October 1944
- 75th Cavalry Garrison Regiment, Indian Armoured Corps July 1943 to January 1945
- 1st Duke of York's Own Skinner's Horse August to December 1943
- 21st King George V's Own Horse August to December 1943
- The Afridi Battalion January 1944 to January 1945
- 2nd Battalion, 6th Rajputana Rifles January to March 1944
- 25th Battalion, Sikh Light Infantry March 1944 to January 1945
- Jodhpur Sardar Risala May 1944 to January 1945

== See also ==
- List of Indian Army Brigades in World War II
