= 60th Indian Infantry Brigade =

- Active: 1943–1945
- Country: British India
- Allegiance: British Crown
- Branch: British Indian Army
- Part of: 12th Indian Infantry Division

Commanders
- Notable commanders: Brigadier F W McCallum; Lieutenant Colonel R K Henson; Brigadier R L Goode

The 60th Indian Infantry Brigade was an Infantry formation of the Indian Army during World War II. It was formed in July 1943, by the re designation of the 10th Indian Motor Brigade. The brigade served in Lebanon, Iraq and Persia with the 12th Indian Infantry Division.

== Formation ==
- 1st Duke of Yorks Own Skinners Horse July to August 1943
- 21st King George V's Own Horse July to August 1943
- 3rd Battalion, 11th Sikh Regiment July 1943 to May 1944 and August 1944 to April 1945
- 4th Battalion, 8th Punjab Regiment July to August 1943 and June 1945
- 5th Battalion, 13th Frontier Force Rifles July 1943 to March 1945
- 1st Battalion, Kotah Umed Infantry, Indian State Forces September 1944 to August 1945
- 17th Battalion, 10th Baluch Regiment September 1944 to August 1945
- 2nd Battalion, Hydrabad Infantry (ISF) January to August 1945
- 75th Cavalry Garrison Regiment, Indian Armoured Corps January to June 1945
- 14th Battalion, 12th Frontier Force Regiment March to August 1945
- Jodhpur Sardar Risala (ISF) June to August 1945
- 2nd Battalion, 6th Rajputana Rifles

== See also ==
- List of Indian Army Brigades in World War II
