= 150th Indian Infantry Brigade =

- Active: 1943–1945
- Country: British India
- Branch: British Indian Army
- Size: Brigade
- Engagements: World War II

Commanders
- Notable commanders: Brigadier P L Lindsay

The 150th Indian Infantry Brigade was an Infantry formation of the Indian Army during World War II. The brigade was formed in March 1944, at Secunderabad as a Jungle Training Brigade assigned to the Southern Army.

In September 1945 the brigade was part of XXXIV Corps (India), en route to Hong Kong.

== Formation ==
- 2nd Battalion, Assam Regiment March 1944 to July 1945
- 9th Battalion, 8th Punjab Regiment May 1944 to July 1944
- 1st Battalion, East Yorkshire Regiment July 1944 to March 1945
- 6th Battalion, 7th Rajput Regiment August to December 1944
- 8th Battalion, 8th Punjab Regiment September 1944 to June 1945
- 7th Battalion, King's Own Royal Regiment (Lancaster) October 1944 to February 1945
- 2nd Battalion, King's Own Yorkshire Light Infantry April to August 1945
- 8th Battalion, 14th Punjab Regiment July to August 1945
- 9th Battalion, York and Lancaster Regiment July to August 1945

== See also ==
- List of Indian Army Brigades in World War II
