= Landi Kotal Brigade =

- Active: 1920–1945
- Country: British India
- Allegiance: British Crown
- Branch: British Indian Army

Commanders
- Notable commanders: Brigadier A. L. M. Molesworth; Brigadier H. T. D. Hickman; Brigadier E. N. Goddard

The Landi Kotal Brigade was an infantry formation of the Indian Army during World War II. It was formed in 1920, for service on the North West Frontier. It was normal practice for newly formed battalions to be posted to the North West Frontier for service before being sent to Africa, Burma or Italy.

== Formation (during World War Two) ==
- 1st South Wales Borderers September to December 1939
- 1/1st Punjab Regiment September 1939 to December 1940
- 2/5th Gurkha Rifles September 1939 to February 1940
- 3/9th Jat Regiment September to October 1939
- 4/11th Sikh Regiment September to October 1939
- 4/15th Punjab Regiment September 1939 to March 1941
- 2/12th Frontier Force Regiment October 1939 to October 1940
- 2/9th Gurkha Rifles November 1939 to March 1941
- 6/11th Sikh Regiment October 1940 to February 1942
- 1st Bahawalpur Infantry November 1940 to March 1941
- 2/19th Hyderabad Regiment November 1940 to November 1941
- 5/12th Frontier Force Regiment December 1940 to April 1941
- 3/6th Gurkha Rifles March 1941 to March 1943
- 5/10th Baluch Regiment April 1941 to January 1942
- 6/19th Hyderabad Regiment April 1941 to October 1942
- 8/8th Punjab Regiment October 1941 to January 1942
- 7/12th Frontier Force Regiment November 1941 to March 1943
- 8/11th Sikh Regiment December 1941 to February 1942
- 7/17th Dogra Regiment January to March 1942
- 2/2nd Punjab Regiment January to March 1942
- 4/18th Royal Garhwal Rifles March to August 1942
- 4th Jammu and Kashmir Infantry March to May 1942
- 6/18th Royal Garhwal Rifles June 1942 to September 1944
- 16/5th Mahratta Light Infantry August 1942 to August 1943
- 9/1st Punjab Regiment October 1942 to March 1943
- 15/7th Rajput Regiment November 1942 to September 1944
- Purnao Gorakh Regiment, Nepal December 1942 to August 1943
- 2nd Jammu and Kashmir Rifles March 1943 to August 1944
- 3/1st Gurkha Rifles April to July 1943
- 8/15th Punjab Regiment May 1943 to April 1944
- 6/8th Punjab Regiment August 1943 to September 1944
- Bairab Nath Regiment, Nepal August 1943 to August 1945
- 5/15th Punjab Regiment February to November 1944
- 9/10th Baluch Regiment March to November 1944
- 15/6th Rajputana Rifles July to October 1944
- 2nd Patiala Infantry September 1944 to March 1945
- 16/7th Rajput Regiment September 1944 to August 1945
- 14/9th Jat Regiment November 1944 to January 1945
- 16/15th Punjab Regiment November 1944 to August 1945
- 16/5th Mahratta Light Infantry March to August 1945
- Kholapur Rajaram Rifles march to August 1945
- 426th Field Company, Indian Engineers June 1942 to June 1943
- 25th Field Company, Indian Engineers June 1943 to August 1945

== See also ==
- List of Indian Army Brigades in World War II
