= Thal Brigade =

- Active: 1938–1945
- Country: British India
- Allegiance: British Crown
- Branch: British Indian Army
- Size: Brigade

Commanders
- Notable commanders: Brigadier MLA Gompertz; Brigadier Ralph Deedes

The Thal Brigade was an Infantry formation of the Indian Army during World War II. It was formed in November 1938, for service on the North West Frontier. It was normal practice for newly formed battalions to be posted to the North West Frontier for service before being sent to Africa, Burma or Italy.

== Formation ==
These units served in the brigade during World War II

- 1/13th Frontier Force Rifles
- 2/15th Punjab Regiment
- 1/17th Dogra Regiment
- 1/5th Mahratta Light Infantry
- 4th Jammu and Kashmir Infantry
- 1/7th Gurkha Rifles
- Shamsher Dal Regiment, Nepal
- 2/6th Rajputana Rifles
- 6/10th Baluch Regiment
- 1/7th Gurkha Rifles
- 2nd Worcestershire Regiment
- 6/17th Dogra Regiment
- 2nd Patiala Infantry
- 7th Jammu and Kashmir Infantry
- 7/13th Frontier Force Rifles
- 8/9th Jat Regiment
- 9th Jammu and Kashmir Infantry
- Bairab Nath Regiment, Nepal
- Purnao Gorakh Regiment, Nepal
- 7/3rd Madras Regiment
- 14/7th Rajput Regiment
- 3/3rd Madras Regiment

== See also ==
- List of Indian Army Brigades in World War II
