= Lewis Heath =

British Indian Army general (1885–1954)

Sir Lewis Heath KBE CB CIE DSO MC
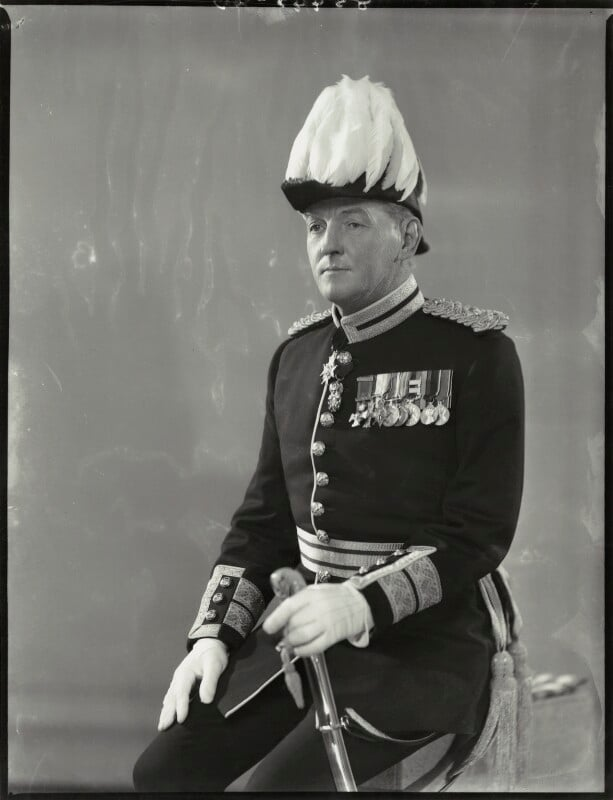
- Heath in 1939
- Born: Lewis Macclesfield Heath; 23 November 1885; India
- Died: 10 January 1954 (aged 68); Bath, Somerset, England
- Military career
- Allegiance: United Kingdom
- Branch: British Indian Army
- Service years: 1905–1946
- Rank: Lieutenant-General
- Nickname: "Piggy"
- Service number: 93958
- Commands: III Indian Corps (1941–1942); 5th Indian Division (1940–1941); Deccan District (1939–1940); Wana Brigade (1936–1939); 1st Battalion, 11th Sikh Regiment (1929–1933); Seistan Levy Corps (1919–1921)
- Conflicts: First World War; Third Anglo-Afghan War; North-West Frontier; Second World War; East African Campaign; Battle of Malaya; Battle of Singapore
- Awards: Knight Commander of the Order of the British Empire; Companion of the Order of the Bath; Companion of the Order of the Indian Empire; Distinguished Service Order; Military Cross; Mentioned in Despatches (3)

Lieutenant-General Sir Lewis Macclesfield Heath, KBE, CB, CIE, DSO, MC (23 November 1885 – 10 January 1954) was an officer in the British Indian Army during the early to mid-twentieth century.

== Early life and family ==
Heath was born 23 November 1885, the son of Col. Lewis Forbes Heath of the British Indian Army. He was educated at Wellington College and Royal Military Academy Sandhurst. He joined the British Indian Army in 1905.

In 1915, Heath married Marjorie, daughter of Brigadier General A. B. H. Drew, and had three sons and two daughters. In 1941, he remarried Kathleen Longeron of Auckland and had another son.

== Military service ==
Heath joined the Indian Army on 18 January 1905 and served with the King's African Rifles from 1909 to 1913. He was promoted to captain on 18 January 1914. He saw action in the First World War where he was injured losing an eye and suffering permanent damage to his left arm. He was subsequently awarded the Military Cross. Following the war he fought in the Third Anglo-Afghan War and served in East Persia from 1919 to 1921. He was Deputy Assistant Adjutant and Quartermaster General in India and Afghanistan between 30 May 1919 and 8 August 1919, and Deputy-Assistant Adjutant-General between 9 August 1919 and 26 September 1919. On 18 January 1920, he was promoted to major. Between 1919 and 1921 he was Commandant of the Seistan Levy Corps. Between 21 November 1924 and 5 July 1928 Heath served as Assistant Commandant and Commandant Indian Wing, at the Army School of Education, India. He transferred to the 10/14 Punjab Regiment in 1928. He became commanding officer of the 1st Battalion, 11th Sikh Regiment in 1929 and was deployed to the North-West Frontier in India in 1930 and 1932. On 1 January 1929 Heath was promoted to battalion lieutenant colonel and then lieutenant colonel on 6 December 1929. On 6 May 1932, Heath was promoted to battalion colonel. He received the Distinguished Service Order (DSO) on 8 September 1933 and was promoted to colonel on 9 January 1934. He became an instructor at the Senior Officers School, Belgaum, India in 1934 and Brigade Commander, Wana Brigade in 1936, in which capacity he was deployed to the North West Frontier in 1937. In 1939, Heath was awarded the Order of the Bath on 2 January 1939 and promoted to Major General on 20 January of the same year. He went on to be Commander 7th Indian Division of the Deccan District in 1939.

Heath achieved success as the General Officer Commanding the 5th Indian Infantry Division during the East African Campaign. Heath was appointed lieutenant general on 10 May 1941 and was awarded the Order of the British Empire (KBE) on 30 May 1941. He was appointed to command III Indian Corps on 26 April 1941 as part of the Malaya Command, which then participated in the Battle of Malaya. He was unable to stop the Japanese advance and had conflicting opinions on how to conduct the campaign with his commanding officer, Lieutenant General Arthur Percival. He was captured during the Battle of Singapore, and held in prison in Singapore, Formosa, and Manchukuo (Manchuria) between 1942 and 1945. He retired on 13 April 1946 with the rank of lieutenant general.

== Bibliography ==
- Mead, Richard (2007). Churchill's Lions: A Biographical Guide to the Key British Generals of World War II. Stroud: Spellmount. ISBN 978-1-86227-431-0.
- Smart, Nick (2005). Biographical Dictionary of British Generals of the Second World War. Barnesley: Pen & Sword. ISBN 1844150496.

Military offices
| New command | GOC 5th Indian Infantry Division; 1939–1941 | Succeeded by Mosley Mayne |
