= William Baker (Indian Army officer) =

British Indian Army general (1888–1964)

Lieutenant-General Sir William Baker KCIE CB DSO OBE
- Born: 7 December 1888; Christchurch, New Zealand
- Died: 28 December 1964 (aged 76); Devon, England
- Military career
- Allegiance: United Kingdom
- Branch: British Indian Army
- Service years: 1909−1944
- Rank: Lieutenant-General
- Service number: 1430
- Unit: 31st Duke of Connaught's Own Lancers
- Commands: Probyn's Horse; Delhi Brigade Area; Kohat Brigade; Tochi Column
- Conflicts: World War I Third Anglo-Afghan War; World War II
- Awards: Knight Commander of the Order of the Indian Empire; Companion of the Order of the Bath; Distinguished Service Order; Officer of the Order of the British Empire; Mentioned in dispatches (4)

Lieutenant-General Sir William Henry Goldney Baker KCIE CB DSO OBE (7 December 1888 – 28 December 1964) was a British officer who served in the British Indian Army. Commissioned into the Indian Army in 1910, he served in France during World War I with the 34th Poona Horse and later the Cheshire Regiment, of which he was temporary commander of the 1st Battalion. Baker was mentioned in dispatches three times and awarded the Distinguished Service Order. In 1918 he fought the Marris in India with the 31st Duke of Connaught's Own Lancers. He then held a series of staff officer positions after the war before being promoted to lieutenant-colonel and receiving command of Probyn's Horse in 1935. He was promoted to the temporary rank of brigadier and commanded troops in action in Waziristan in 1936 and 1937, being again mentioned in dispatches. During World War II Baker was an aide-de-camp to King George VI and was promoted to the rank of lieutenant-general before retiring from military service in 1944.

== Early life and military career ==
Born the son of the Reverend H. G. Baker of Budleigh Salterton, Baker was educated at Christ's College, Christchurch and, in England, at Bedford School, and then attended the Royal Military College, Sandhurst where he passed out first in his class. He was commissioned to the unattached List of the Indian Army on 20 January 1909 and posted to the 31st Duke of Connaught's Own Lancers on 29 March 1910 and was promoted to lieutenant on 20 April 1911.

Baker saw service in World War I. He was deployed to France on 13 March 1915 and became attached to the 34th Poona Horse on 31 May 1915. Promoted to temporary captain in the Cheshire Regiment on 21 September 1915 and to major in that regiment on 15 May 1916, he was promoted to the substantive rank of captain on 1 September 1915.

Baker was promoted to acting lieutenant-colonel on appointment as acting commanding officer of the 1st battalion of the Cheshire Regiment on 22 August 1916 and awarded the DSO. He was also mentioned in despatches three times. He was promoted to brevet major on 1 January 1918 and to acting major in the Indian Army on 3 February 1918 while temporary second in command of the 31st Duke of Connaught's Own Lancers. He took part in the operations against the Marris between 18 February to 8 April 1918.

== Between the wars ==
Baker took part in the Third Anglo-Afghan War in 1919 and was mentioned in despatches. Later in 1919 he was appointed an Instructor at the Cavalry School at Saugor before attending the Staff College, Quetta from 1921 to 1922. He became a General Staff Officer Grade 2 (GSO2), on the General Staff at Southern Command on 24 August 1922 shortly before the 31st Duke of Connaught's Own Lancers and 32nd Lancers were amalgamated in 1923 to form the 13th Duke of Connaught’s Own Lancers. He became a GSO2 with the Australian Military Forces on 1 January 1924 and was attached to the Department of the Chief of the General Staff in Australia.

Promoted to the substantive rank of major on 20 January 1925, he was appointed Squadron commander with the 13th Duke of Connaught’s Own Lancers on 1 October 1928. He became a General Staff Officer 2nd grade at the Directorate of Staff Duties on 1 November 1929 and was promoted to brevet lieutenant-colonel on 1 July 1930. He transferred to Probyn's Horse on 30 July 1933 as second in command and attended the Senior Officers Course at Sheerness in 1934. Promoted to the substantive rank of lieutenant-colonel on 20 January 1935, he attended a course at the Imperial Defence College in 1936. He became commanding officer (CO) of Probyn's Horse on 1 November 1935 and took part in operations in Waziristan in 1936 and 1937.

Baker was promoted to local temporary brigadier and given temporary command of the Kohat Brigade on 20 May 1936. He then reverted to local temporary colonel and was given temporary command of the Tochi column on 10 December 1936. He was appointed an Officer of the Order of the British Empire on 10 December 1937 for service in his role as commander officer of the 2nd Sialkot Cavalry Brigade during operations in Waziristan from 25 November 1936 to 16 January 1937. He was also mentioned in despatches for his service in Waziristan for the period 25 November 1936 to 16 January 1937. Promoted to colonel on 15 January 1938 with seniority from 1 July 1934, he became Commander (as temporary brigadier) of the Delhi Brigade Area on 15 January 1938.

== World War II ==
Baker also saw service in World War II. He was appointed aide-de-camp to the King on 1 April 1940, promoted to acting major-general on 16 June 1940 and promoted to the substantive rank of major-general on 26 October 1940 with seniority from 22 April 1940. He became Director of Organization at Army Headquarters, India on 10 July 1940 and was appointed a Companion of the Order of the Bath on 1 January 1941. He became Deputy Adjutant General before becoming Adjutant-General, India on 24 October 1941 with the acting rank of lieutenant general. He was promoted to the substantive rank of lieutenant general on 16 August 1942. Baker retired on 6 June 1944 and was appointed a Knight Commander of the Order of the Indian Empire on 8 June 1944.

== Personal life ==
He married Dorothy (née Lace) in 1924, third daughter of botanist John Henry Lace CIE of the Imperial Forest Service. They had one son and one daughter. Baker died on 28 December 1964 in Devon, England.

== Bibliography ==
- Smart, Nick (2005). Biographical Dictionary of British Generals of the Second World War. Barnesley: Pen & Sword. ISBN 1844150496.

Military offices
Preceded by Brodie Haig	Adjutant-General, India; 1941−1944	Succeeded by Sir Ralph Deedes
