= 255th Indian Tank Brigade =

5th Indian Armoured Brigade 255th Indian Armoured Brigade 255th Indian Tank Brigade 1st Armoured Brigade
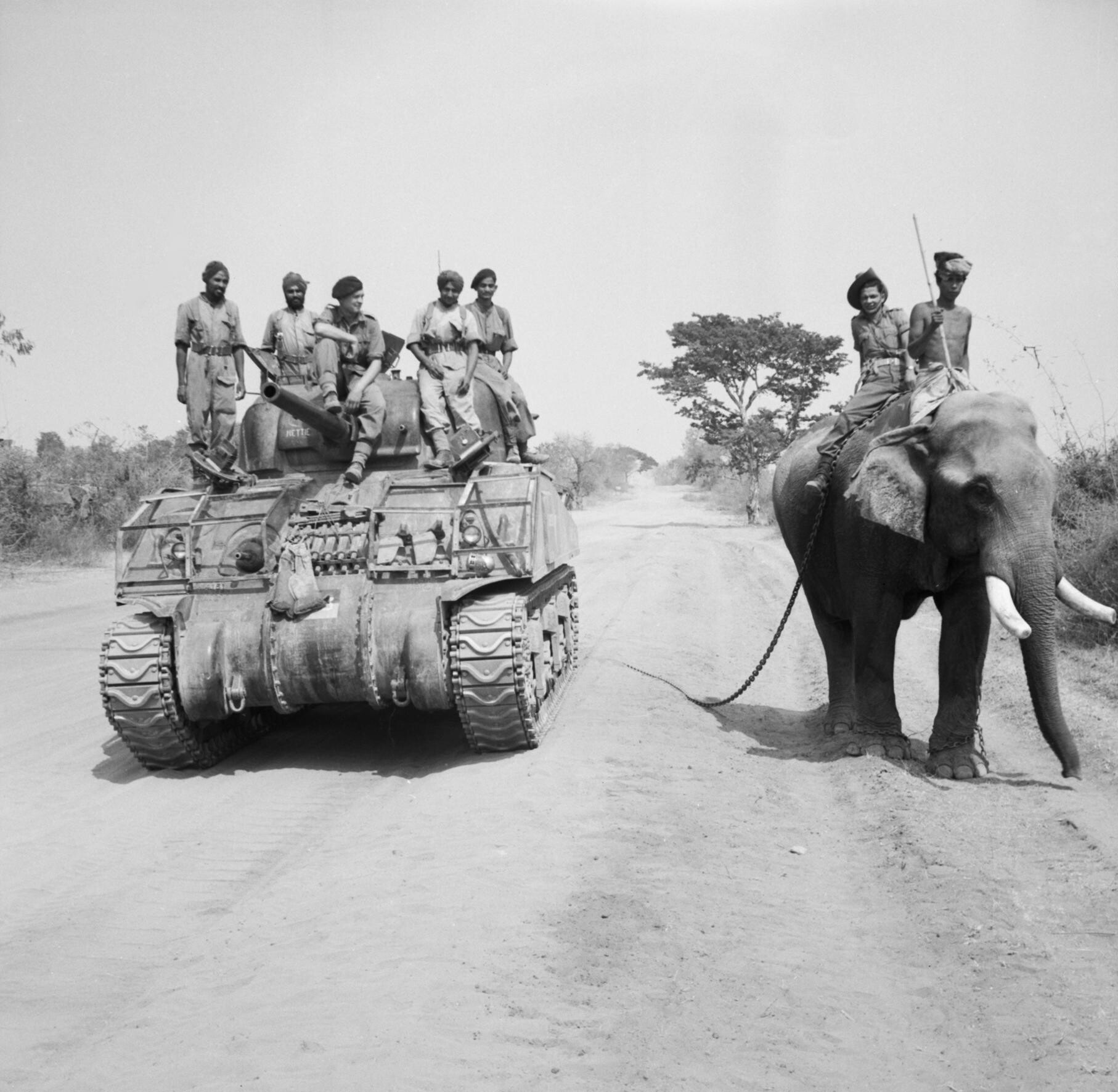
- 9th Deccan Horse, Burma.
- Active: 1941–1946
- Country: British India
- Allegiance: British Empire
- Branch: British Indian Army
- Equipment: Stuart tank M4 Sherman tank
- Engagements: Battle of Meiktila and Mandalay; Battle of Pokoku and Irrawaddy River operations
- Battle honours: Burma 1944–1945

The 255th Indian Tank Brigade was an armoured brigade of the Indian Army during World War II. It was part of the Fourteenth Army and saw action in the Burma Campaign. The 255th Tank Brigade's tactical sign was a black bull, with yellow horns and red eyes, on a royal blue triangle. The brigade fought with the 17th Indian Infantry Division in Burma and was involved in the Battle of Meiktila, the Battle of Pokoku and Irrawaddy River operations and during Operation Dracula.

The brigade was raised in June 1941 as 5th Indian Armoured Brigade and redesignated 255th Indian Armoured Brigade in October 1941. The name was changed again to the 255th Indian Tank Brigade in August 1944. In October 1944 it moved to the Imphal plain and came under command of IV Corps. The brigade crossed the Irrawaddy under command of the 17th Indian Infantry Division in February 1945.

The brigade was redesignated in June 1946 as the 1st Armoured Brigade and assigned to the 1st Armoured Division, with which it was serving at Secunderabad when the Partition of India took place in August 1947.

== Component units (February 1945) ==
- 16th Light Cavalry, Armoured Cars
- 116th Royal Armoured Corps (Gordon Highlanders), Sherman tanks
- 5th King Edward's Own Probyn's Horse, Stuart tanks
- 9th Royal Deccan Horse, Sherman tanks
- 4th Battalion, 4th Bombay Grenadiers (motor infantry battalion)
- 6th Battalion, 7th Rajput Regiment (HQ/Defence battalion 17th Indian Division, attached)
- 36th Field Squadron, Q.V.O. Madras Sappers & Miners Group, Indian Engineers
- 3rd Independent Bridging Troop, R.A.C
- 9th Light Field Ambulance, I. A. M. C.
- Elements of 18th Field Regiment RA - SP Guns

== Commander ==
- Brigadier H. H. Stable (June 1941 - November 1943)
- Brigadier C. E. Pert (November 1943 - May 1945)
- Brigadier R. Younger (May - November 1945)
- Brigadier J. M. W. Martin (November 1945 - November 1947)
- Brigadier Tara Singh Bal (November 1947 - March 1948)

== See also ==
- List of Indian Army Brigades in World War II
