= 10th Indian Motor Brigade =

- Active: 1942–1943
- Country: British India
- Allegiance: British Crown
- Branch: British Indian Army
- Size: Brigade

Commanders
- Notable commanders: Brigadier H. Redman; Brigadier F W McCallum

The 10th Indian Motor Brigade was a formation of the Indian Army during World War II. It was formed in Egypt in March 1942. The brigade left Egypt for Persia in September 1942 and was converted to the 60th Indian Infantry Brigade in July 1943.

During its time active the brigade was under the command of three different higher formations, the 10th Armoured Division, the 51st Highland Division, and, from September 1942 to 1943, the Tenth Army.

== Formation ==
- 1st Duke of York's Own Skinner's Horse
- Central India Horse (21st King George V's Own Horse)
- 5th Battalion, 13th Frontier Force Rifles
- 10th Queen Victoria's Own Frontier Force Guides Cavalry [May - June 1942]
- 402nd Field Squadron Indian Engineers

and from November 1942

- 3rd Battalion, 11th Sikh Regiment
- 4th Battalion, 8th Punjab Regiment

== See also ==
- List of Indian Army Brigades in World War II
