= 3rd Indian Infantry Brigade =

- Active: 1939–1940
- Country: British India
- Allegiance: British Crown
- Branch: British Indian Army
- Size: Brigade

The 3rd Indian Infantry Brigade was an Infantry formation of the Indian Army during World War II. It was formed at Jhelum in India in September 1939. In August 1943, it was renamed the Frontier Reserve Brigade

== Formation ==
- 1st Battalion, 16th Punjab Regiment September 1939 to October 1940
- 1st Battalion, 10th Baluch Regiment September 1939 to April 1940
- 2nd Battalion, Worcestershire Regiment September to October 1939
- 1st Battalion, 1st Gurkha Rifles September to October 1939
- 1st Battalion, 3rd Gurkha Rifles February to September 1940
- 1st Battalion, 12th Frontier Force Regiment February to March 1940
- 1st Battalion, Somerset Light Infantry February to March 1940
- 1st Battalion, 17th Dogra Regiment May 1940 to April 1941
- 4th Battalion, 9th Jat Regiment May to September 1940
- 3rd Battalion, 4th Bombay Grenadiers March to October 1941
- 9th Battalion, 10th Baluch Regiment August 1941 to May 1942
- 4th Battalion, 3rd Gurkha Rifles October 1941 to January 1942
- 7th Battalion, 1st Punjab Regiment December 1941 to March 1943
- 4th Battalion, Jammu and Kashmir Infantry Indian State Forces January to February 1942
- 9th Battalion, 10th Baluch Regiment July to November 1942
- 4th Battalion, 18th Royal Garhwal Rifles August to October 1942
- 6th Battalion, 6th Rajputana Rifles November 19423 to August 1943
- 9th Battalion, 10th Baluch Regiment December 1942 to April 1943
- 15th Battalion, 6th Rajputana Rifles December 1942 to August 1943
- 27th Battalion, 13th Frontier Force Rifles December 1942 to February 1943
- 3rd Battalion, 6th Gurkha Rifles March to July 1943
- 15th Battalion, 1st Punjab Regiment October 1943 to September 1944

== See also ==
- List of Indian Army Brigades in World War II
