= Brodie Haig =

British Indian Army general (1886–1957)

Sir Brodie Haig KCB MC*
- Born: 31 January 1886; Kensington, London
- Died: 9 February 1957 (aged 71)
- Burial place: La Croix Cemetery, Grouville, Jersey
- Spouse: Marguerite Theodora Hyde Wadley
- Military career
- Allegiance: United Kingdom
- Branch: British Indian Army
- Service years: 1905–1942
- Rank: General
- Service number: 191075
- Commands: Southern Command (India) (1941–42); Staff College, Quetta (1937–40); 7th Dehra Dun Brigade (1933–35); 4th Battalion 14th Punjab Regiment (1930–32)
- Conflicts: First World War; Second World War
- Awards: Knight Commander of the Order of the Bath; Military Cross & Bar; Mentioned in Despatches

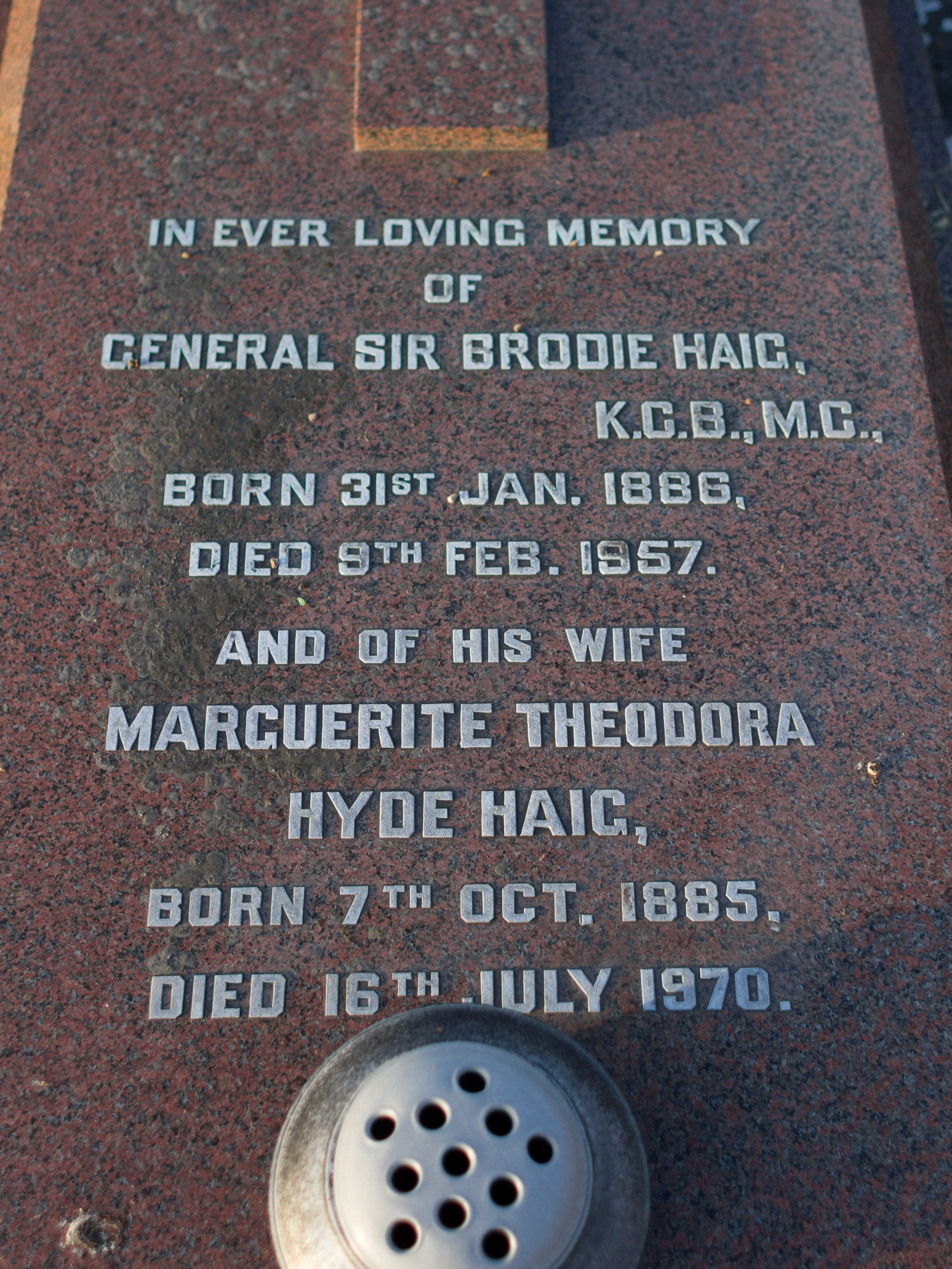
Haig's resting place in Grouville, Jersey

General Sir Arthur Brodie Haig, KCB, MC & Bar (31 January 1886 – 9 February 1957) was a senior officer in the British Indian Army. A pre-war regular officer, he served in India prior to the outbreak of the First World War when he was posted to the Middle East. He was wounded at the Battle of Shaiba, twice mentioned in despatches and awarded the Military Cross (MC), before he was taken prisoner by the Ottoman Empire at the Siege of Kut. Escaping captivity in August 1918, he received a Bar to his MC.

Haig returned to India after the war, holding a succession of staff appointments and command of a brigade. After the start of the Second World War, he was appointed Quartermaster General of Army Headquarters, India and promoted to lieutenant general. He later became General Officer Commanding-in-Chief of Southern Command in India before his retirement in 1942.

== First World War ==
Haig attended the Royal Military College, Sandhurst, and was commissioned as a second lieutenant on the unattached list for the British Indian Army on 18 January 1905. He was first attached to a British Army regiment in India for a year then appointed to the 24th Punjabis, Indian Army on 19 March 1906. He received promotion to lieutenant on 18 April 1907 and to captain on 18 January 1914.

During the First World War, Haig served in Egypt from 18 November 1914 to 22 March 1915 and Mesopotamia from 7 April 1915 to 29 April 1916, when he was taken prisoner at the Fall of Kut. During this time he was wounded (on 14 April 1915 at the Battle of Shaiba), was mentioned in despatches twice and was awarded the Military Cross and Bar. The Bar to his Military Cross was for successfully escaping from his prisoner of war camp in August 1918. This was awarded 10 June 1920.

== Return to India ==
Haig was appointed temporary major (for service in India only) on 14 September 1919, at the same time becoming a General Staff Officer (2nd grade) until 30 September 1920. He was re-appointed a General Staff Officer (2nd grade) on 1 April 1922 for the United Provinces district until 20 February 1923. He was appointed an instructor at Staff College, Quetta on 21 February 1923.

Haig attended the Imperial Defence College in 1929, then was appointed brevet lieutenant colonel then promoted to substantive lieutenant colonel, which was confirmed on 10 February 1930. Haig was appointed commanding officer of the 4th Battalion, 14th Punjab Regiment on 10 February 1930.

Haig was appointed a temporary brigadier and substantive colonel on 4 June 1932, upon his appointment as Deputy Director of Staff Duties (and General Staff Officer Grade 1). He vacated this position on 25 October 1933 and was appointed to command the 7th Dehra Dun Brigade (retaining his temporary brigadier rank). Haig was appointed Deputy Adjutant and Quartermaster General of the Eastern Command on 28 February 1936, once more retaining the temporary rank of brigadier.

Haig received promotion to major general on 6 June 1936 and ceased to be Deputy Adjutant and Quartermaster General on 27 April 1937. He was appointed a Companion of the Order of the Bath on 1 February 1937. Haig became colonel of the 4th Battalion, 14th Punjab Regiment on 9 July 1937 and the same year was appointed commandant of the Quetta Staff College.

== Second World War ==
Haig was appointed Quartermaster General of Army Headquarters, India and acting lieutenant general on 16 March 1940. This was confirmed as a substantive rank on 1 April that year. He became a full general on 10 May 1941 and was appointed Adjutant-General of India on 15 May. From October 1941 until June 1942, he was General Officer Commanding-in-Chief of Southern Command. He was appointed a Knight Commander of the Order of the Bath on 11 June 1942. He retired on 16 August 1942.

Military offices
Preceded by Guy Williams	Commandant of the Staff College, Quetta; 1937–1940	Succeeded by Philip Christison
Preceded by Sir Roger Wilson	Adjutant-General, India; May–October 1941	Succeeded by Sir William Baker
Preceded by Thomas Riddell-Webster	GOC-in-C Southern Command, India; 1941–1942	Succeeded by Sir Noel Beresford-Peirse
