= Dinjan =

Dinjan Dinjoy gaon
- town/small suburb
- Nickname: Dinjan
- Location in Assam, India Dinjan (India)
- Coordinates: 27°30′0″N 95°10′0″E
- Country: India
- State: Assam
- District: Dibrugarh
- Elevation: 106 m (348 ft)

Languages
  - Official: Assamese
- Time zone: UTC+5:30 (IST)
- Postal code: 786189
- Vehicle registration: AS-06 AS-23
- Coastline: 0 kilometres (0 mi)

Dinjan (or Dinjoy gaon) is a small township in Dibrugarh district of Assam, India. It is located in the tea growing area of Assam. The closest town to it is Tinsukia. During World War II, nearby Dinjan Airfield was used by transport aircraft which carried supplies over The Hump to Kunming, China for the Chinese army.

== Geography ==
It is located at 27°30′0″N 95°10′0″E at an elevation of 400 ft above MSL.

== Education ==
Army Public School was established in Dinjan in 1986. In 2016, it had 758 students.

== Location ==
National Highway 37 passes through Dinjan.

== Getting There ==
The nearest major railway station to Dinjan is Tinsukia (NTSK) which is at a distance of 12.5 kilometres. The nearest airport is at Mohanbari, Dibrugarh which is at a distance of 45 kilometres.
