= 251st Indian Tank Brigade =

- Active: 1940–1943
- Country: British India
- Allegiance: British Crown
- Branch: British Indian Army
- Size: Brigade

Commanders
- Notable commanders: Brigadier Robert Wordsworth

The 251st Indian Tank Brigade was an armoured formation of the Indian Army during World War II. It was to be formed in early 1940 as the 1st Indian Motor Brigade and then went through a number of different changes in title. In July 1940 it was raised as the 1st Indian Armoured Brigade, renamed 251st Indian Armoured Brigade in October 1941 and finally renamed 251st (Independent) Indian Tank Brigade in September 1942.

It was under the command of 1st Indian Armoured Division later known as the 31st Indian Armoured Division from September 1940 to June 1942.

The brigade was disbanded in October 1943, never having seen active service.

== Composition ==
- 3rd Carabiniers (November 1941 - December 1943)
- Probyn's Horse (5th King Edward VII's Own Lancers)
- Royal Deccan Horse (9th Horse)
- 14th Prince of Wales's Own Scinde Horse (November 1941 - April 1942)
- 2nd Battalion, 4th Bombay Grenadiers (December 1942 - September 1943)
- 488th Field Battery, 123rd Field Regiment, Royal Artillery (attached 6 September to December 1942)

== See also ==
- List of Indian Army Brigades in World War II
