= James Bruce Scott =

British Indian Army officer

Major-General James Bruce Scott CB DSO MC
- Born: 25 December 1892
- Died: 30 May 1974 (aged 81); London
- Military career
- Allegiance: United Kingdom
- Branch: British Indian Army
- Service years: 1912–1947
- Rank: Major-General
- Service number: 191592
- Units: 6th Gurkha Rifles; 8th Gurkha Rifles
- Commands: 1st Battalion, 6th Gurkha Rifles; 1st Battalion, 8th Gurkha Rifles; Maymyo Brigade; 1st Burma Division
- Conflicts: First World War; First Waziristan Campaign; Second World War
- Awards: Companion of the Distinguished Service Order; Distinguished Service Order; Military Cross; Mentioned in Dispatches

Major-General James Bruce Scott CB DSO MC (25 December 1892 – 30 May 1974) was a British Indian Army officer who commanded the 1st Burma Division during the Japanese invasion of Burma in 1942.

== Early life ==
Scott was the son of James Scott CIE. He was educated at Exeter School and the Royal Military College, Sandhurst.

== Military career ==
He was commissioned onto the Unattached List for the Indian Army on 20 January 1912. He was appointed to the Indian Army on 13 March 1913 and the 33rd Punjabis.

During the First World War he served in Egypt in 1914, France in 1915, Egypt & Aden in 1916 and German East Africa in 1917. He was wounded and was awarded the Military Cross in 1918. He was appointed a company commander and second in command of the 2nd battalion, 28th Punjabis on 23 August 1918. Following the war he served during the Afghanistan & North West Frontier operations in 1919. He served on the Waziristan campaign (1919–20) and Waziristan campaign (1921–24) was Mentioned in Despatches.

He joined the 1st Battalion, 6th Gurkha Rifles on 20 July 1922 and appointed a company commander 8 July 1924. He served on North West Frontier during 1930-31 operations and was Mentioned in Despatches. Scott served as a General Staff Officer grade 2 from 1 April 1932 to 31 December 1933 on the staff of the Directorate of Military Operations at the Headquarters of the Army in India. He then served on the North West Frontier (Mohmand) operations in 1933.

He was appointed an Assistant Director, Intelligence at Peshawar from 1 January 1934 until November 1935 when he was posted to the 1st Battalion, 8th Gurkha Rifles as second in command and officiating commandant.

On 2 November 1936, Scott was promoted lieutenant-colonel and assumed command of the 1st Battalion, 8th Gurkha Rifles. On 29 June 1939, Scott was transferred to Burma where he was appointed to command the newly formed Maymyo Brigade and promoted to the rank of local brigadier.

On 1 July 1941, Scott was promoted acting major-general and assumed command of the embryonic 1st Burma Division. This formation was raised in response to the increased tension in South East Asia, and comprised the Maymyo Brigade (re-designated as the 1st Burma Infantry Brigade) the newly formed 2nd Burma Infantry Brigade and the 13th Indian Infantry Brigade, which had arrived from India in April 1941. The 1st Burma Division was one of only two British divisional formations in Burma at the time of the Japanese invasion. Scott commanded the division throughout the difficult Burma campaign of 1942. In the retreat from Rangoon his division was trapped in the vicinity of Yenangyaung and his force had to fight its way out of the encirclement to link up with the force sent to rescue it. During the campaign, Scott was promoted temporary major-general on 1 July 1942. He successfully extracted his division from Burma and led it into India. Scott was awarded the Distinguished Service Order (DSO) on 28 October 1942 for his leadership in Burma. On arrival in India, the 1st Burma Division was re-designated as the 39 Indian Infantry Division on 20 June 1942.

Scott was appointed as the Inspector of Infantry in India with effect from 28 March 1943, his promotion to major-general being made substantive on 20 June 1943. On 12 November 1943, he was appointed General Officer Commanding Peshawar District in India. He was made a Companion of the Order of the Bath (CB) on 1 January 1944. After three years in post, Scott relinquished his command on 12 November 1946, retiring from the Indian Army on 10 May 1947.

Scott died in 1974, aged 81.

== Bibliography ==
- Smart, Nick (2005). Biographical Dictionary of British Generals of the Second World War. Barnesley: Pen & Sword. ISBN 1844150496.
