= 79 Medium Regiment (India) =

Artillery regiment of the Indian Army

- Active: 1967 – present
- Country: India
- Allegiance: India
- Branch: Indian Army
- Type: Artillery
- Size: Regiment
- Mottos: Sarvatra, Izzat-O-Iqbal (Everywhere with Honour and Glory). Nishchey Shubh Karman Jeet (निश्चय शुभ कर्मन जीत),
- Colors: Red & Navy Blue
- Equipment: Haubits FH77

Insignia
- Abbreviation: 79 Med Regt

79 Medium Regiment is part of the Regiment of Artillery of the Indian Army.

== Formation ==
79 Medium Regiment was raised on 01 March 1967 at Belgaum under the command of Lieutenant Colonel CM Gupta, VSM. The manpower was drawn from three existing units – 24 Medium, 39 Medium and 92 Field Regiments.

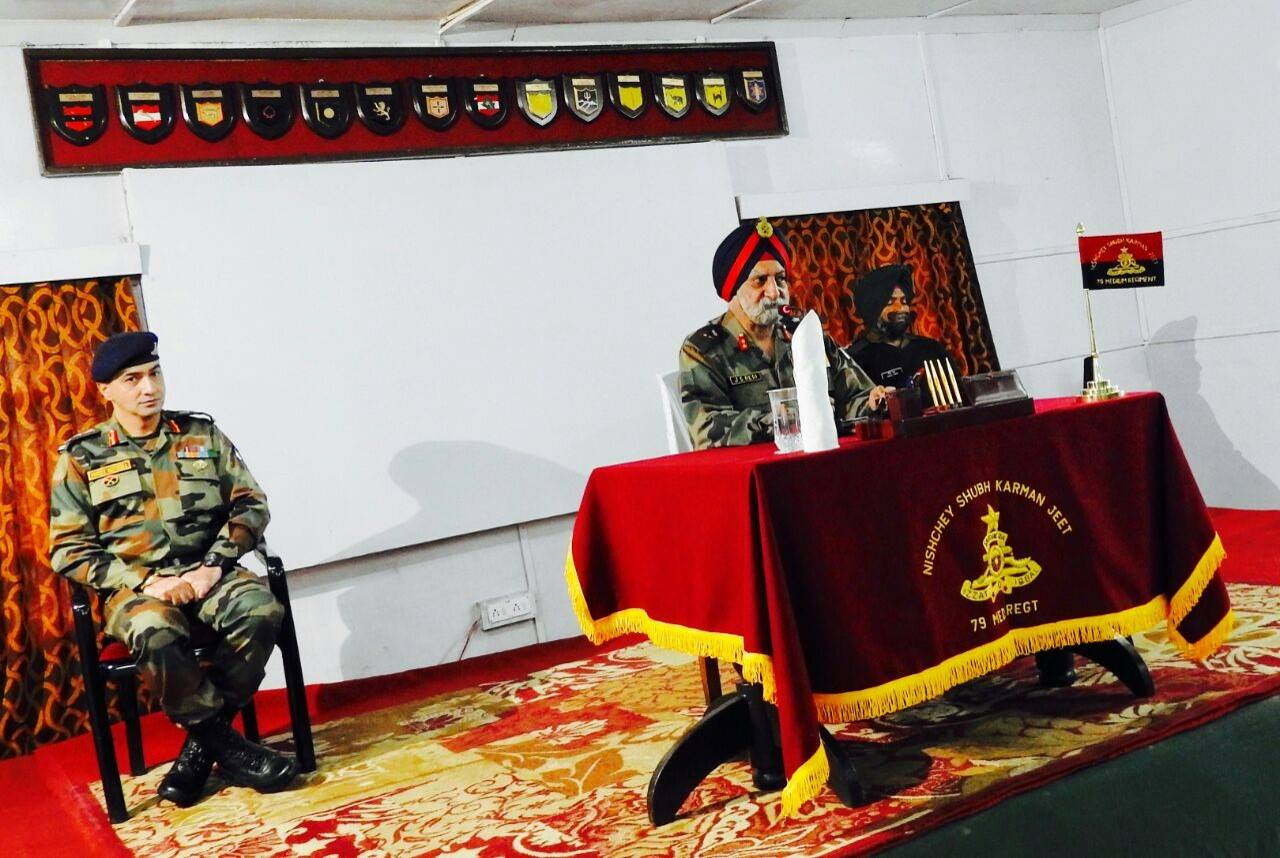
79 Medium Regiment Golden Jubilee Celebrations, 1 March 2017

== Class composition ==
The unit is a ‘Single Class’ regiment composed of Sikh gunners.

== Equipment ==
The regiment was equipped with 130 mm guns in 1967, which it used till 1986. During its tenure in Jammu and Kashmir (1978 to 1981), the regiment used 5.5 inch howitzers. It was the first regiment of the Indian Army to be inducted with the Bofors FH77B guns and weapon systems. (Note: 285 Medium Regiment was the first regiment to receive Bofors FH77B guns, which they later handed over to 218 Medium Regiment. 79 Medium Regiment became the first regiment to be equipped with the complete ‘weapon system’.)

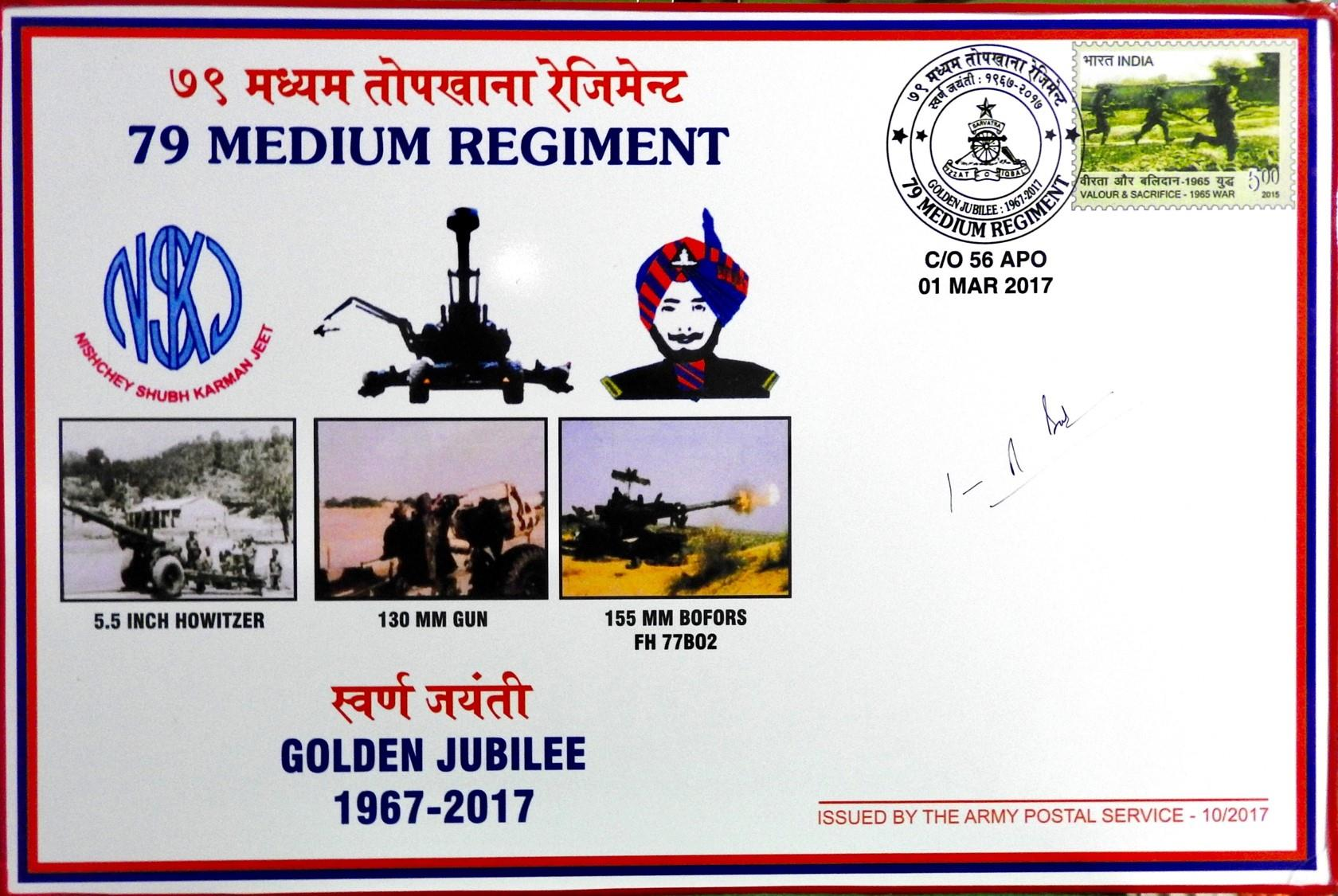
Golden Jubilee - Special Cover issued by the Army Postal Service, March 2017

== Operations ==
The regiment has taken part in the following operations –

- Indo-Pakistani War of 1971: It participated in Operation Cactus Lily and was deployed in the western sector, providing artillery support to an Infantry Brigade and a Parachute Brigade.
- Operation Trident
- Operation Meghdoot
- Operation Vijay
- Operation Parakram
- Operation Rakshak I and II – Counter insurgency operations in Punjab and Jammu and Kashmir.

== Honours and awards ==
Personnel from the regiment have been awarded the following –

- Vir Chakra – 1
- Param Vishisht Seva Medal – 2
- Uttam Yudh Seva Medal – 1
- Ati Vishisht Seva Medal – 4
- Sena Medals – 9
- COAS Commendation Cards – 7
- VCOAS Commendation Cards – 11
- GOC-in-C Commendation Cards – 14

The regiment has to its credit the following achievements –

- The regiment had the honour to participate in the Republic Day Parade in 1988 with its 155 mm guns.
- Subedar (Honorary Captain) Baldev Singh represented the country in the 20 kilometres race walk in the Asian Games.
- The regiment has produced the following general officers -
  - Brigadier NN Kharbanda – commanded the unit from May 1974 to November 1977.
  - Brigadier Deepak Sethi – commanded the unit from September 1987 to January 1990.
  - Lieutenant General KK Kohli AVSM, VSM – commanded the unit from January 1990 to June 1992, was GOC of 21 Mountain Division, Commandant of the Officers Training Academy, Chief of Staff of South Western Command.
  - Major General Ravi Harsh Vardhan – commanded the unit from April 1995 to September 1997, was GOC of 29 Infantry Division (Gurj division)
  - Lieutenant General Anil K Ahuja PVSM, UYSM, AVSM, SM, VSM – commanded the unit from September 1997 to June 2000. Was GOC IV Corps, Additional Director General - Military Operations and Deputy Chief of Integrated Defence Staff (Policy Planning and Force Development).
  - Major General JS Bedi, PVSM – commanded the unit from July 2000 to June 2003. He was the Colonel Commandant of Regiment of Artillery.

== Motto ==
The motto of the regiment is Nishchey Shubh Karman Jeet (निश्चय शुभ कर्मन जीत), which loosely translates to ‘Determination and good deeds will ensure victory.’

== See also ==
- List of artillery regiments of Indian Army
