= Battle of Yenangyaung =

1942 battle of World War II

Coordinates: 20°29′41.7″N 94°54′09.1″E

- Part of the Japanese invasion of Burma, the Burma campaign, the South-East Asian theatre of World War II, the Second Sino-Japanese War, the China Burma India Theater and the Pacific Theater of World War II
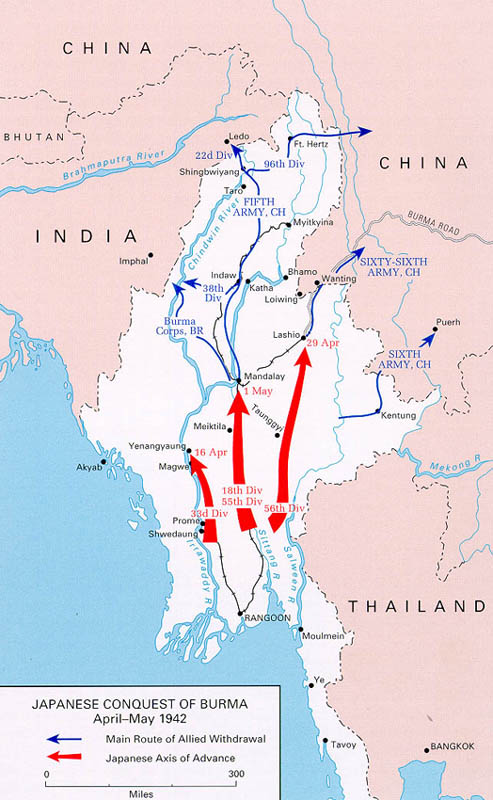
- The Japanese conquest of Burma (the left red arrow represents Japanese movements to Yenangyaung)
Date	16–19 April 1942 (3 days)
Location	Yenangyaung city in Burma
Result	Japanese victory

Belligerents
China; United Kingdom: India	Japan

Commanders and leaders
(Republic of China (1912–1949)) Sun Liren (Republic of China (1912–1949)) Liu Fangwu (United Kingdom) James Scott (United Kingdom) John Anstice	Shozo Sakurai

Units involved
Chinese Expeditionary Force; New 38th Division; 113th Regiment (main assault); 112th Regiment (covering force); 1st Burma Division; 7th Armoured Brigade	33rd Division

Strength
113th regiment : 1,121; 112th regiment : 1,703 : 7,000	10,000

Casualties and losses
: 113th regiment : 204 killed 318 wounded 20 missing 112th regiment : 33 killed 15 wounded	Chinese claim : 700+ killed or wounded, 3 captured

The Battle of Yenangyaung (Chinese: 仁安羌大捷; pinyin: Rén'ānqiāng Dàjié; lit. 'Great Victory at Yenangyaung') was fought in Burma (now Myanmar) from 16 to 19 April 1942. As part of the Burma Campaign of World War II, the battle was fought between Chinese and British allied forces on one side and Japanese forces on the other. The battle took place in the vicinity of Yenangyaung and its oil fields.

== Background ==
The Japanese 55th Division invaded Burma on 22 December 1941. Following the capture of Rangoon in March 1942, the Allies regrouped in Central Burma. The newly formed Burma Corps, which consisted of British, Indian, and locally raised Burmese troops, was commanded by Lieutenant General William Slim. This force aimed to defend the Irrawaddy River valley; meanwhile, the Chinese Expeditionary Force in Burma protected the Sittaung River valley to the east. After Japanese forces captured Singapore and the Dutch East Indies, they were able to use divisions released due to their conquest. They also captured trucks to reinforce their army in Burma and launch attacks into Central Burma.

One objective for the Japanese forces in the Irrawaddy River valley was to capture the Yenangyaung oil fields. The battle for these oil fields began on 10 April and lasted a week. The Japanese attacked the 1st Burma Division on the Allied right and the 48th Indian Infantry Brigade at Kokkogwa at night during a storm; however, casualties stopped them. On the next day, the 2nd Royal Tank Regiment (2nd RTR) was engaged near Magwe at Thadodan and Alebo. From April 13 to 17, the British forces retreated under Japanese assaults. On several occasions, Japanese roadblocks split the Burma Frontier Force (an internal security force acting as infantry), the 1st Burma Division, the British 7th Armoured Brigade HQ and the 2nd RTR into three forces.

On April 15, Lieutenant General Slim gave orders for the oil fields and refinery to be demolished. General Harold Alexander, who commanded the Burma Army, asked Lieutenant General Joseph Stilwell, the American commander of the China Burma India Theater and Chief of Staff to Chiang Kai-shek, to move the New 38th Division into the Yenangyaung area immediately.

== Battle ==
On 16 April, almost 7,000 British soldiers, along with 500 prisoners and civilians, were encircled by an equal number of Japanese soldiers from the IJA 33rd Division at Yenangyaung and its oil field.

The 33rd Division was able to advance between Slim's 17th Division at Taungdwingyi and the 1st Burma Division south of Yenangyaung. Fearing that the Burma Corps may become trapped, Slim called upon Sun Liren's Chinese New 38th Division for help.

Fires at Yenanguang emanating from destroyed equipment and facilities

General Sun requested to lead his entire division to help the 1st Burma Division, but General Luo Zhuoying, the commander of the Chinese Expeditionary Force in Burma, refused. On 17 April, General Sun led his 113th Regiment, which consisted of 1,121 men, 800 of whom were combat personnel, on the mission instead. Because the Chinese forces had no artillery or tanks, Lieutenant General Slim assigned the 7th Armoured Brigade, which was commanded by Brigadier John Anstice, to General Sun. The brigade consisted of two regiments (battalions) of M3 Stuart light tanks and a battery of 25-pounder guns.

For the next three days, the Chinese forces attacked southwards. The temperatures reached 114 °F (46 °C) and smoke from the demolished oil wells and refineries hung over the battlefield.

Meanwhile, the 1st Burma Division fought its way to and across the Pin Chaung river, where they met with the relief column on 19 April. On the next day, the Chinese forces attacked southwards toward Yenangyaung and Pin Chaung. The attack caused the Japanese to suffer casualties, but the Allied forces could not keep the oil fields and had to retreat to the north. The retreat was covered by the newly arrived 112th Regiment of the New 38th Division which engaged with Japanese forces until the following day when it joined its sister regiment in retreating from the battlefield.

== Results ==
According to historian Louis Allen, the British were "deprived of a supply port at Rangoon, [and] then of [their] source of fuel at Yenangyaung[;] the question was no longer whether to retreat, but where to?"

== Legacy ==
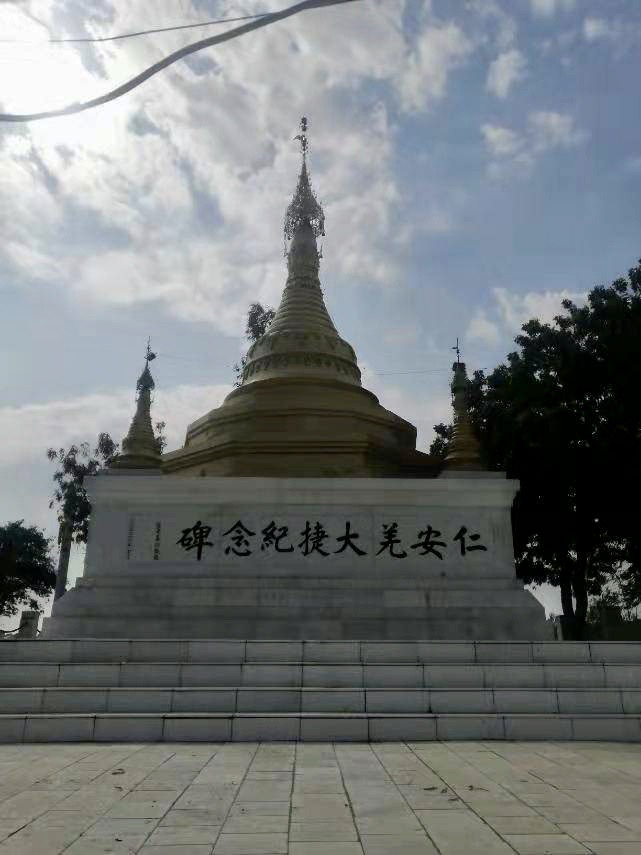
The Monument to the Great Victory of Yenangyaung

In 2013, the Monument to the Great Victory of Yenangyaung was erected to commemorate the battle. It was promoted by Liu Weimin, the son of Liu Fangwu, the commander of the 113th Regiment.

== See also ==
- Yenangyaung
- Battle of Toungoo
- Chinese Army in India
- New 1st Army
- Du Yuming
- Sun Liren
- National Revolutionary Army

== Sources ==
- Hsu Long-hsuen and Chang Ming-kai, History of The Sino-Japanese War (1937–1945), 2nd Ed., 1971. Translated by Wen Ha-hsiung, Chung Wu Publishing; 33, 140th Lane, Tung-hwa Street, Taipei, Taiwan Republic of China. Pg. 377
- Slim, William (1956). Defeat into Victory. London: Cassell. ISBN 0-304-29114-5.
