= Burma Military Police =

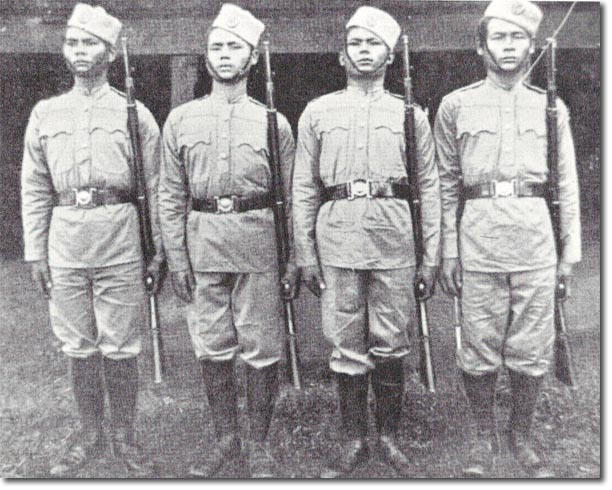
- Karen soldiers of BMP in 1898
- Active: 1886–1942
- Country: India (1886-1937); Burma (1937-1942)
- Allegiance: British Empire
- Type: Army
- Size: 1886: c. 500; 1941: c. 4,300
- Equipment: Martini–Henry; Lee–Enfield
- Engagements: Burmese resistance movement 1915 Kachin Hills uprising Kuki rebellion Second World War

Commanders
- Notable commanders: Herbert Raitt; Henry Keary

The Burma Military Police (BMP) was a paramilitary force of British Burma. Its main functions were the pacification of Upper Burma and the policing of the Burmese frontier. The force was made up of Indian and Burmese recruits.

Dating back to 1886, it was formally established under the Upper Burma Military Police Regulation in 1887, which was superseded the same year by the Burma Military Police Act.

In July 1917, the 85th Burman Rifles were raised from the Burma Military Police.

After the separation of Burma from British India, most battalions of the Burma Military Police became part of the new Burma Frontier Force, which after the Second World War became the Burma Frontier Constabulary. The remaining battalions were allocated to the Inspector-General of Police, Burma in 1942.

== History ==
=== Formation ===
The Burma Military Police was raised in 1886 to reduce the cost of controlling Upper Burma by replacing regular Indian army units. The first unit of the BMP was the Mogaung Levy in March 1886. The Mogaung Levy was a Gurkha unit and was later absorbed into the Bhamo Military Police battalion. In 1886, it had a strength of 500, declining to 262 in 1919. Initial forces of the BMP were raised from Punjab and Nepal, and recruited Punjabi, Indian, Assamese, Manipuri and Gurkha men. At the time, local ethnic groups in Burma were not allowed into the BMP as they were seen as unsuitable. However, the range of ethnic groups being recruited was expanded in 1909 when Chins became the first non-Indian ethnicity to join. The range now included Garhwali, Sikh, Rajput, Chin, Kareni and Burmese men. However, very few Burmese joined the BMP.

=== World War I and Interwar ===
In 1914, the Putao battalion was raised in Putao and consisted of Gurkhas. Also in 1914, experienced soldiers of the BMP were sent to fight on the Western Front for the British Empire. In total, 4,650 BMP soldiers were transferred to fight in World War I. On the Western Front, they were tasked with supporting various regiments in Flanders and France, and also served in the Gallipoli campaign. Back in Burma though, this left the BMP mostly staffed by young and inexperienced forces. This then fueled groups of Kachins to rise up in the 1915 Kachin Hills uprising in the Hukawng valley, which was under the jurisdiction of the BMP Myitkyina battalion. Fighting began on 2 January and would last until February. BMP forces in the rebellion were led by Herbert Raitt. In July 1918, the 85th Burma Rifles was raised with mostly 1,025 Indian men in Mandalay.

In 1917, when the Kuki Rebellion began, the British were reliant on the BMP and Assam Rifles to deal with Kuki rebels. As the rebellion continued, the BMP had their Martini-Henry rifles replaced by .303-inch long Lee-Enfield magazine rifles. The BMP was also issued with Lewis guns, rifle grenades, and four Stokes trench mortars. Stokes trench mortars would later prove important in breaking Kuki defences. Eleven BMP soldiers who served in the war would later earn the Indian Distinguished Service Medal.

In April 1937, six battalions of the BMP became part of the newly established Burma Frontier Force. These battalions were mainly made up of Indian and Gurkha forces. Following the transfer of six battalions to the BFF, the BMP was left with only three battalions which came under control of the Civil Administration under the Burma Home Office. The three battalions were the Mandalay battalion and the 1st and 2nd Rangoon battalions. In 1938, 2,000 men of the BMP were deployed in Rangoon to prevent riots and civil unrest in the city.

=== World War II ===
In early 1940, the Governor of Burma, Archibald Douglas Cochrane, began expanding the BMP by transferring 452 men of the Burma Frontier Force to the BMP. By February 1941, the BMP consisted of 4,301. In November 1941, Governor Reginald Dorman-Smith authorised an ordinance which allowed the BMP to be placed under the General Officer commanding the Burma army in the event of a war in Asia. Before the Japanese invasion, the BMP was being given small unit tactical training by the Burma army.

Eventually, the Japanese invaded Burma on 14 December 1941 from Thailand. From February 1942 onwards, the BMP come under the control of the 17th Indian Infantry division. Also in February, the BMP provided platoons to watch the Burmese coast in order to detect a possible Japanese landing. Before February 20, the 1st and 2nd Rangoon battalions began a withdrawal from Rangoon. Once the Japanese took Rangoon in March, detachments from the BMP provided the 17th Indian Infantry division patrols on its flank when the army was retreating from the advancing Japanese. Throughout the war, the BMP escorted transportation and communication for the division. Meanwhile, the Mandalay battalion was tasked with protected the railway lines between Myitkyina and Mandalay. The battalion would remain headquartered in Mandalay up until the Japanese capture of the city. When they began a withdrawal from Mandalay, many of the Burmese who made up the battalion deserted.

On 20 February 1942, the BMP came under the control of the Burma army, where it was then dissolved and incorporated into the 1st Burma Corps. On 6 April, a group of men from the Rangoon battalions were transferred to the 17th Indian Infantry division. Later on 15 June, the 10,000 former men of the BMP were sent to Hoshiarpur, Punjab and from June to December 1942, they were examined to determine their ability for service in the Burma regiment established in October 1942.

== Strength ==
The BMP was made up of Indian and Burmese recruits. In 1932, the BMP consisted of eight battalions: 1st and 2nd Rangoon, Mandalay, Chin Hills, Northern Shan States, Southern Shan States, Bhamo, Myitkyina and the Pyawbwe battalion. By April 1937, only the first three battalions remained in the BMP.
