= 39th Mountain Division (India) =

39th Indian Infantry Division
- Active: 14 July 1941–1945; 1966-date
- Country: (British Raj) British India; India
- Branch: British Indian Army; Indian Army
- Type: Infantry
- Size: Division
- Nickname: Dah Division
- Mottos: ‘Daring and Hardy’
- Engagements: World War II; Burma Campaign; Battle of Yenangyaung; Indo-Pakistani War of 1971

Commanders
- Notable commanders: Major General James Bruce Scott

39th Indian Infantry Division (originally the 1st Burma Division) was an infantry division of the Indian Army during World War II, which became a training division in 1943 after its recovery into India from Burma. The division was re-raised after independence and 39 Mountain Division is presently located in Palampur, Himachal Pradesh under XVI Corps.

== History ==
The 1st Burma Infantry Division was formed 14 July 1941 at Toungoo in Burma. The division was part of the British Burma Army.

On the outbreak of war, the division was commanded by Major-General James Bruce Scott. It consisted of the 1st and 2nd Burma Infantry Brigades, and the 13th Indian Infantry Brigade. Throughout the Japanese conquest of Burma, the division interchanged many units with its fellow Burma Corps component, 17th Indian Infantry Division. At various times the 7th Armoured Brigade, 16th Indian Infantry Brigade, 48th Indian Infantry Brigade, and 63rd Indian Infantry Brigade came under command of the division, though only the original three brigades finally entered India as part of the division at the end of the arduous retreat, reduced to fractions of their original strength.

The 1st Burma Division changed to an Indian formation at the end of the 1942 campaign. While the majority of the Burma Army was reconstituted elsewhere in India, the division headquarters was retained at the front.

The 39th division was soon re-roled as a light division with two infantry brigades and Mule and jeep transport companies. However this change happened more in name than in anything else as it never actually began to convert to an entirely mule and jeep based transport and supply system.

The decision to convert the division to a training role was undertaken in June 1943 after the poorly executed Arakan offensive when it was realised that the troops being sent into the field, both British and Indian, while not lacking conventional military fighting skills, lacked the necessary knowledge and training to operate in the Burmese jungle. The 39th was joined in its training role by the 14th Indian Infantry Division which had been the main operational unit during the Arakan offensive and had suffered badly both in terms of casualties and morale as a result.

Post World War II, the division was disbanded between January and March 1946 as part of the demobilisation policy.

== Formation ==
=== 106th Indian Infantry Brigade ===
- 2nd Battalion, Duke of Wellington's Regiment
- 2nd Battalion, 7th Rajput Regiment
- 1st Battalion, 9th Jat Regiment
- 1st Battalion, 8th Gurkha Rifles
- 5th Battalion, 19th Hyderabad Regiment
- 7th Battalion, 15th Punjab Regiment
- 9th Battalion, 16th Punjab Regiment
- 15th Battalion, 14th Punjab Regiment

=== 113th Indian Infantry Brigade ===
- 1st Battalion, 18th Royal Garhwal Rifles
- 2nd Battalion, King's Own Yorkshire Light Infantry
- 5th Battalion, 1st Punjab Regiment
- 2nd Battalion, 13th Frontier Force Rifles
- 29th Gurkha Rifles Training Battalion
- 7th Battalion, 9th Jat Regiment
- 7th Battalion, 12th Frontier Force Regiment
- 17/18th Combined Training Unit
- Indian State Forces Training Unit

=== Divisional troops ===
- 7th Battalion, 10th Baluch Regiment
- 2nd Battalion, Duke of Wellington's Regiment
- 24th Light Anti-Aircraft/Anti-Tank Regiment Royal Artillery
- 9th Field Regiment Royal Artillery
- 145th (Berkshire Yeomanry) Field Regiment, Royal Artillery
- Malerkotla Field Company, Indian State Forces
- 26th Field Company, Indian Engineers
- 82nd Field Company, Indian Engineers

== Assigned brigades ==
All these brigades were assigned or attached to the division at some time during World War II

=== Under command when Burma Division ===
- 1st Burma Infantry Brigade (July 1941 - May 1942)
- 2nd Burma Infantry Brigade (July 1942 - December 1942, March 1942 - April 1942)
- 13th Indian Infantry Brigade (July 1941 - February 1942, April 1942 - May 1942)
- 48th Indian Infantry Brigade (April 1942)
- 7th Armoured Brigade (April 1942)
- 63rd Indian Infantry Brigade (May 1942)
- Magforce (ad hoc brigade-sized combat force) (April 1942)

=== Attached when light division ===
- 106th Indian Infantry Brigade
- 113th Indian Infantry Brigade

=== Attached when a training division ===
- 106th Indian Infantry Brigade (June 1942 - March 1946)
- 113th Indian Infantry Brigade (June 1942 - March 1946)
- 115th Indian Infantry Brigade (September 1943 - March 1946)

== Post independence ==
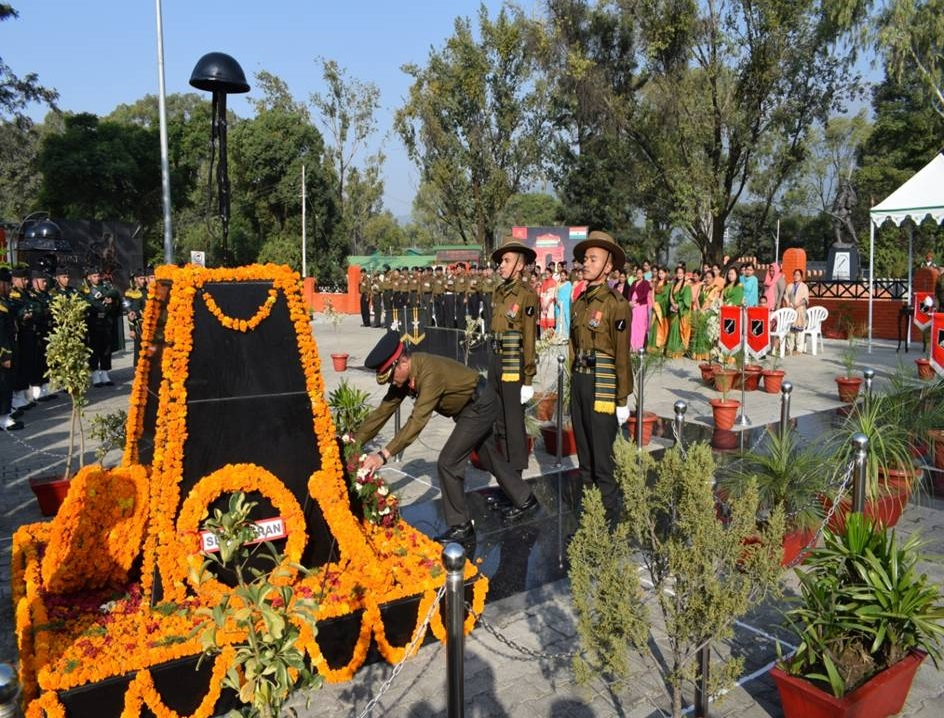
Dah Division celebrates 70th 'Infantry Day' at Palampur, Himachal Pradesh, October 2017

The 39 Infantry Division was re-raised at Jhansi under the command of Major General ML Thapan on 15 July 1966. At formation, the division had an independent parachute brigade and an artillery brigade. The 87 Infantry Brigade (Shakargarh Brigade) and 323 Infantry Brigade (Dalhousie Brigade) joined the division in January 1966. The Parachute Brigade was replaced by the 33 Infantry Brigade (Thanpir Brigade) in October 1967. The division moved from Jhansi to Yol, Himachal Pradesh in March 1970 and was converted to a mountain division in January 1986. The division was moved to Poonch and Rajouri border districts in 1994 following the rise of terrorism in the state of Jammu and Kashmir. It was withdrawn to its base in Palampur in Himachal Pradesh in 2009. The division presently has the following brigades -

- 33 Mountain Brigade at Dharamshala
- 87 Mountain Brigade at Udhampur
- 323 Mountain Brigade at Dalhousie Cantonment
- 39 Mountain Artillery Brigade at Alhilal

=== Operations ===
Indo-Pakistani War of 1971

The division was under the command of Major General BR Prabhu during the 1971 war. It was initially placed under the XV Corps in a defensive role. It then moved to I Corps in the Shakargarh sector. Its task was to move along the Mawa-Dehlra axis and capture Shakargarh. The division had shed two of its three integral brigades and was allotted 72 Infantry Brigade from 36 Infantry Division, 2 Independent Armoured Brigade (less one regiment) and one mechanised battalion. 33 Infantry Division was sent to reinforce Poonch and 323 Infantry Division to 'X Sector' west of Degh Nadi.

The order of battle of the division was -

- 87 Infantry Brigade (moved to 36 Division after 12 December 1971)
  - 3/9 Gorkha Rifles
- 72 Infantry Brigade (from 36 Infantry Division) (Brigadier JM Vohra)
  - 1 Mahar (from 115 Brigade of 36 Infantry Division)
  - 15 Grenadiers
  - 22 Punjab
  - 3 Sikh Light Infantry
- 2 Independent Armoured Brigade (Brigadier RN Thumby)
  - 1st Horse (Skinner's Horse)
  - 7 Light Cavalry
  - 14 Horse (Scinde Horse)
  - 1 Dogra (Mechanised)
  - 91 Independent Reconnaissance Squadron (from 14 Horse)
- 39 Artillery Brigade (Brigadier Gurbachan Singh)
  - 92 Field Regiment
  - 101 Field Regiment (Self Propelled)
  - 36 Light Regiment (less a battery)
  - 186 Light Regiment (less a battery)
  - 77 Medium Regiment (one battery)
  - 45 AD Regiment (one troop)

The divisional offensive started on the morning of 5 December 1971, with 92 Field Regiment knocking out the Pakistani Artillery Observation Post (OP) at Sukhmal. At night, 72 Infantry Brigade captured the Pakistani border posts. They faced heavy artillery fire, slowing the advance. 1 Dogra came in contact with the enemy at Harar Kalan on the noon of 7 December 1971. The battalion launched a frontal attack the same night, but faced heavy enemy fire leading to 25 killed and 65 wounded and the attack was called off. During the same time, 15 Grenadiers, 22 Punjab and 3 Sikh Light Infantry captured Khaira, Chak Amru and Parni respectively. The setback at Harar Kalan though affected the division’s speed of advance.

72 Infantry Brigade with better preparation and planning and supported well by the artillery subsequently attacked and captured Harar Kalan on the night of 10 December 1971. At the same time, 15 Grenadiers, 22 Punjab and 3 Sikh Light Infantry captured Harar Khurd, Shahbazpur and Munam respectively.

Because of the slow advance of the division compared to the 54 Infantry Division, there was a change in strategy and regrouping of forces. The division was assigned a defensive role in the Ramgarh-Samba gap. 87 Infantry Brigade, Headquarters 2 Independent Armoured Brigade and 1 Horse were moved to reinforce 36 Infantry Brigade. 72 Infantry Brigade and 7 Light Cavalry were moved to form the fourth brigade under 54 Infantry Division.

101 Field Regiment (Self Propelled) which had provided accurate and effective artillery fire during the offence was subsequently awarded the honour title Harar Kalan.

Operation Trident

January to March 1987.

Operation Rakshak I

The division was involved in counterinsurgency operations in South Kashmir between April 1993 and January 1994.

Operation Rakshak II

The troops of the division were inducted for counterinsurgency operations in Poonch and Rajouri in October 1998.

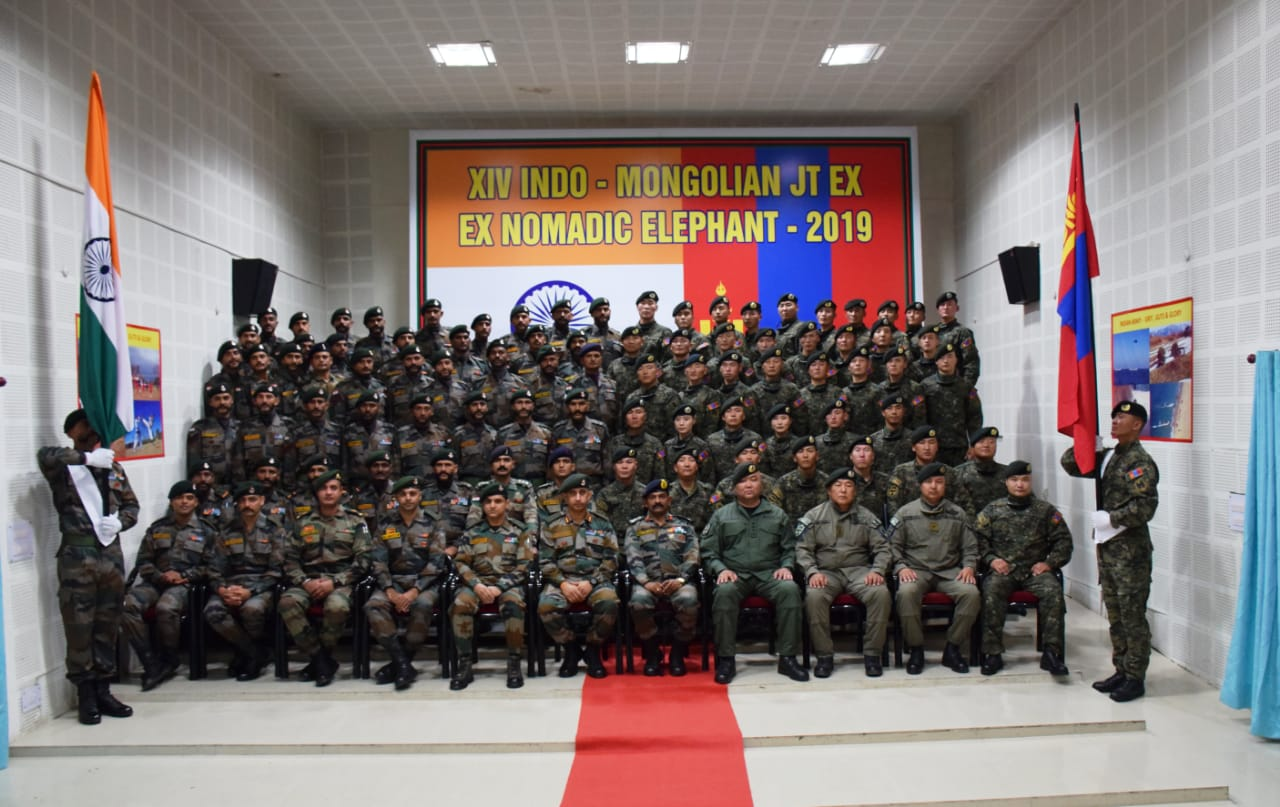
Exercise Nomadic Elephant 2019 between India and Mongolia at Bakloh, Himanchal Pradesh under the aegis of Dah Division, October 2019

Operation Vijay

The division was concentrated around Rajouri between May 1999 and December 2001.

Operation Parakram

The division was mobilised for the operation on 18 December 2001 in the Rajouri area.

Counter-terrorism operations

The division was deployed in Udhampur district between April 2002 and June 2003.

Line of Control deployment

The formation was deployed in counter-infiltration role at the Line of Control (LoC) between July 2003 and September 2009.

== Formation Sign ==
The present formation sign has a black background signifying an infantry division and a Dah - a sharp edged sword.

== Sources ==
- Kempton, Chris (2003). 'Loyalty & Honour' The Indian Army September 1939 - August 1947, Part I: Divisions. Milton Keynes: The Military Press. ISBN 0-85420-228-5.
