= 1915 Kachin Hills uprising =

Date	2 January – February 1915
Location	Kachin Hills, British Burma
Result	British victory

Belligerents
Kachin rebels Shan rebels	(United Kingdom of Great Britain and Ireland) British Empire: India; Burma

Commanders and leaders
Nga Po Thaik; Pawlum Kron Li †	(United Kingdom of Great Britain and Ireland) Herbert Raitt (United Kingdom of Great Britain and Ireland) C.T. Swan (United Kingdom of Great Britain and Ireland) A.W.H. Lee

Strength
300+ Kachins; 4 Shans	64th Pioneers; 139+ Gurkhas; Burma Military Police

Casualties and losses
Unknown	1+ dead 1+ wounded

The 1915 Kachin Hills uprising was an uprising Kachin villagers in the Kachin hills of British Burma from 2 January to February 1915. The rebellion had been agitated by four ethnic Shans. The rebellion would be crushed by British colonial troops, including those from India and by the 64th Pioneers, and the four Shans were hanged in September 1915.

== History ==
=== Background ===
The Kachin people are an ethnic group who continues to live in the Kachin Hills. Before the British conquest of Burma, the region was ruled by the Burmese Konbaung dynasty, who were highly centralized. The British would conquer upper Burma in 1885 following the Third Anglo-Burmese War, placing the Kachin Hills under British control. By 1915, Burma was ruled as a province of British India, with its capital in Rangoon. Before the start of World War I, a two-brigade garrison existed in Burma and were made up of British and Indian soldier, alongside the battalions of the Burma Military Police (BMP). The BMP was made up of men from Punjab and the hill tribes, and the BMP was tasked with maintaining order in remote areas of Burma.

For the Kachin, disaffection against the British grew, with intelligence reports expecting an attack on Myitkyina on 4 December 1914, although it didn't occur then. This disaffection was caused by four Shans - Nga Po Thaik, Nga Kyi, Nga Ni and Nga Se Bon - gaining influence over the Kachin of the Hukawng valley after showing off magic tricks to them, with most of them being superstitious. The Shans were led by Nga Po Thaik, who claimed to have once been an elephant in a past life. Nga Po Thaik then convinced most of the Hukawng valley Kachins to rebel after saying that the BMP had been withdrawn to fight in World War I. The Kachins were then equipped with guns and Dha swords.

=== Beginning ===
On 2 January 1915, a group of Kachins stole some buffaloes near the BMP post at Kamaign. Six Nepalese BMP sepoys, who were part of the Myitkyina BMP battalion, were then captured by the Kachins at Ichi after trying to recover the buffaloes. A larger BMP force led by officer Baker then clashed with a 300-Kachin strong stockade, where the BMP had one of their man killed and another one injured. Baker then withdrew from the stockade. For the Kachin, their victory in the Hukawng valley encouraged more Kachins to join their rebellion. The Shans then left the Hukawng Kachins for the Kachins at Wawang in the Mali Valley. The Mali Valley Kachins were led by Pawlum Kron Li, who decided to see how the rebellion developed before deciding to join in late January. His decision influenced the Kachins at Nmaizin Long to also remain neutral for the time.

Following this, BMP forces moved into rebel controlled territory and began shooting armed rebels, burning stockades, and seizing farm animals. As the rebellion continued, Indian soldiers were deployed to the Kachin hills to support BMP forces and the rebel area was split into two areas of operations. The area north of Myitkyina was then assigned to Lieutenant Colonel C.T. Swan of the 64th Pioneers, whilst the area of Kamaing and Mogaung were placed under Lieutenant Colonel A.W.H. Lee. Gurkha reinforcements also arrived to Myitkyina from Maymyo.

Herbet Raitt in 1920

=== Operations in the Hukawng valley and north of Myikyina ===
Over the course of the war, BMP forces faced tough fighting to difficult terrain. In late January, a column of men under Lee, including a force of Gurkhas, left Kamaing for Walapum with no opposition. In Walapum, the homes of villagers were burnt down. At the same time, a 112 Gurkhas and 63 BMPs left Kamaign and destroyed the Mawmwepum stockade before returning to Myitkyina. On 30 January, Conningham was ordered to join Swan in the north with his 139 Gurkhas.

In late January, the Kachins of Wawang began planning to join the rebellion. As they would have no supplies to fight a war, they decided to raid the Public Works Department food store in Shingboi (Shingbwiyang). However, the 64th Pioneers were camped near Shingboi and decided to attack the Wawang Kachins at night on 27 January. Their force of a hundred men reached Wawang at dawn and were met by gunfire from the Kachins. The 64th Pioneers then attacked a stockade near the village with a bayonet charge. The Kachins at the stockade retreated, although Pawlum Kron Li was shot by Major Bliss. The stockade and Wawang was then burnt, as the Kachins and Shans fled into the jungle.

In February, Herbert Raitt began directing operations against the Kachin rebels. Colonel Swan also decided to punish Warang and nearby villages for their dissidence. Swan led a column of men, supported by the 22nd Derajat Mountain Battery, to Darukha where he left a Gurkha garrison before heading to Wawang. At Wawang, homes of prominent villagers were shelled before infantry occupied and burn the village down again. The day after, two villages, including Lengatawang, were destroyed. The British administration in Burma decided to severely punish dissident groups as an example against the hill tribes.

=== End ===
By the end of February, the Kachins ceased all hostilities towards the British. The four Shans fled east into the Triangle zone, which was bounded by the Mali and Nmaikha rivers and was not administerred by the British. However, the Shans were seized and later handed over to British authorities by Kachins from Nkraun. They were then tied in Mandalay in September 1915, where they told the judge they had no connection to the rebellion and were only in the Kachin Hills to buy drugs. The Mandalay Sessions Judge however sentenced them to death and they were hanged.
