= 115th Indian Infantry Brigade =

115th Infantry Brigade
- Active: 1943– 1971–Present
- Country: British India; India
- Branch: British Indian Army; Indian Army
- Part of: 36th Infantry Division
- Garrison/HQ: Dhana, Madhya Pradesh (2001)
- Engagements: World War II

The 115th Indian Infantry Brigade is an infantry formation of the Indian Army. It was initially formed during World War II, in September 1943, as a training brigade of the 39th Indian Infantry Division.

Its composition included the 14th Gurkha Rifles Training Battalion, the 38th Gurkha Rifles Training Battalion, the 56th Gurkha Rifles Training Battalion, and the 710th Gurkha Rifles Training Battalion.

In 1971 it was part of the 36th Division. In the late 1980s the brigade took part in the Indian Peace Keeping Force in Sri Lanka. As of 2001, the brigade, as part of the reformed 36th Division, a Reorganised Army Plains Infantry Division (RAPID), was located at Dhana.

== See also ==
- List of Indian Army Brigades in World War II
