= 77 Field Regiment (India) =

- Active: 1966 – present
- Country: India
- Allegiance: India
- Branch: Indian Army
- Type: Artillery
- Size: Regiment
- Motto(s): Sarvatra, Izzat-O-Iqbal (Everywhere with Honour and Glory)
- Colors: Red & Navy Blue
- Anniversaries: 1 July – Raising Day

Insignia
- Abbreviation: 77 Fd Regt

77 Field Regiment is part of the Regiment of Artillery of the Indian Army.

== Formation and history ==
The regiment was raised on 1 July 1966 at Jhansi as 77 Medium Regiment. The first commanding officer was Lieutenant Colonel Harish Bahl. The batteries were christened as 771, 772 and 773 medium batteries. The regiment received its 130 mm field guns on 2 September 1966 and went on to use it during its first field exercise on 17 April 1967 and was declared Fit for War. The regiment has subsequently been converted to a field regiment.

== Class Composition ==
The regiment at formation had a fixed class composition of Brahmins, Rajputs and South Indian Classes. In 1999, the regiment was converted to a mixed class unit.

== Operations ==
The regiment has taken part in the following operations –

- Operation Cactus Lily – It took part in operations in Shakargarh sector and a battery, which was part of the divisional artillery of 39 Infantry Division saw action.
- Operation Trident
- Operation Rakshak I
- Operation Rakshak II
- Operation Meghdoot - Siachen Glacier
- Operation Snow Leopard

== Gallantry awards ==
The regiment has won the following gallantry awards–

- Sena Medal – 02
  - Havidar D Ramesh
  - Lance Naik Kausender Singh
- Chief of the Army staff Commendation cards – 07
- Vice Chief of the Army staff Commendation cards – 01
- General Officer Commanding-in-chief Commendation cards – 15

== See also ==
- List of artillery regiments of Indian Army
