= 99 Field Regiment (India) =

- Active: 1964 – present
- Country: India
- Allegiance: India
- Branch: Indian Army
- Type: Artillery
- Size: Regiment
- Nickname: The Double Niners
- Mottos: Sarvatra, Izzat-O-Iqbal (Everywhere with Honour and Glory)
- Colors: Red & Navy Blue
- Anniversaries: 15 April – Raising Day; 15 December – Battle Honour Day
- Battle honours: Sylhet

Insignia
- Abbreviation: 99 Fd Regt

99 Field Regiment is part of the Regiment of Artillery of the Indian Army.

== Formation and history ==
The regiment was raised as 99 Mountain Composite Regiment (Towed) on 15 April 1964 at Aurangabad. It was part of the new raisings for the mountain divisions following the reversal during Sino-Indian War of 1962. The first commanding officer was Lieutenant Colonel KN Channa.

At raising, the regiment was equipped with three batteries of American 75/24 pack howitzers and one battery of heavy mortars. On 1 February 1965, the regiment was re-organised as 99 Mountain Regiment with three batteries of 75/24 pack howitzers. The regiment presently consists of headquarters, 991, 992 and 993 field batteries.

== Class Composition ==
The regiment, at formation, had a mixed class composition of Sikhs and Ahirs in equal proportion (2:2). In 1965, after shedding one battery, the composition was changed to Sikhs and Ahirs in 2:1 proportion. On 1 March 1999, the regiment composition was changed to an all class regiment.

== Operations ==
The regiment has taken part in the following operations –

- Indo-Pakistani War of 1965 – Operation Ablaze and Operation Riddle
- Indo-Pakistani War of 1971 – During Operation Cactus Lily, the regiment saw action in the Eastern sector for the liberation of Bangladesh. 99 Mountain Regiment was part of 2 Mountain Artillery Brigade under 8 Mountain Division. Commanded by Lieutenant Colonel VP Bhatia and equipped with 75/24 howitzers, the regiment took part in the heli-borne operation to capture the important garrison city of Sylhet. The soldiers and guns of the unit were transported by helicopter amidst heavy enemy fire and played a significant part in the capture of Sylhet on 16 December 1971. For its gallantry, the regiment was awarded the honour title Sylhet by the then President of India Neelam Sanjiva Reddy in May 1982. The regiment was also awarded three Sena Medals and three mentioned in despatches during the war. During the operations, the regiment lost Major Chaman Lal during the battle for Zakiganj on 21 November 1971.
- Operation Trident –1987.
- Operation Falcon – 1987, 2003
- Operation Curb – 1988
- Operation Rakshak – Counter terrorist operations between 1990-1992 and 2001–2004.
- Operation Vyavashta – 1993
- Operation Meghdoot – (Siachen glacier) 1996-1998 and 2009–11.
- Operation Vijay – 1999.
- Operation Parakram – 2001–2.

== Gallantry awards ==
The regiment has won the following gallantry awards–

- Shaurya Chakra – Gunner (DMT) Lallawmzuala, while serving with 18 Rashtriya Rifles.
- Sena Medal – 4 (Captain Subhash Chander Kalra, Lieutenant VK Chaturvedi, Havildar Basti Ram)
- Mentioned in dispatches – 3 (Major Krishan Dev Segan, Major Chaman Lal (posthumous))
- Chief of Army Staff Commendation cards – 6
- Vice Chief of Army Staff Commendation cards – 6
- GOC-in-C Commendation cards – 29

== Motto ==
The motto of the regiment is 'निश्चय कर अपनी जीत करौं' (Nischay Kar Apni Jeet Karoon) which translates to And with determination, I will be Victorious.

== Notable Officers ==
- Lieutenant General VK Chaturvedi PVSM, AVSM, SM – Commissioned into the regiment and was awarded a Sena Medal during the 1971 war. He later commanded the regiment and retired as the Director General (Manpower Planning and Personnel Services) in 2010.

== See also ==
- List of artillery regiments of Indian Army
