= 4th Carnatic Battalion =

The 4th Carnatic Battalion could refer to:

- 64th Pioneers in 1770
- 63rd Palamcottah Light Infantry in 1769
