= Liu Fangwu =

- 劉放吾
- Born: April 17, 1898; Renyi Town, Guiyang County, Hunan, Qing China
- Died: June 29, 1994 (aged 96); Los Angeles, California, U.S.A
- Military career
- Allegiance: Republic of China
- Branch: (Republic of China (1912–1949)) National Revolutionary Army
- Service years: 1929–1954
- Rank: Major general
- Unit: Chinese Expeditionary Force
- Conflicts: Second Sino-Japanese War; Battle of Yenangyaung; Chinese Civil War

Chinese name
- Traditional Chinese: 劉放吾
- Simplified Chinese: 刘放吾
Transcriptions
Standard Mandarin
- Hanyu Pinyin: Liú Fàngwú

Liu Jishu
- Traditional Chinese: 劉繼樞
- Simplified Chinese: 刘继枢
Transcriptions
Standard Mandarin
- Hanyu Pinyin: Liú Jìshū

Buji
- Chinese: 不羁
Transcriptions
Standard Mandarin
- Hanyu Pinyin: Bùjī

Liu Fangwu (Chinese: 劉放吾; 17 April 1898 – 29 June 1994) was a Chinese Nationalist (KMT) general, a graduate of Whampoa Military Academy, best known for his leadership in the Battle of Yenangyaung.

== Biography ==
Liu was born Liu Jishu (Chinese: 劉繼樞) in Renyi Town of Guiyang County, Hunan, on April 17, 1898. He attended the Lanjia Joint Middle School (now Guiyang No. 1 High School). After graduating from Whampoa Military Academy, he enlisted in the National Revolutionary Army. In July 1942, he participated in the Battle of Yenangyaung led by Sun Li-jen in Burma, rescuing more than 7000 British soldiers and 500 American journalists and missionaries.

After the Chinese Civil War, he moved to Taiwan with his family. Liu retired in January 1954 and emigrated to Los Angeles in 1977.

In 1992, the former British Prime Minister Margaret Thatcher met with him and thanked him for saving the British army. On July 27, 1992, former US President George W. Bush wrote a thank-you letter to him.

Liu died of illness on June 29, 1994, in Los Angeles.

== Personal life ==
Liu married Liu Zhenru (Chinese: 柳振如); their son, Liu Weimin (Chinese: 劉偉民), is a Chinese-American entrepreneur.

== Television ==
It is said that the character Long Wenzhang (Chinese: 龍文章) of My Chief and My Regiment (Chinese: 我的團長我的團) is based on the real-life of Liu Fangwu.
