= 218 Medium Regiment (India) =

- Active: 1967 – present
- Country: India
- Allegiance: India
- Branch: Indian Army
- Type: Artillery
- Size: Regiment
- Mottos: Sarvatra, Izzat-O-Iqbal (Everywhere with Honour and Glory)
- Colors: Red & Navy Blue
- Anniversaries: 1 October – Raising Day
- Equipment: Haubits FH77 155 mm guns

Insignia
- Abbreviation: 218 Med Regt

218 Medium Regiment is part of the Regiment of Artillery of the Indian Army.

== Formation ==
The regiment was raised on 1 October 1967 at Dhrangadhra with Rajput troops. It consists of 2181, 2182 and 2183 medium batteries.

== Operations ==
The regiment has taken part in the following operations -

- Operation Cactus Lily – The regiment took part in the 1971 war in the western sector in the Barmer subsector. It was part of divisional artillery of 11 Infantry Division. 2183 Medium Battery, which was in support of 85 Infantry Brigade was the first to fire the opening salvo during the war in this sector. The guns were used for direct shooting of Pakistani bunkers in Gazi Camp and Kajlor on 4/5 December. 2181 Medium Battery was in support of 31 Infantry Brigade. It supported the attack of 15 Kumaon on Gadra City on 4/5 December 1971. The regiment saw action during the capture of the formation named ‘Apex’ on the night of 10/11 December. The unit lost Gunner Brij Raj Singh during the operations. The regiment won one Sena Medal and two Mentioned in dispatches.
- Operation Falcon – The regiment had two tenures, 1986–90 and 1994–96. During its first tenure, the Sumdorong Chu standoff took place in the Tawang sector of Arunachal Pradesh along the Sino-Indian border. In the winter of 1986–87, as part of the proactive Indian response to Chinese incursions into the Wangdung area of the Sumdorong Chu Valley, a battery of newly inducted Haubits FH77 guns (commonly known as the Bofors guns) of the 285 Medium Regiment was inducted into the Tawang sector of the Tezpur-based 4 Corps. After the crisis ended, it handed over its guns to 218 Medium Regiment in the same area. 218 Medium Regiment was officially declared as the first Bofors unit.
- Operation Parakram – 2001-2
- Operation Rakshak – 2009-11 – counter terrorist operations.
- Operation Rhino – 2014-17 – counter terrorist operations.

== Gallantry awards ==
- Sena Medal – Captain Shekhar Dutt
- Mentioned in dispatches – Havildar Jagat Narain Singh, Gunner (TA) Virender Pal Singh
- COAS Commendation Card – Colonel Sachin Gahlawat
- VCOAS Commendation Card – Naik Manish Kumar Sharma

== Achievements ==
- The regiment had the honour to participate in the Republic Day Parade in 1999 and 2001 with their Haubits FH77 155 mm guns.

== Battle cry ==
The battle cry of the regiment is वीर राजपूत सर्वत्र विजय (Veer Rajput Sarvatra Vijay) which translates to Brave Rajput, always victorious.

== Notable officers ==
- Captain Shekhar Dutt– was a Forward Observation Officer (FOO) in the regiment during the 1971 war. He was awarded the Sena Medal during this war. He went on to join the Indian Administrative Service and rose to be the Defence Secretary, Deputy National Security Advisor and 4th Governor of Chhattisgarh.

== See also ==
- List of artillery regiments of Indian Army
