= Alexander Thorneycroft =

British Army general

Major-General Alexander Thorneycroft CB
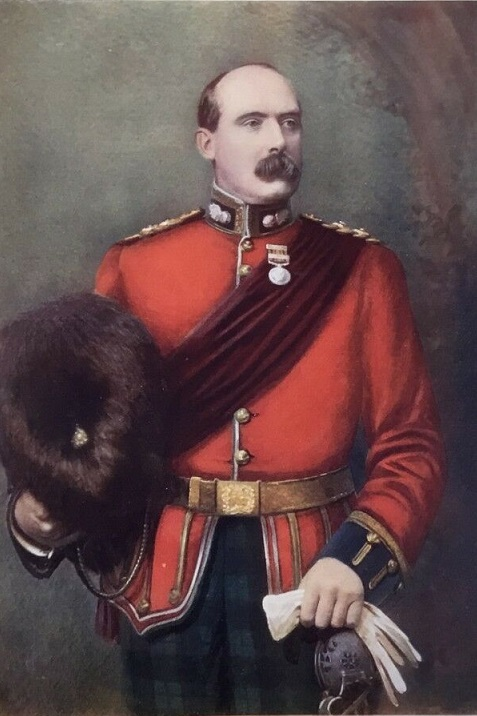
- Lieutenant-Colonel Alexander Thorneycroft, c. 1900
- Born: 19 January 1859; Wolverhampton
- Died: 4 November 1931 (aged 72); Reading, Berkshire
- Burial place: Earley St. Peter Churchyard, Earley, Berkshire
- Military career
- Allegiance: United Kingdom
- Branch: British Army
- Service years: 1879–1912
- Rank: Major-General
- Unit: Royal Scots Fusiliers
- Commands: South Midland Division; 14th Infantry Brigade; Thorneycroft Mounted Infantry
- Conflicts: Anglo-Zulu War; First Boer War; Second Boer War
- Awards: Companion of the Order of the Bath; Mentioned in Despatches

Major-General Alexander Whitelaw Thorneycroft, CB (19 January 1859 – 4 November 1931) was a senior British Army officer during the Second Boer War.

== Personal life ==
Thorneycroft was the son of Lieutenant Colonel Thomas Thorneycroft (1822–1903), of Tettenhall Towers, Wolverhampton, by his wife Jane Whitelaw (1824–1908). His father was a former High Sheriff of Staffordshire and Yeomanry officer, whose father George Benjamin Thorneycroft (1791–1851) was the first Mayor of Wolverhampton. His mother was daughter of Alexander Whitelaw, of Drumpark, and sister of the Conservative Member of Parliament (MP) for Glasgow Alexander Whitelaw.

== Military career ==
Thorneycroft was commissioned a second lieutenant in the Royal Scots Fusiliers on 22 February 1879, and served in the Anglo-Zulu War later the same year, followed by the operations against Sekukuni. Two years later, he served in the First Boer War of 1881, and took part in the defence of Pretoria, following which he was promoted to lieutenant on 1 July 1881. He was promoted to captain on 23 January 1887, to major on 1 July 1899, and received the brevet rank of lieutenant colonel on the same day.

Expecting military hostilities, Thorneycroft was one of several officers sent to South Africa to raise volunteer units shortly before the Second Boer War broke out in October 1899. He raised a corps of troopers, later known as the Thorneycroft's Mounted Infantry, which served in the early stages of the war, including in the campaign to relieve Ladysmith, which was under siege by troops from the Boer republics. In the Battle of Spion Kop in late January 1900, he was selected to lead the initial assault. Before dawn, the British forces had captured what they thought was the summit of the kop, or hill. The Boers, who actually held the higher ground, soon counter-attacked, swarming the British position. The higher ranking British officers were killed or mortally wounded, leaving Thorneycroft the most senior officer present. A British counterattack failed in the face of withering fire from the Boers, but Thorneycroft refused to allow any under his command to surrender. Not knowing that they actually had gained the upper hand over the course of the day, and running short on both water and ammunition, the British troops retreated under cover of dark. The battle at Spion Kop was considered a resounding defeat, but the British regrouped and were able to relieve Ladysmith four weeks later. Thorneycroft received a brevet promotion to lieutenant colonel and was appointed a Companion of the Order of the Bath in the April 1901 South Africa Honours list (the award was dated 29 November 1900). He stayed in South Africa throughout the war, which entered a phase of guerrilla warfare from late 1900. In his final despatch from South Africa in June 1902, Lord Kitchener, Commander-in-Chief of the forces during the latter part of the war, described Thorneycroft as "an absolutely reliable officer of great experience, common-sense and force of character." For his service in the later part of the war, Thorneycroft received a brevet promotion to colonel on 22 August 1902.

After the end of the war in June 1902, Thorneycroft was among a number of officers who left Cape Town on the SS Kildonan Castle in late July, arriving in Southampton the following month. Following his return, he was in November 1902 appointed assistant adjutant-general of the 7th Infantry Division, serving in Dublin, and received the substantive rank of colonel on 12 November 1902. He was promoted to temporary brigadier general and became commander of the 14th Infantry Brigade in November 1905 and, promoted in September 1909 to major general, and became general officer commanding (GOC) of the South Midland Division, Territorial Force (TF), in September 1911 before retiring from the army in July 1912.

== Later life ==
Thorneycroft married Rebekhah Frances Crozier (1862–1925) at St Marylebone, London, in 1903. They had no children.

Thorneycroft died at the age of 72 in 1931, at his home Blandford Lodge in Reading, Berkshire.

Military offices
Preceded by Herbert Raitt	GOC South Midland Division; 1911–1912	Succeeded by John Keir
