= 2nd Indian Infantry Brigade =

2nd Indian Infantry Brigade 16th Indian Infantry Brigade 116th Indian Infantry Brigade
- Active: 1939–1945
- Country: (British Raj) British India
- Allegiance: British Empire
- Branch: British Indian Army
- Type: Infantry
- Size: Brigade

Commanders
- Notable commanders: Sir Cyril Noyes

The 2nd Indian Infantry Brigade was an infantry brigade formation of the Indian Army during World War II. It was formed in Rawalpindi in September 1939. In October 1940, it was renamed 16th (Independent) Indian Infantry Brigade in November 1941, and left India for Burma. The brigade was caught in the Battle of Sittang Bridge where it suffered heavy losses. Instead of being reformed in September 1942, it was renamed yet again, this time to 116th Indian Infantry Brigade. Attached to the 39th Indian Infantry Division it now provided specialised jungle conversion training. An infantry battalion would spend from four to six months with the brigade, before being sent to the front to replace a tired battalion in one of the fighting divisions.

== Formation ==
=== 2nd Indian Infantry Brigade ===
- 1st Battalion, Devonshire Regiment from September 1940
- 2nd Battalion, 8th Punjab Regiment to March 1940
- 4th Battalion, 12th Frontier Force Regiment to September 1940
- 1st Battalion, East Yorkshire Regiment March to September 1940
- 2nd Battalion, 8th Punjab Regiment June to September 1940

=== 16th Indian Infantry Brigade ===
- 1st Battalion, 9th Jat Regiment October 1940 to March 1941
- 2nd Battalion, 1st Gurkha Rifles October 1940 to April 1941
- 4th Battalion, 12th Frontier Force Regiment October 1940 to March 1941
- 4th Battalion, 1st Gurkha Rifles July 1941 to October 1941
- 1st Battalion, 9th Jat Regiment October 1941 to July 1942
- 1st Battalion, 7th Gurkha Rifles October 1941 to December 1941
- 4th Battalion, 12th Frontier Force Regiment October 1941 to January 1942
- 7th Battalion, Burma Rifles December 1941 to January 1942
- 4th Battalion, Burma Rifles January 1942
- 1st Battalion, 7th Gurkha Rifles January to February 1942
- 2nd Battalion, Burma Rifles February 1942
- 2nd Battalion, King's Own Yorkshire Light Infantry February 1942
- 4th Battalion, 12th Frontier Force Regiment February to September 1942
- 4th Battalion, Burma Rifles February to March 1942
- 3rd Battalion, Burma Rifles February to March 1942
- 8th Battalion, Burma Rifles February to March 1942
- 2nd Battalion, Duke of Wellington's Regiment February to May 1942
- 7th Battalion, 10th Baluch Regiment February to May 1942
- 7th Battalion, 9th Jat Regiment July to September 1942

=== 116th Indian Infantry Brigade ===
- 7th Battalion, 9th Jat Regiment September 1942 to September 1943
- 7th Battalion, 14th Punjab Regiment December 1942 to August 1943
- 1st Battalion, Assam Regiment March to August 1943
- 1st Battalion, 8th Gurkha Rifles April to November 1943
- 2nd Battalion, 7th Rajput Regiment August to December 1943
- 2nd Battalion, 8th Punjab Regiment August 1943 to March 1944
- 6th Battalion, 11th Sikh Regiment August to December 1943
- 2nd Battalion, Ajmer Regiment IAS March to September 1944
- 5th Battalion, 3rd Madras Regiment March to September 1944
- 4th Battalion, Jammu and Kashmir Infantry IAS April to September 1944
- 2nd Battalion, Green Howards May to September 1944
- 1st Battalion, 3rd Madras Regiment September 1944 to January 1945
- 6th Battalion, 6th Rajputana Rifles September 1944 to April 1945
- 6th Battalion, 19th Hyderabad Regiment September 1944 to April 1945
- 16th Battalion, 6th Rajputana Rifles September 1944 to March 1945
- 1st Battalion, Cameronians October 1944 to March 1945
- 1st Battalion, Royal Warwickshire Regiment October 1944 to April 1945
- 8th Battalion, 6th Rajputana Rifles February to August 1945
- 1st Battalion, Gloucestershire Regiment April to August 1945
- 18th King Edward VII's Own Cavalry May to August 1945
- 1st Battalion, 7th Rajput Regiment June to August 1945

== See also ==
- List of Indian Army brigades in World War II
