= Burma Division =

The Burma Division was a static formation of the British Indian Army. It was created as part of the 1903 reforms of the Indian Army by Herbert Kitchener, 1st Earl Kitchener then Commander-in-Chief, India. The task of such formations was to oversee area brigades commanding Internal Security troops. The formation is best thought of as a provincial or district command rather than as an infantry division. The headquarters of the division was at Maymyo.

== Order of battle ==
At the start of World War I the division consisted of:

- Commander Major General T Pilcher
- Rangoon Brigade, Brigadier General Johnstone
  - 4th Battalion Worcestershire Regiment
  - 1st Battalion Royal Munster Fusiliers
  - 66th Punjabis
  - 79th Infantry
  - 89th Punjabis
  - 64th & 75th Batteries Royal Garrison Artillery
  - 22 Mountain Battery Royal Garrison Artillery
- Mandalay Brigade, Major General Herbert Raitt
  - 1st Battalion Border Regiment
  - 64th Pioneers
  - 80th Infantry
  - 91st Punjabis
  - 1/10th Gurkha Rifles

== See also ==
- List of Indian divisions in World War I

== Bibliography ==
- Haythornthwaite, Philip J. (1996). The World War One Source Book. London: Arms and Armour Press. ISBN 1-85409-351-7.
- Perry, F.W. (1993). Order of Battle of Divisions Part 5B. Indian Army Divisions. Newport: Ray Westlake Military Books. ISBN 1-871167-23-X.
