= 92 Medium Regiment (India) =

Indian Army artillery unit

- Active: 1963 – present
- Country: India
- Allegiance: India
- Branch: Indian Army
- Type: Artillery
- Size: Regiment
- Motto(s): Sarvatra, Izzat-O-Iqbal (Everywhere with Honour and Glory).
- Colors: Red & Navy Blue
- Anniversaries: 23 March – Raising Day
- Equipment: 130 mm M46A guns

Insignia
- Abbreviation: 92 Med Regt

92 Medium Regiment is part of the Regiment of Artillery of the Indian Army.

== Formation ==
The regiment was raised on 23 March 1963 at Ambala as 92 Mountain Composite Regiment. Lieutenant Colonel Sukhwant Singh was first commanding officer and was the only regiment which was equipped with Italian Pack howitzers. The unit was subsequently converted into a field regiment and is now a medium regiment.

== Composition ==
The Regiment was raised as a pure Sikh regiment.

== Operations ==
The Regiment has taken part in the following operations –

- Indo-Pakistani War of 1965 (Operation Riddle) – Second Lieutenant Ujagar Singh Rana was awarded the Sena Medal for gallantry in the Khemkaran sector. The regiment lost Captain PM Hashim, Second Lieutenant Padam Nath, Jemadar Teja Singh, Naik Milkha Singh and Lance Naik Balbir Singh during the operations.
- Indo-Pakistani War of 1971 (Operation Cactus Lily) - The regiment was part of the divisional artillery at Shakargarh sector. The Regiment was part of the divisional offensive, which started on a good note when on the morning of 5 December 1971, the guns of the unit knocked out the Pakistani Artillery Observation Post (OP) at Sukhmal.
- Operation Blue Star
- Operation Rakshak – The Regiment took part in counter insurgency operations in 1989.
- Operation Hifazat – The Regiment took part in counter insurgency operations in Northeast India between 1993 and 1995.
- Operation Vijay
- Operation Sahayata in 2001.
- Operation Meghdoot – The Regiment was posted in the highest battlefield in the world.
- Operation Zafran.
- Operation Rakshak

== Honours and achievements ==
- The unit has been awarded with –
  - 3 Sena medals
  - 14 COAS Commendation Cards
  - 2 VCOAS Commendation Cards
  - 14 GOC-in-C Commendation Cards
- Lieutenant General Ranjit Singh Nagra PVSM, VSM and bar was commissioned into the unit and went on to command it. He became the Director General Artillery at Army Headquarters in 2002.

== See also ==
- List of artillery regiments of Indian Army
