= 2nd Burma Infantry Brigade =

- Active: 1939–1943
- Country: British Burma
- Allegiance: British Crown
- Branch: British Burma Army
- Size: Brigade
- Engagements: Burma Campaign

Commanders
- Notable commanders: Brigadier AJH Bourke

The 2nd Burma Infantry Brigade was an Infantry formation of the Burma Army during World War II. It was formed in July 1941. The Brigade was then disbanded in June 1942, and reformed in October 1942, to command battalions of the newly formed Burma Regiment. It was disbanded once again in November 1943. During this time it served with the 1st Burma Division July 1941 to January 1942, the 17th Indian Infantry Division January to March 1942. It then returned to 1st Burma Division.

== Formation ==
These units served with the brigade.

- 2nd Battalion, Burma Rifles
- 4th Battalion, Burma Rifles
- 6th Battalion, Burma Rifles
- 8th Battalion, Burma Rifles
- Tenasserim Battalion, Burma Auxiliary Force
- 1st Battalion, 7th Gurkha Rifles
- 4th Battalion, 12th Frontier Force Regiment
- 3rd Battalion, Burma Rifles
- 7th Battalion, Burma Rifles
- 7th Battalion, 10th Baluch Regiment
- 5th Battalion, 1st Punjab Regiment
- 3rd Battalion, Burma Regiment
- 4th Battalion, Burma Regiment
- 6th Battalion, Burma Regiment

== See also ==
- List of Indian Army Brigades in World War II
