= John Anstice =

British Army general

Brigadier John Anstice DSO*
- Born: 25 October 1897; Prestwick, Ayrshire, Scotland
- Died: 10 February 1970 (aged 72); Colchester district, Essex, England
- Military career
- Allegiance: United Kingdom
- Branch: British Army
- Service years: 1916–1949
- Rank: Brigadier
- Service number: 10696
- Units: Royal Tank Regiment; 5th Royal Inniskilling Dragoon Guards
- Commands: 5th Royal Inniskilling Dragoon Guards; 30th Armoured Brigade; 7th Armoured Brigade; 8th Armoured Brigade
- Conflicts: World War I World War II: Battle of France; Burma campaign; Battle of Yenangyaung
- Awards: Companion of the Distinguished Service Order & Bar; Mentioned in dispatches

Brigadier John Henry Anstice DSO & Bar (25 October 1897 – 10 February 1970) was a British Army officer who commanded numerous brigades during World War II.

== Military career ==
Anstice was commissioned into the Royal Tank Corps on 7 April 1916 and from August that year he saw service in France and Belgium until the end of the First World War. In October 1922, he was transferred to the 5th Battalion Royal Inniskilling Dragoon Guards. Between January 1934 and September 1937, Anstice was adjutant of the Lanarkshire Yeomanry, a Scots Territorial Army unit. In 1939, he returned to the 5th Royal Inniskilling Dragoon Guards, this time as Commanding Officer, taking the unit to France.

In 1940, Anstice was appointed commander of 30th Armoured Brigade before transferring to command the 7th Armoured Brigade in 1941. As part of the Persia and Iraq Command, Brigadier Anstice commanded the Brigade in Egypt, Ceylon, Burma, India, Iraq, Palestine and Syria.

In 1944, he transferred again to command 8th Armoured Brigade. Later that year, he was made Head Liaison Officer at Headquarters, 21st Army Group in Northwest Europe and then he became a General Staff Officer for Home Forces.

Although he had commanded several brigades, this had been as a temporary brigadier; his substantive rank had been colonel. On 29 August 1948, he was promoted to brigadier. Anstice retired on 2 August 1949.

His elder daughter Sally Ann Wemyss Anstice (died 2015), former wife of Colonel Fikret Jemal (died 2018), married second Henry Pelham-Clinton-Hope, 9th Duke of Newcastle-under-Lyne in 1959.
