= 63rd Indian Infantry Brigade =

- Active: 1942–1945
- Country: (British Raj) British India
- Allegiance: British Empire
- Branch: British Indian Army
- Type: Infantry
- Size: Brigade
- Engagements: Burma Campaign

Commanders
- Notable commanders: J Wickham; A E Barlow; A E Cumming; G W S Burton; MR Smeeton

The 63rd Indian Infantry Brigade was an infantry brigade formation of the Indian Army during World War II. It was formed in January 1942, at Jhansi in India and was assigned to the 23rd Indian Infantry Division and served in the Burma Campaign. In March 1942, it was reassigned to the 17th Indian Infantry Division with whom it remained for the rest of the war apart from in May 1942, when it was attached to the 39th Indian Infantry Division.

== Formation ==
- 1st Battalion, 11th Sikh Regiment January to August 1942
- 1st Battalion, 10th Gurkha Rifles January to August 1945
- 2nd Battalion, 13th Frontier Force Rifles February to July 1942
- 5th Battalion, 17th Dogra Regiment March to June 1942
- 1st Battalion, Gloucestershire Regiment June 1942 to June 1943
- 1st Battalion, 3rd Gurkha Rifles June 1942 to August 1944
- 7th Battalion, 10th Baluch Regiment January to August 1943 and August 1944 to August 1945
- 1st Battalion, 4th Gurkha Rifles September 1943 to April 1944 and July to August 1944
- 1st Battalion, 16th Punjab Regiment October to December 1943
- 4th Battalion, 12th Frontier Force Regiment March 1944
- 9th Battalion, Border Regiment August 1944 to August 1945

== See also ==
- List of Indian Army Brigades in World War II
