= 13th Indian Infantry Brigade =

- Active: 1939–1945
- Country: British India
- Allegiance: British Crown
- Branch: British Indian Army
- Size: Brigade

The 13th Indian Infantry Brigade was an Infantry formation of the Indian Army during World War II. The brigade was formed in October 1940, at Campbellpore and assigned to the 7th Indian Infantry Division. It was transferred to the 1st Burma Division in July 1941, and after the withdrawal to India renamed the 113th Indian Infantry Brigade in June 1942. In August 1943, the brigade became a dedicated jungle warfare training brigade until the end of the war.

== Formation ==
=== 13th Indian Infantry Brigade ===
- 1st Battalion, 18th Royal Garhwal Rifles October 1940 to June 1942
- 2nd Battalion, 7th Rajput Regiment October 1940 to March 1942
- 5th Battalion, 1st Punjab Regiment October 1940 to March 1942
- 1st Battalion, Royal Inniskilling Fusiliers April to June 1942
- 5th Battalion, 1st Punjab Regiment April to June 1942
- 12th Battalion, Burma Rifles April to May 1942

=== 113th Indian Infantry Brigade ===
- 1st Battalion, 18th Royal Garhwal Rifles June 1942 to August 1943
- 2nd Battalion, King's Own Yorkshire Light Infantry June 1942 to July 1943
- 5th Battalion, 1st Punjab Regiment June 1942 to August 1943
- 2nd Battalion, 13th Frontier Force Rifles April to August 1943
- 29th Gurkha Rifles Training Battalion from August 1943
- 7th Battalion, 9th Jat Regiment from August 1943
- 7th Battalion, 12th Frontier Force Regiment from September 1943
- 17/18 Combined Training Unit from October 1943
- Indian State Forces Training Unit From December 1943

== See also ==
- List of Indian Army Brigades in World War II
