= 1st Burma Infantry Brigade =

- Active: 1939–1945
- Country: British Burma
- Allegiance: British Crown
- Branch: British Burma Army
- Size: Brigade
- Engagements: Burma Campaign

Commanders
- Notable commanders: Brigadier GAL Farwell

The 1st Burma Infantry Brigade was an Infantry formation of the British Burma Army during World War II. It was formed in July 1941, when it was converted from the Maymyo Infantry Brigade Area and assigned to the 1st Burma Infantry Division. In June 1942, it was redesignated 106th Indian Infantry Brigade and became part of the British Indian Army.

== Formation ==
These units served with the brigade.

- 1st Battalion, Burma Rifles
- 5th Battalion, Burma Rifles
- 2nd Battalion, King's Own Yorkshire Light Infantry
- 2nd Battalion, Burma Rifles
- 2nd Battalion, 7th Rajput Regiment
- 1st Battalion, Cameronians (Scottish Rifles)
- 7th Battalion, Burma Rifles
- 12th Battalion, Burma Rifles
- 5th Battalion, 1st Punjab Regiment
- 1st Battalion, 4th Gurkha Rifles
