= 48th Indian Infantry Brigade =

48th Infantry Brigade
- Active: 1941–present
- Country: British India, India
- Branch: Indian Army
- Part of: 7th Infantry Division
- Engagements: Burma Campaign, Occupation of Goa, 1962 Sino-Indian War

Commanders
- Notable commanders: Brigadier T R Henry; Colonel G L Blight

The 48th Infantry Brigade, was raised as the 48 Indian Infantry Brigade, in October 1941, at Secunderabad, India. After an initial tenure with 19th Indian Infantry Division, it was transferred to the 17th Indian Infantry Division. In World War II it participated in the Burma campaign and in April 1942 was attached to 1st Burma Division. After the war the brigade returned to India as an independent brigade, and was located at Dhond in August 1947. After India gained Independence in 1947, 48 Indian Infantry Brigade was re-designated as 48 Infantry Brigade. Since then 48 infantry brigade has seen action Goa in 1961, as part of 17 Infantry Division; in the 1962 War in Kameng Frontier Division, Arunachal Pradesh, as part of 4th Infantry Division; and in the 1971 war, as part of 7th Infantry Division. Since the 1970s, 48 Infantry Brigade has been located in Ferozpur, Punjab, as part of 7 Infantry Division.

== World War II ==
During the war the following Units were under the Brigade:

- 1st Battalion, 3rd Gurkha Rifles October 1941 to June 1942
- 1st Battalion, 4th Gurkha Rifles October 1941 to March 1943
- 2nd Battalion, 5th Gurkha Rifles May 1943 to September 1944
- 1st Battalion, 7th Gurkha Rifles February to August 1945
- 1st Battalion, 10th Gurkha Rifles April 1942
- 5th Battalion, 17th Dogra Regiment February to March 1942
- 8th Battalion, Burma Rifles February 1942
- 3rd Battalion, Burma Rifles February 1942
- 1st Battalion, Cameronians (Scottish Rifles) March to April 1942
- 4th Battalion, 12th Frontier Force Regiment January to October 1943 and March 1944 and January to August 1945
- 9th Battalion, Border Regiment July 1943 to August 1944
- 1st Battalion, West Yorkshire Regiment August 1944 to August 1945

== 1962 War ==
Following the Chinese offensive on 20 October 1962, the 48 Infantry Brigade was rushed from the plains to reinforce 4 Infantry Division (Dirang Dzong), defenses in Kameng. 4 Corps Commander was Lt General BM Kaul, and the GOC 4 Infantry Division was Major General Pathania. The following units served under the brigade during the war: 1st Battalion the Madras Regiment, 1 Sikh LI, 5 Guards, and troop 7 Cavalry (light tanks), 377 Field Company(engineers). On 19 November, just when the battle of Bomdila was unraveling, 3 Jammu & Kashmir Rifles (Lieutenant Colonel Gurdial Singh) and 22 Mountain Regiment, 6/8 Gorkha Rifles and 67 Brigade joined the brigade. The Brigade reached Bomdila without its full complement of weapons, equipment and men. Every thing was in short supply. There was just 50 rounds of 1st line ammunition for every rifle. The Brigade lacked supporting weapons, including according to its commander, "3" mortars, digging tools, barbed wire, mines, or even machetes to clear the jungle". The Commander of 48 Infantry Brigade was Gurbux Singh, who at the age of 94, recalling the battle of Bomdila, said like many veterans of that war, that "The war saw a failure of military and political leadership of the country. Our intelligence, too, was not very good... In any case I don't see why we are opening these old wounds. Why are we wallowing in our defeat. It was a bad show, we should forget it and move on".

== See also ==
- List of Indian Army Brigades in World War II
