= Herbert Raitt =

British Army officer

Major-General Sir Herbert Raitt KCIE CB
- Raitt in 1920
- Born: August 1858; Kensington, London, England
- Died: 8 November 1935 (aged 77); Folkestone, Kent, England
- Military career
- Allegiance: United Kingdom
- Branch: British Army
- Rank: Major-General
- Commands: Burma Division; Mandalay Brigade; South Midland Division; 1st Battalion South Staffordshire Regiment
- Conflicts: Anglo-Zulu War; Second Boer War; First World War; 1915 Kachin Hills uprising
- Awards: Knight Commander of the Indian Empire; Companion of the Order of the Bath

Major-General Sir Herbert Aveling Raitt, KCIE, CB (August 1858 – 8 November 1935) was a senior British Army officer.

== Military career ==
Raitt was commissioned into the 80th Regiment of Foot (later the South Staffordshire Regiment) on 27 March 1878, and saw action in the Anglo-Zulu War in 1879, following which he was promoted to lieutenant on 9 July 1897. He was made an adjutant on 2 February 1881 and promoted to captain on 26 January 1884, and served in the Bechuanaland Expedition under Sir Charles Warren in 1885, commanding a troop of the 3rd Mounted Rifles (Diamond Fields Horse). Promotion to major followed on 12 February 1896.

Raitt was appointed second-in-command of the 1st Battalion, South Staffordshire Regiment, on 10 March 1900, and left Southampton later the same month on the SS Briton to take command of the battalion for service in South Africa during the Second Boer War.

He was promoted to colonel on 22 February 1907. He became the first general officer commanding (GOC) of the South Midland Division, part of the newly created Territorial Force (TF), on 1 April 1908, before being promoted to major general in September 1912 and sent out to India as commander of the Mandalay Brigade in May 1913.

He went on to be General Officer Commanding the Burma Division in October 1914 and led the response to the Kachin Rising of January and February 1915 before retiring in November 1918.

In 1919, he was appointed KCIE. He died in Folkestone, Kent on 8 November 1935.

Military offices
| New command | GOC South Midland Division; 1908–1911 | Succeeded by Alexander Thorneycroft |
