= Dhana =

- Census town
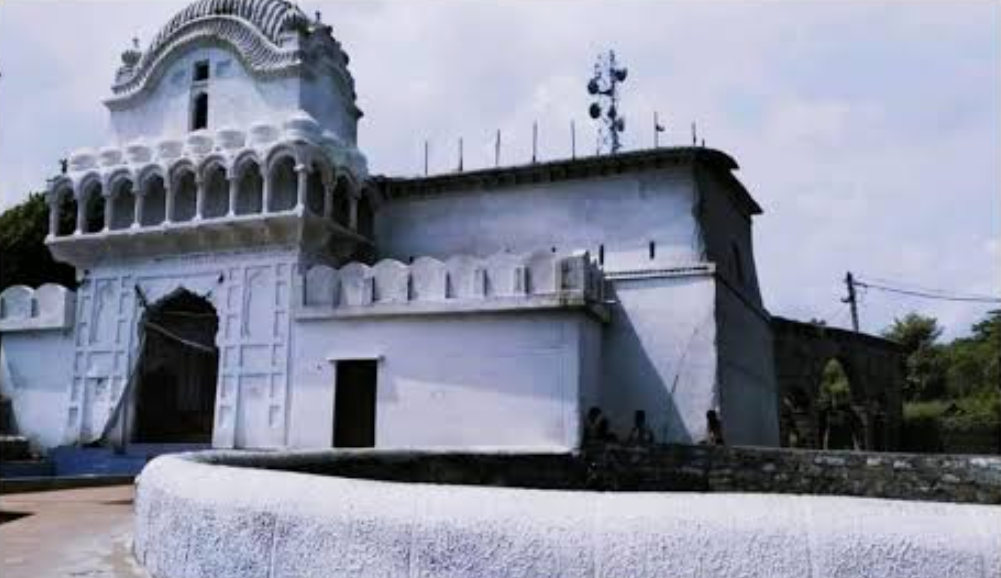
- Dhana Haweli

- Location in Madhya Pradesh, India Dhana (India)
- Coordinates: 23.747°N 78.863°E
- Country: India
- State: Madhya Pradesh
- District: Saugor
- Founder: aman upadhyay
- Elevation: 513 m (1,683 ft)

Population (2011)
  - Total: 9,677

Languages
  - Official: Hindi
- Time zone: UTC+5:30 (IST)
- Postal code: 470228
- ISO 3166 code: IN-MP
- Vehicle registration: MP 15

Dhana is a census town in Sagar district in the state of Madhya Pradesh, India. Dhana town is located 20 km away from Sagar city.

== Geography ==
Dhana is located on 23.74°N 78.86°E. It has an average elevation of 508 metres (1669 feet).

== History ==
Dhana was an estate of Pathak Brahmins. The Pathak rulers of Dhana came from Prayagraj as Rajpurohits. Under Maratha dominion, the Pathak family saw a phenomenal rise and were made rulers of this state with responsibility of one thousand foot soldiers which gave them the title of Hazari.

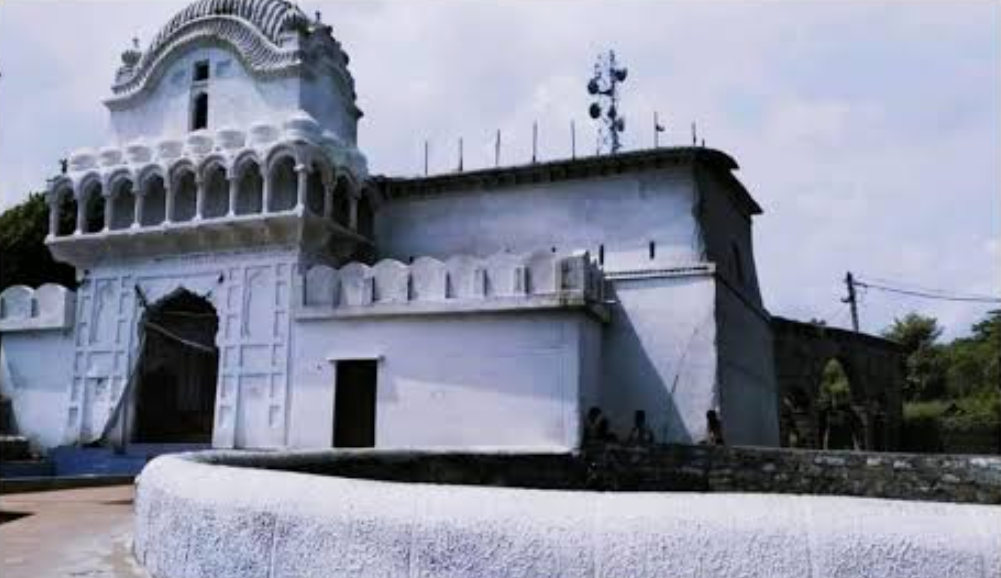
Dhana Haveli of Hazari Pathak rulers

Hazari (Pathak) rulers also built a strong fortress for their security in Dhana.

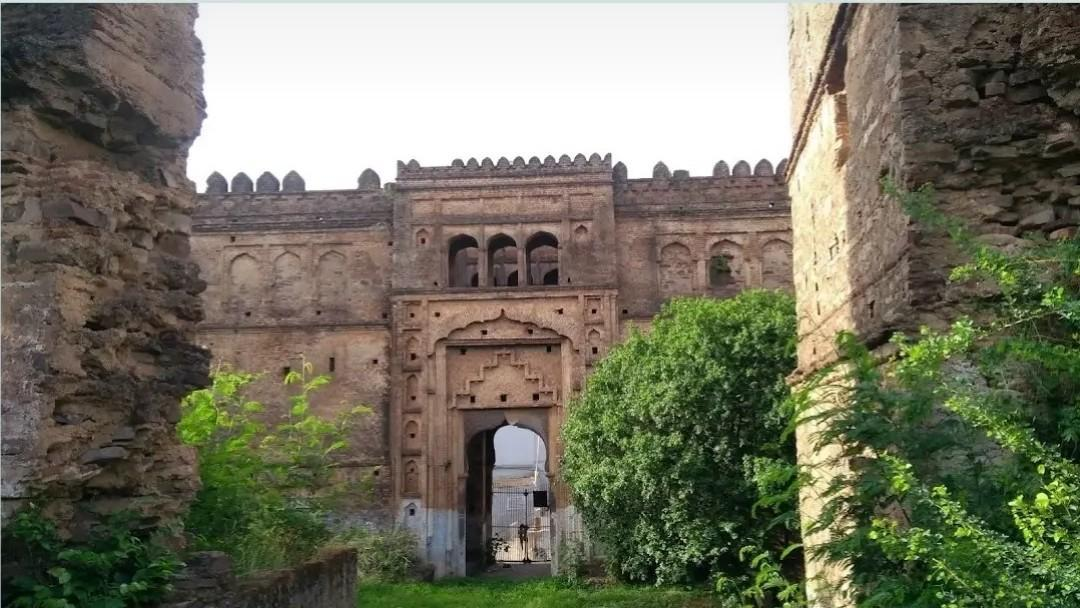
Fort of Hazari Pathak rulers in Dhana

== Demographics ==
As of 2001 India census, Dhana had a population of 10,295. Males constitute 61% of the population and females 39%.

== Dhana Airstrip ==
The Dhana Airstrip is located in Dhana. It is near to Sagar, Damoh, Khurai and Bina. Dhana Airport is the home base of Chimes Aviation Academy (CAA).
