= 64th Pioneers =

- Active: 1758-1922
- Country: Indian Empire
- Branch: Army
- Type: Infantry
- Part of: Madras Army (to 1895); Madras Command
- Colors: Red; faced orange, 1882 yellow, 1895 white
- Engagements: Carnatic Wars; Third Anglo-Mysore War; Boxer Rebellion; Second Anglo-Maratha War; World War I

The 64th Pioneers was a regiment of the British Indian Army. Originally serving as regular infantry it evolved into a specialist military pioneer unit performing engineering and construction tasks.

== History ==
The 64th Pioneers could trace their origins to 1758, when they were the 5th Battalion Coast Sepoys. Over the years the regiment was known by a number of different titles the 5th Carnatic Battalion 1769–1770, the 4th Carnatic Battalion 1770–1784, the 4th Madras Battalion 1784–1796, 1st Battalion, 4th Madras Native Infantry 1796–1824, the 4th Madras Native Infantry 1824–1883, the 4th Madras Native Infantry (Pioneers) 1883–1901, the 4th Madras Infantry (Pioneers) 1901–1903 and finally after the Kitchener reforms of the Indian Army when the names of the presidencies were dropped the 64th Pioneers.

During World War I the regiment was part of the Mandalay Brigade in the Burma Division. After World War I the Indian Government reformed the army again moving from single battalion regiments to multi battalion regiments. Following these reforms the 64th Pioneers became the 2nd Battalion, 3rd Madras Pioneers in 1922, and then in 1929 they joined the Corps of Madras Pioneers. The regiment was finally disbanded for economic reasons in 1933.

== Campaigns ==
- Carnatic Wars
- Second Anglo-Mysore War
  - Battle of Sholinghur
- Second Anglo-Maratha War
  - Battle of Assaye
- Second Afghan War
- World War I
