= Burma Frontier Force =

Paramilitary police force

The Burma Frontier Force was a paramilitary police force in British Burma. It was created in 1937 by the Burma Frontier Force Act (Burma Act I of 1937), when Burma was detached from British India. It was formed from battalions of the Burma Military Police. The Force was led by an Inspector-General, Frontier Force, appointed by the Governor of Burma.

After the fall of Burma, legislation was passed to make Force part of the Burmese Army and subject to the Burma Army Act.

In 1942, a mounted column of the Burma Frontier Force, under the command of Captain Arthur Sandeman (seconded from the Central India Horse) led a mounted infantry column. Near Toungoo airfield in central Burma the 60-man mounted patrol mistook Japanese troops for Chinese ones and closed with them before realizing their mistake. Most of the patrol (including Sandeman) were killed in what was probably the last cavalry charge by a force under the command of the British crown.
