= Commendation Card (Indian Army) =

Commendation Cards - Indian Army
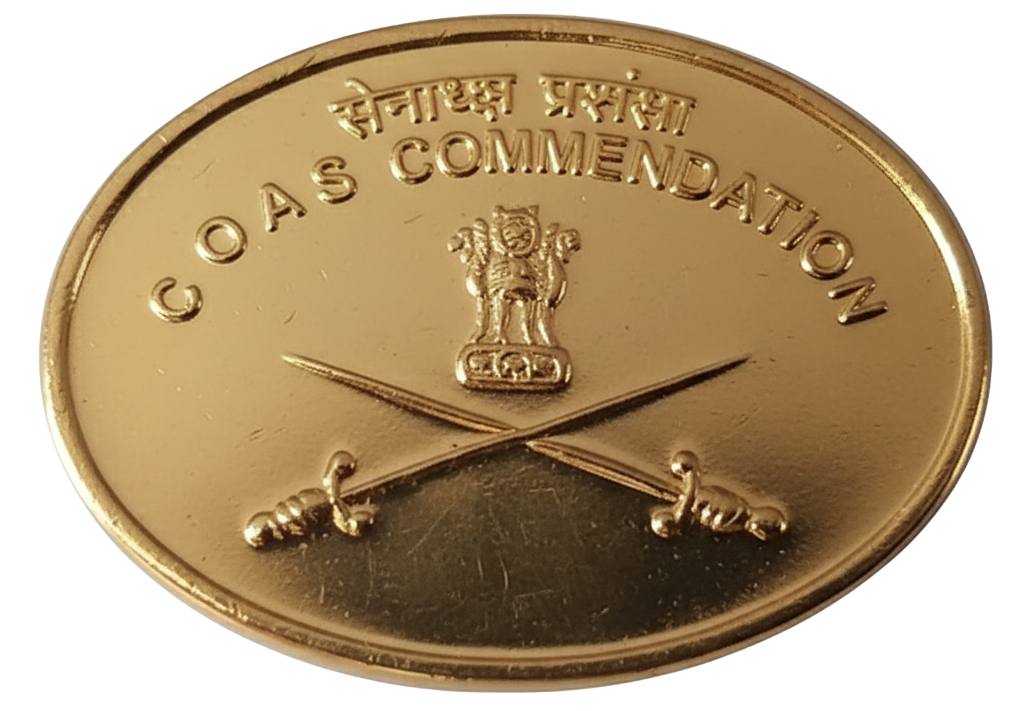
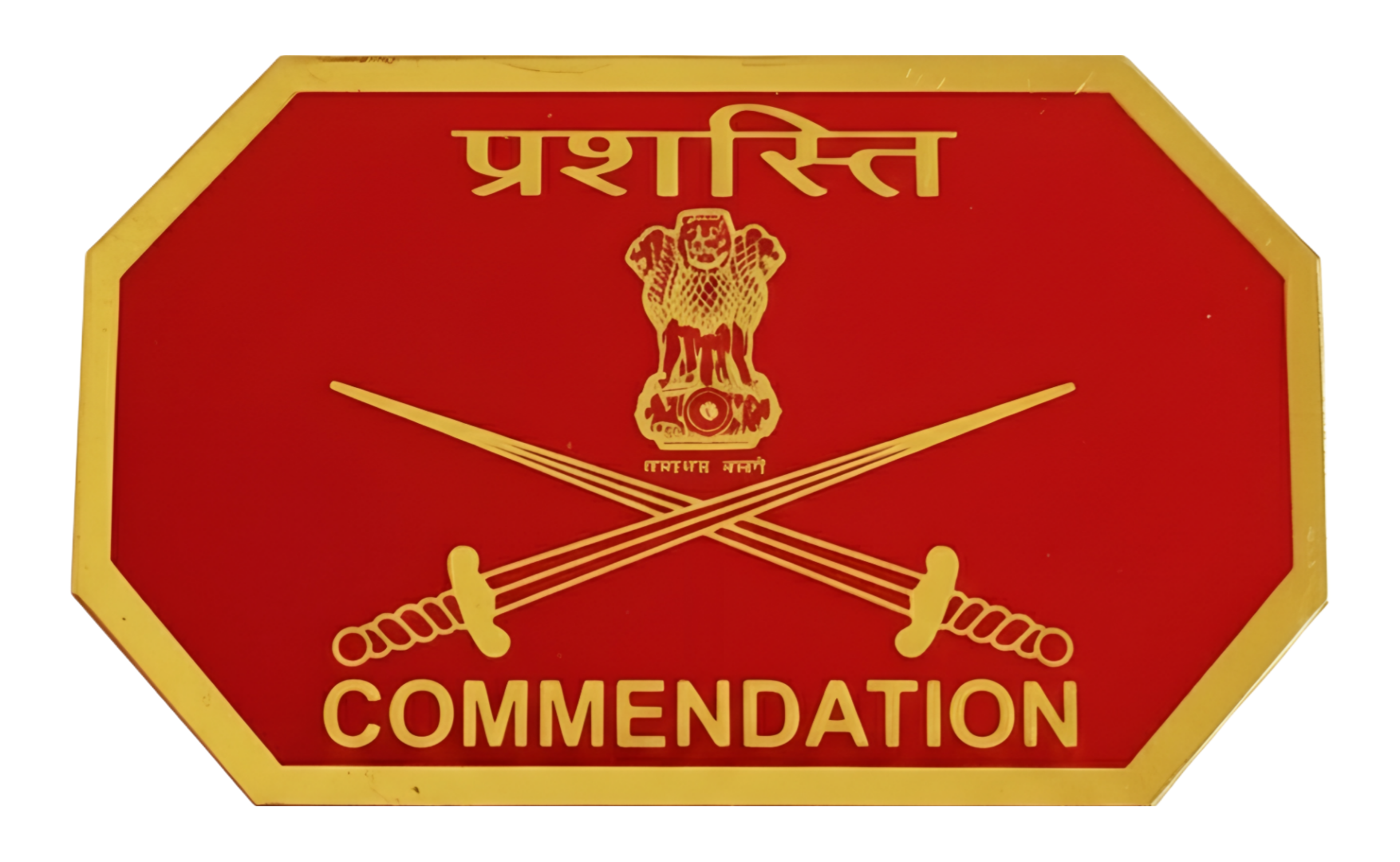
- COAS Commendation Army Commander Commendation
- Type: Military Award
- Country: India
- Presented by: Chief of Army Staff, Army Commanders
- Status: Active
- Related: CDS Commendation Card; CNS Commendation Card; CAS Commendation Card

The Commendation Cards of the Indian Army are awarded by the Chief of the Army Staff (COAS) or General Officer Commanding-in Chiefs (GOC-in-C) of the Indian Army for acts of gallantry, distinguished service, or devotion to duty.

== Criteria ==
The criteria for the award are as per Army Order 54/77–

1. The Chief of the Army Staff has approved of the award of Commendation Cards for gallantry and distinguished service.

2. The Commendation Card will be awarded for individual acts of gallantry or distinguished service or devotion to duty performed either in operation or non-operational areas which are not of a sufficiently high order to qualify for a higher gallantry award or for which the higher award is inappropriate.

3. The award will be for a specific act of bravery or distinguished service or special service.

4. The award will not be made posthumously.

5. All ranks of the Army and civilian personnel working under the supervision, direction and control of the Army are eligible for the award.

6. The names of the recipients will be published in Army Orders on the authority of which necessary Part II Orders will be issued. In this connection the unit concerned will be responsible for taking action as under:-

(a) Initiating casualty return in respect of officers for publication in the Part II orders,

(b) publishing Part II Orders in respect of JCOs/OR/NCs(E) serving in non-operational areas; and

(c) forwarding casualty return to Record Office in respect of JCOs/OR/NCs(E) serving in concessional/operational areas for issue of Part II Orders.

== Types of Badges ==
There are two types of Commendation Badges –

- (a) COAS Commendation Badges, which is awarded by the Chief of the Army Staff.
- (b) Army Commander Commendation, which can be awarded by officers of Commander-in-Chief Grade. This includes the Vice Chief of the Army Staff, General officer commanding-in-chiefs of the six operational commands and the Army Training Command.

If a Commendation Badge is awarded more than once, it will be denoted by a star on the badge. For example, a badge awarded for the second time will have a single star. There can be a maximum of three stars will be permitted in each of the Commendation Badges. Similar badges exist for the Indian Navy and Indian Air Force. The Chief of Defence Staff also issues commendation cards since 2020, replacing those issued by the Chief of Integrated Defence Staff.

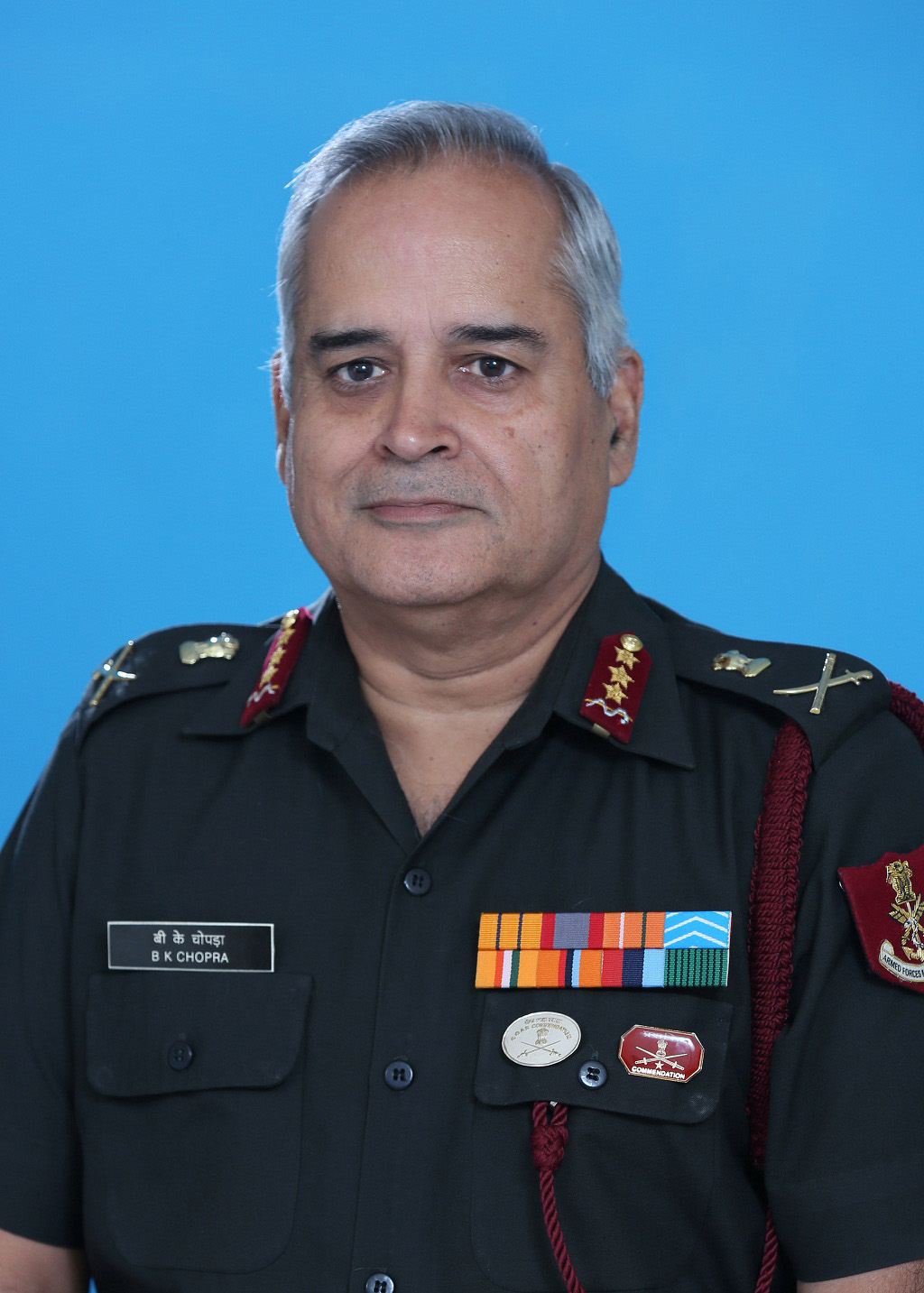
Lieutenant General BK Chopra, with the COAS and Army Commendation badges on the left breast pocket.

== Style of wearing ==
- The badge is worn immediately above and on either side of the button of the flap of the left breast pocket. If a person has been awarded both the COAS and Army Commendation badges, the former is to the right of the button and the latter to the left.
- If an individual has been awarded the Chief of the Naval Staff or Chief of the Air Staff Commendation cards, they can continue to wear it as long as they are posted to Navy, Air Force or tri-service organisations. Once they revert to an Army organisation, they will wear the COAS commendation badge.
- Individuals posted to Navy/Air Force/tri service organizations can wear the Commendation Badge of that service/establishment only for the duration of their tenure. On reversion to Army, they will wear the Army Commendation Badge.

== Design ==
- The COAS Commendation Badge medal is oval in shape and made of brass. It has the ensign of the Indian Army - the Lion Capital of Ashoka with two cross swords under it. It has the words COAS COMMENDATION and सेनाध्यक्ष प्रशंसा.

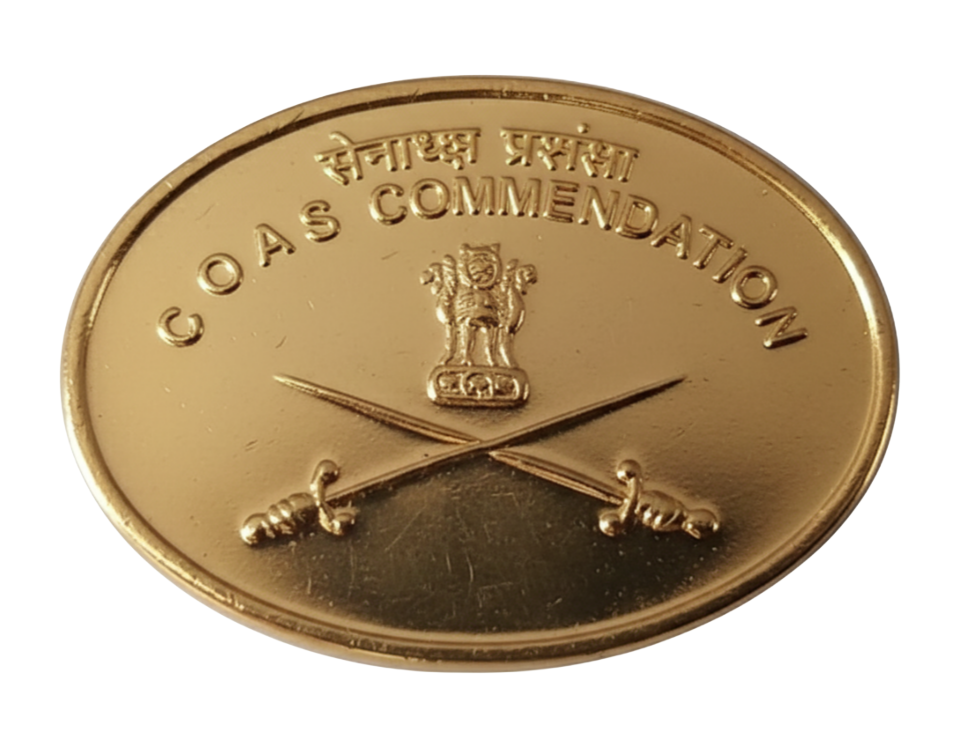

- The Army Commendation Badge is octagonal in shape with a red base and golden border. It has the ensign of the Indian Army with the words COMMENDATION and प्रशस्ति.

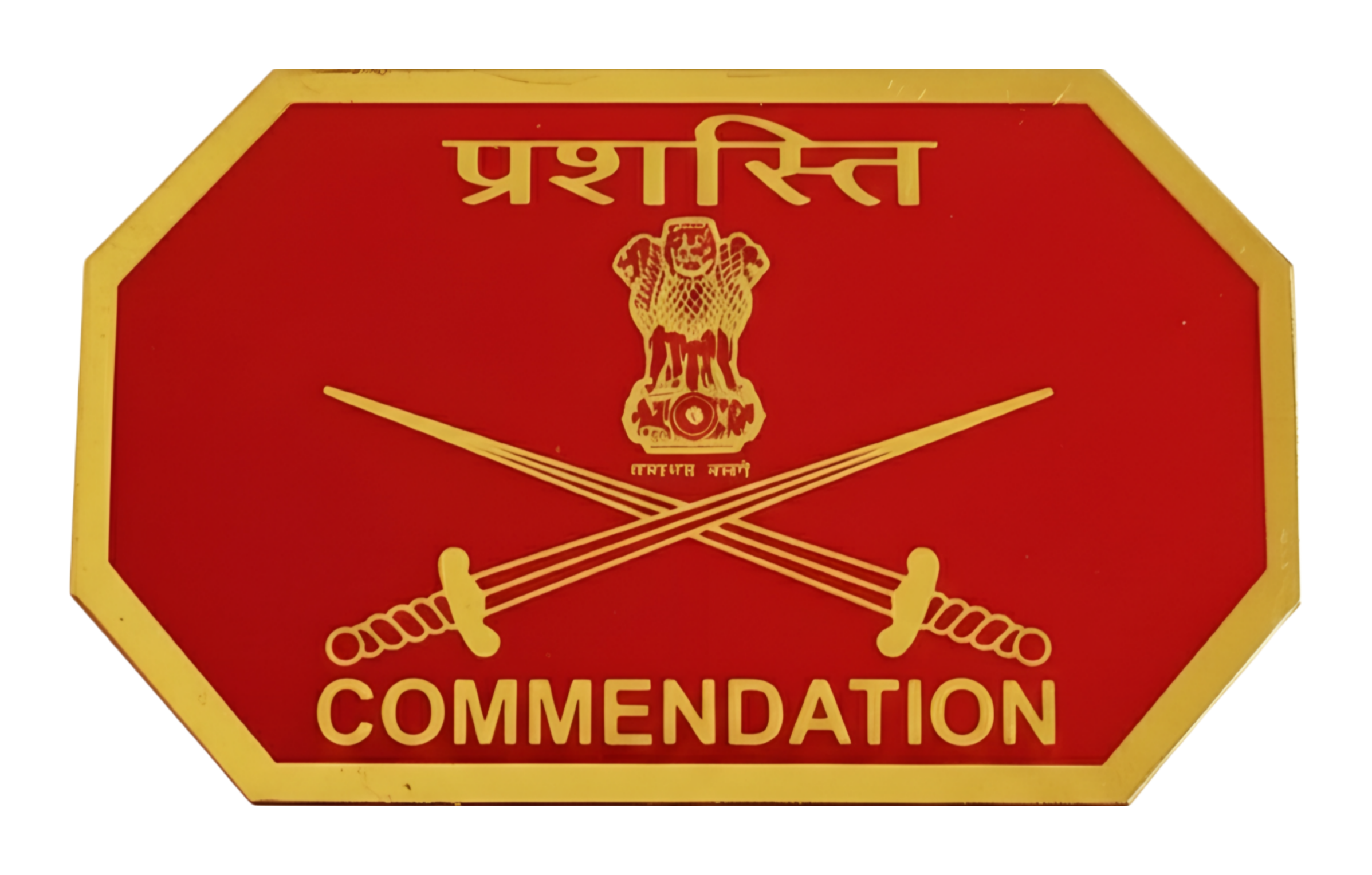

== Recipients ==
Most recipients are serving personnel of the Indian Army. The Commendation cards are occasionally awarded to non-Army personnel and civilians, who usually have worked under the supervision, direction and control of the army. They have also been awarded to dogs from the Army Dog Unit and mules from the Animal Transport Unit.
