= Burma Rifles =

British colonial regiment raised in Burma

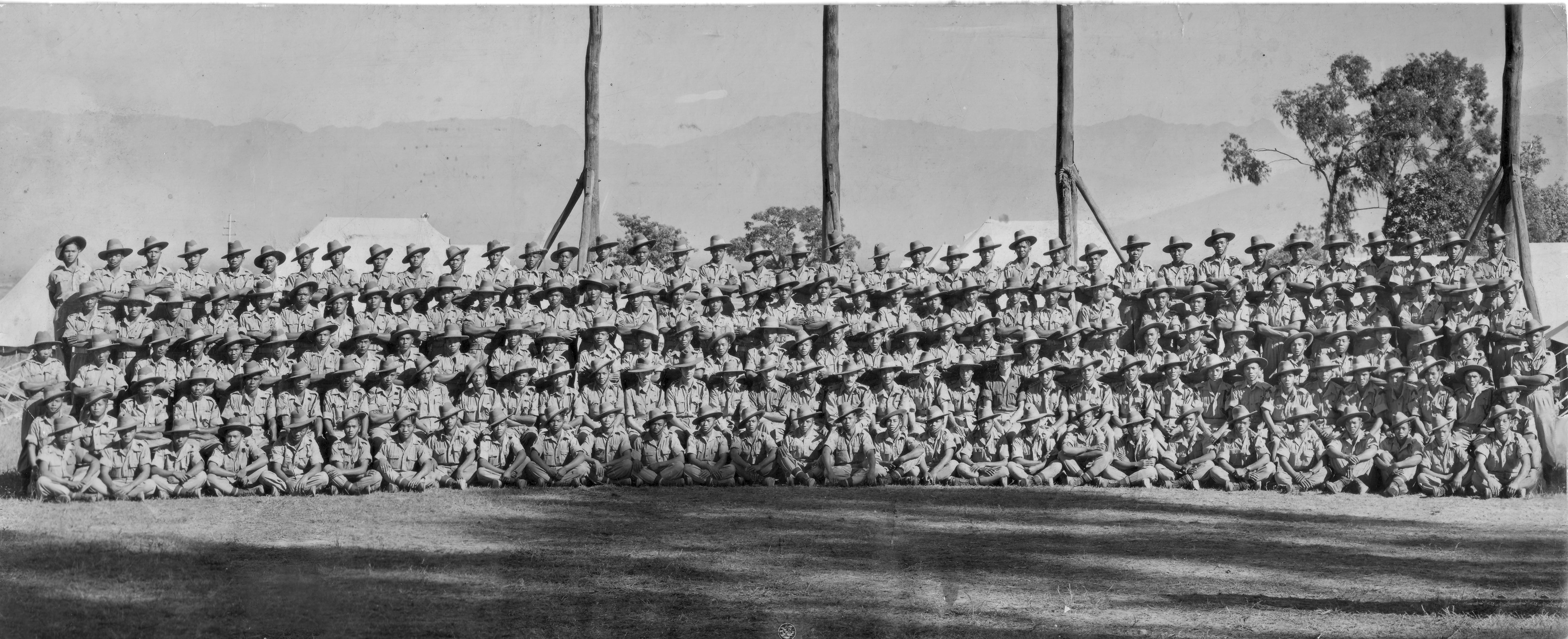
The Burma Rifles in 1944

The Burma Rifles were a British colonial regiment raised in Burma. Founded in 1917 as a regiment of the British Indian Army, the regiment re-used the name of an unrelated earlier unit, the 10th Regiment (1st Burma Rifles) Madras Infantry, which evolved into the 10th Princess Mary's Own Gurkha Rifles. After Burma was formally separated from India, the regiment was allocated to Burma. Following Burma's independence from Britain in 1948, the regiment was absorbed into the new Burmese army.

== Origins of the regiment ==
=== Early history ===
The expansion of the British Indian Army during World War I led to the raising of two companies of Burma Pioneers in Mandalay in November 1916. Burmese of all groups were recruited for these units. After expanding to four companies, the Pioneers became the 70th Burma Rifles in September 1917. The 85th Burman Rifles were raised from the Burma Military Police in July 1917. A second battalion of 70th Burma Rifles was raised in January 1918 and both battalions served in the Middle East in 1918–20. Two more battalions were raised during 1918. According to John Gaylor in his history: Sons of John Company – The Indian & Pakistan Armies 1903–1991, the 3/70th Burma Rifles, raised in April 1918, went to Southern India to suppress the Moplah Rising whilst the 4/70th, raised in May 1918, remained in Burma.

=== 1922 reorganisation of the British Indian Army ===
In the 1922 reorganisation of the British Indian Army the 70th Burma Rifles and the 85th Burma Rifles were merged to form the 20th Burma Rifles. The new regiment numbered four regular battalions. A new battalion, the 11th (Territorial) Battalion was also formed in 1922.

The Burman element in the regiment was mustered out after 1927, although Burmans continued to serve in the Burma Military Police. Personnel drawn from the hill-tribes of Burma and other groups (Karens, Kachins and Chin) continued to serve and in 1940 Burmans were again recruited, although the Anglo-Burmese tended to be overly represented in the Burma Rifles and the Burma Military Police.

=== Separation from India ===
After the British formally separated Burma from India in 1937 the 20th Burma Rifles was allocated to Burma and renamed the Burma Rifles. The intention was for officers to be drawn from the British Army. However the majority of the British officers already serving with the regiment chose to remain with their units on secondment from the British Indian Army.

== Second World War ==
The regiment was expanded during the Second World War to a total of 14 battalions and served through the Japanese invasion of Burma during the Burma campaign. Eight battalions of infantry were raised along with a holding battalion, a training battalion and four territorial battalions. The men of the territorial battalions were under no obligation to serve outside the borders of Burma.

After the British Burma Army's retreat from Burma, a reconstituted 2nd Battalion continued to take part in the Burma campaign. The remaining highly weakened battalions were disbanded although many of the non-Burmese nationals (Indians and Gurkhas) from them went to form battalions of the Burma Regiment created in September 1942.

The 2nd Battalion participated in the 1st and 2nd Chindit expeditions into Burma. In his official report following the first expedition Orde Wingate the Chindit commander wrote:

I would like to record here that I have never had under my command in the field as good a body of men as the 2nd Burma Rifles.

As a result, for the 1943 Chindit operation, the battalion was expanded and broken down into reconnaissance platoons for the Chindit columns. In 1944, the battalion was broken down into three detachments for attachment to Special Forces units among the Chindit force.

In 1945, the 2nd Burma Rifles was reconstituted as an infantry battalion. In July 1945, the 1st battalion was re-raised in Burma. Over the following three years leading up to Burmese independence, the 3rd through 6th battalions were re-raised.

=== Post-Second World War ===
Reorganised as a conventional infantry battalion of four companies, the 2nd Burma Rifles was based at Hshiarpur in India, where it remained until August 1945. It was listed in September 1945 as being as part of an internal security and administration static command in the South Burma District. In January 1946 the battalion was transferred to Syriam and in May 1947 formed part of a force involved in operations against dacoits. On 4 January 1948 Burma became independent and the Burma Rifles was absorbed into the new Myanmar Army, which unlike its Indian and Pakistani counterparts did not retain the regimental structure and most traditions of the former Indian Army.

== Uniform and insignia ==
The mess uniform of the Burma Rifles was rifle green with scarlet facings. In Volume 2 of his work "Indian Army Uniforms" W.Y. Carman describes a full dress uniform in the same colours, noting that it was worn by officers and other ranks forming part of the Coronation Contingent of 1937. It is not however known on what other occasions (if any) it was used.

The last surviving Burma Rifles Officer, Major Neville Hogan MBE noted the following further insignia distinctions from the Second World War period: Shoulder titles : rifle green with "BURMA RIFLES" in red. Collar dogs: a (male) Burmese peacock (displaying) over a title-scroll "BURMA RIFLES" in white metal (officers silver or silver gilt). Officers pips: silver for full dress, black for service dress. Black embroidered onto red worsted (after the traditions of the 60th Rifles/KRRC). Enlisted stripes & crowns: black embroidered onto rifle green worsted (after the traditions of the 95th Rifles/Rifle Brigade).

This unusual mix was noted and verified by photographs in Major Hogan's collection.

== Titles of the regiment ==
- 70th Burma Rifles / 85th Burman Rifles
- 20th Burma Rifles
- Burma Rifles
