= Battle of Bilin River =

Coordinates: 17.182429°N 97.246706°E

- Part of the Burma campaign of World War II
Date	14 February 1942 – 19 February 1942
Location	Burma
Result	Japanese victory

Belligerents
(United Kingdom) British Empire (British Raj) British India	Japan

Commanders and leaders
(United Kingdom) Sir John Smyth	(Empire of Japan) Shōjirō Iida

Strength
1 division	2 divisions

The Battle of Bilin River was among the early major battles of the Burma Campaign in World War II. Fought between 14 and 19 February 1942, the battle was a tactical victory for Japan over the British Indian Army, and it led to a decisive victory for Japan immediately afterwards at the Battle of Sittang Bridge.

Brigadier Sir John George Smyth, V.C.—who commanded 17th Infantry Division of the British Indian Army at Bilin River—said the Bilin River "at that time of year was only a ditch, but a good co-ordinating line". 17th Division was, at that time, a new formation that had yet to see its first battle.

The Japanese 112th Battalion of the Southern Army entered Burma (now Myanmar) on 15 January. They took Tavoy (now Dawei) on 19 January, cutting off the garrison at Mergui (which escaped by sea). In the process, they captured three small airfields, giving them close air support. They then advanced towards Kawkareik.

Smyth wanted to withdraw immediately to better defensive terrain, but he was ordered to "stay put".

== Prelude ==
The 17th Division gave everything it had at Bilin and surrendered no ground to the Japanese; but, as the pressure increased, every single reserve had to be thrown into the battle—and even then we could not prevent strong parties of the enemy turning our flanks.

— Brigadier Sir John George Smyth, V.C.

On 26 January, the Japanese 55th Division advanced on Moulmein. Taking the town would give them another airfield, but it was hard for the Indians to defend. It was also a difficult place from which to retreat, because there was no bridge over the Gulf of Martaban; any retreat would need to be by ferry.

The British Indian Army held out for two days of fierce fighting, and then got away on a river steamer. In the process, they lost about 600 soldiers and a significant amount of materiel.

Smyth sent Brigadier "Punch" Cowan to Rangoon to speak with the Army Commander, General Hutton, and ask for permission to move to behind the Sittang River (now Sittaung). In what Smyth called a "disastrous decision", and perhaps influenced by his own orders from higher up, Hutton refused.

Under the cover of night of 11–12 February, the Japanese Army crossed the Salween River from Pa-an, and attacked British forces at Kuzeik, on the opposite bank. After a few hours of fierce fighting, the Japanese overran the British defences. The town of Bilin lay along the bank of the Bilin River to the north-west of Kuzeik, with no major water-bodies in between.

== The battle ==
17th Division held at the Bilin River for two days of close-quarters jungle fighting. The Japanese tactics were to outflank, and eventually with encirclement imminent, Hutton came up from Rangoon and gave Smyth permission to fall back. 17th Division disengaged under cover of darkness and began a 30-mile (48 km) retreat along the dusty track to the Sittang Bridge.

== Aftermath ==
17th Division slowly withdrew towards the bridge over the Sittang River. But it was outflanked by the Japanese who reached the area of the bridge and forced its demolition. The bulk of 17th Division was caught on the wrong side of the Sittang. While most of the men were able to eventually cross the river, almost all of their equipment had been lost.

== Sources ==
- Liddell Hart, B.H., History of the Second World War. New York: G.P. Putnam, 1970. ISBN 0-306-80912-5.
- Slim, William (1956), Defeat Into Victory. Citations from the Four Square Books 1958 edition which lacks an ISBN, but also available from NY: Buccaneer Books ISBN 1-56849-077-1, Cooper Square Press ISBN 0-8154-1022-0; London: Cassell ISBN 0-304-29114-5, Pan ISBN 0-330-39066-X.
