= 2nd Cinque Ports Artillery Volunteers =

2nd Cinque Ports Artillery Volunteers 2nd Home Counties Brigade, RFA 58th (Sussex) Field Regiment, RA 114th (Sussex) Field Regiment, RA 84th (Sussex) Medium Regiment, RA 258 (Sussex) Heavy AA Regiment, RA
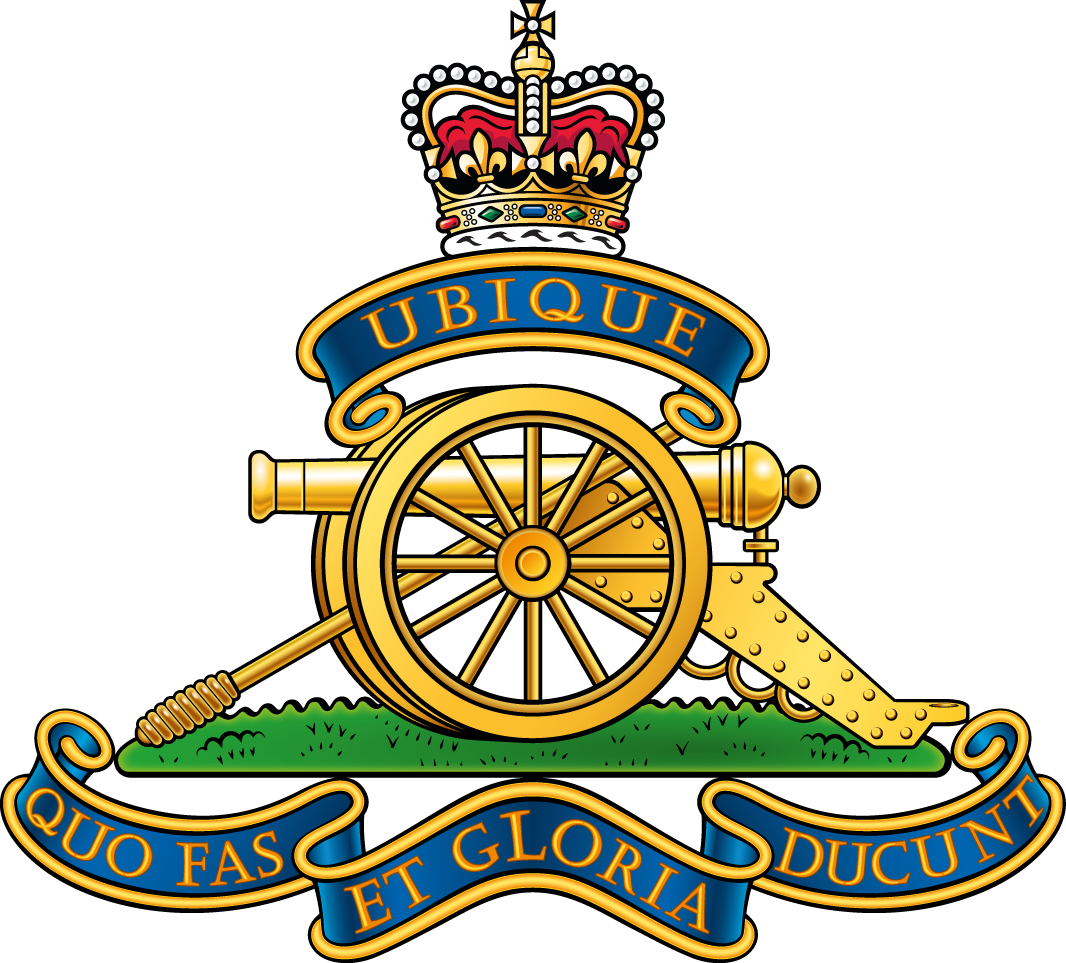
- Cap badge of the Royal Artillery
- Active: 1 April 1890–10 March 1955
- Country: United Kingdom
- Branch: Territorial Army
- Type: Artillery Regiment
- Role: Garrison Artillery; Field Artillery; Medium Artillery; Anti-Aircraft Artillery
- Garrison/HQ: St Leonards-on-Sea; Eastbourne
- Engagements: WWI: Mesopotamia; WWII: Battle of France; Dunkirk Evacuation; Alamein; Operation Husky; Operation Baytown; Normandy; Arnhem; Reichswald; Rhine Crossing; Burma; Mandalay

The 2nd Cinque Ports Artillery Volunteers was a part-time unit of the British Army's Royal Artillery from 1890 to 1955. Raised as coastal defence artillery, it later served as field artillery in Mesopotamia during the First World War and in the Battle of France and Second Battle of El Alamein during the Second World War. Its successor units later operated as medium artillery in North West Europe, and as jungle artillery in Burma. Postwar, it became an anti-aircraft unit.

== Volunteer Force ==
The enthusiasm for the Volunteer Movement following an invasion scare in 1859 saw the creation of many units composed of part-time soldiers eager to supplement the Regular British Army in time of need. A large number of coastal artillery units were formed in the seaports along the Kent and Sussex coast (the ancient Cinque Ports), and in September 1862 these artillery volunteer corps (AVCs) were brought together to form the 1st Cinque Ports Artillery Volunteers at Dover:

On 1 April 1890, the Sussex batteries were separated from the 1st Cinque Ports Artillery to form the 2nd Cinque Ports Artillery Volunteers in the Eastern Division of the Royal Artillery (RA). As well as manning fixed coast defence artillery, some of the Volunteer companies were now being reorganised with semi-mobile field guns as 'position batteries' to work alongside the Volunteer infantry brigades. On 14 July 1892 the 2nd Cinque Ports AV were reorganised with one position battery and by 30 September 1894 had two, together with three companies:

- HQ at St Leonards-on-Sea
- No 1 Battery at St Leonards – originally 7th Cinque Ports AVC, raised on 23 November 1867
- No 2 Battery at Hastings – originally 6th Cinque Ports AVC, raised on 20 February 1860
- No 3 Company at Ninfield – originally 2nd Bty, 9th Cinque Ports AVC, raised in 1874
- No 4 Company at Pevensey – originally 1st Bty 9th Cinque Ports AVC, raised on 9 April 1866
- No 5 Company at Bexhill-on-Sea

In 1899, all artillery volunteers became part of the Royal Garrison Artillery (RGA). In 1901, the whole unit was converted to position artillery, later 'heavy artillery', with No 4 and 5 Companies amalgamating as 3rd Heavy Battery at Bexhill. When the divisional structure was abolished on 1 January 1902, the unit was designated the 2nd Cinque Ports RGA (Volunteers).

== Territorial Force ==
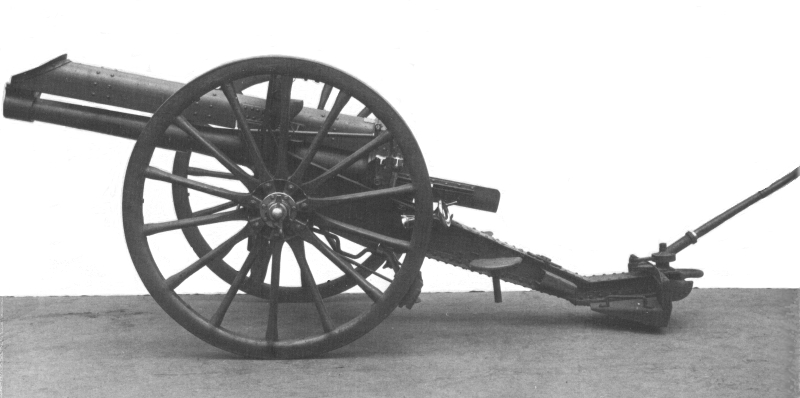
15-pounder gun.

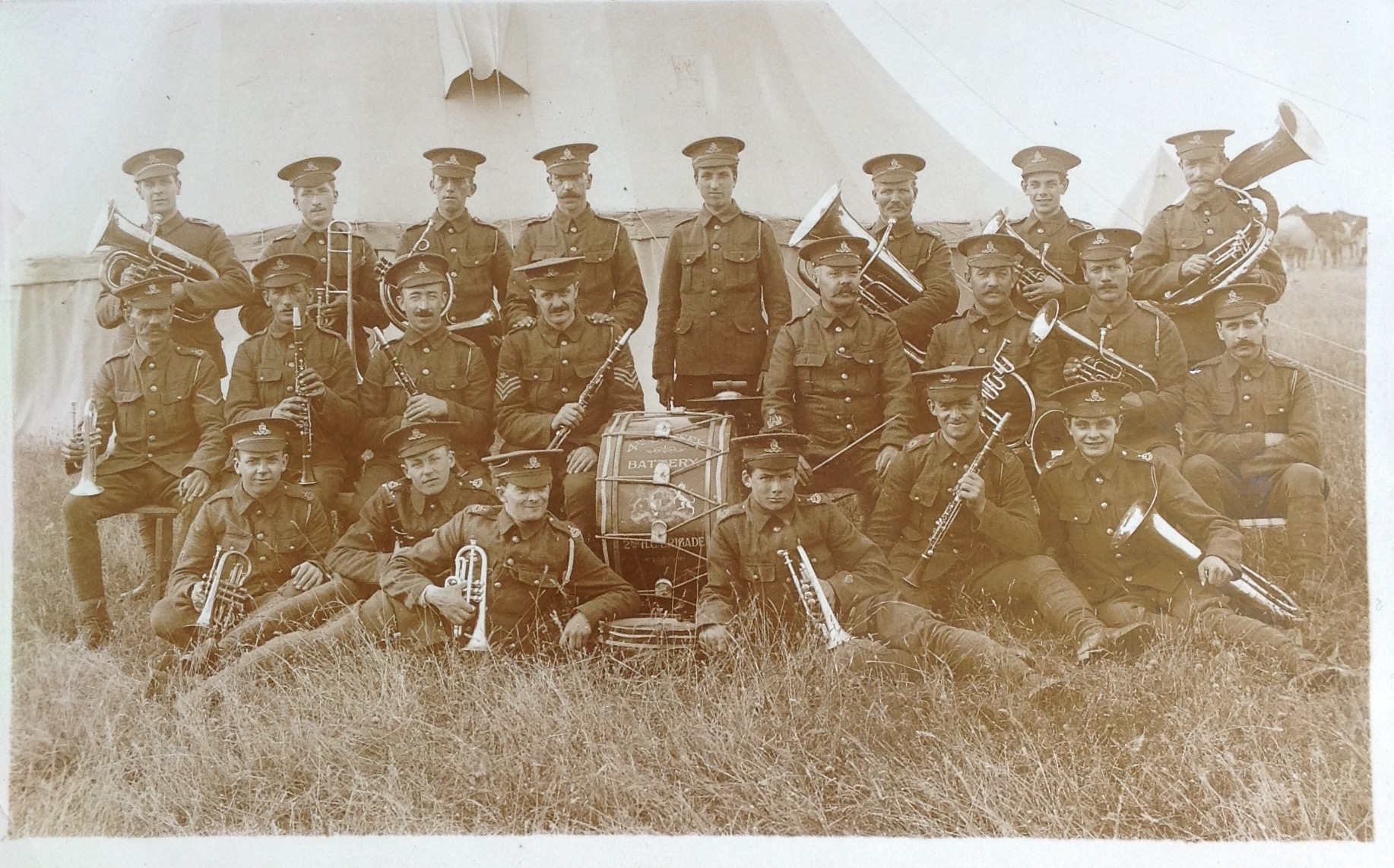
Band of the 4th Sussex Battery, 2nd (Home Counties) Brigade, RFA (TF), c1910

When the Volunteers were subsumed into the new Territorial Force (TF) under the Haldane Reforms of 1908, the 2nd Cinque Ports RGA merged with the 2nd Sussex RGA and transferred to the Royal Field Artillery (RFA) to form the II (or 2nd) Home Counties Brigade in October 1908 with the following organisation: (Note: In the original proposals the unit would have been numbered III (or 3rd) Home Counties Brigade, but the officers of the 1st Volunteer Battalion, Royal Sussex Regiment rejected their conversion to artillery to form the 2nd Brigade, and the numbering was revised.)

II Home Counties Brigade, RFA

- HQ at The Goffs, Eastbourne, – from 2nd Cinque Ports
- 4th Sussex Battery at Eastbourne – from 2nd Sussex
- 5th Sussex Battery at Hatherley Road, St Leonards – from 2nd Cinque Ports
- 6th Sussex Battery at The Downs, Bexhill – from 2nd Sussex
- 2nd Home Counties Ammunition Column at Hailsham – from 2nd Cinque Ports

The three batteries were each equipped with four 15-pounder guns. The unit was assigned to the Home Counties Division of the TF.

Affiliated with the unit were the Imperial Service Cadet Corps, Eastbourne, and St Leonards Collegiate School Cadet Corps.

== World War I ==
=== Mobilisation ===
On the outbreak of war, the Territorial Force was mobilised for home defence and units were then invited to volunteer for overseas service. On 15 August 1914 the War Office issued instructions to separate those men who had signed up for Home Service only, and form these into reserve units. On 31 August, the formation of a reserve or 2nd Line unit was authorised for each 1st Line unit where 60 per cent or more of the men had volunteered for Overseas Service. Duplicate battalions, brigades and divisions were thereby created, mirroring those TF formations being sent overseas. The titles of these 2nd Line units would be the same as the original, but distinguished by a '2/' prefix. In this way the 1/II and 2/II Home Counties (Cinque Ports) Brigades were formed.

=== 1/II Home Counties Brigade ===
The bulk of the Home Counties Division, including the 1/II Home Counties Brigade without its Brigade Ammunition Column, embarked at Southampton and sailed on 30 October 1914 for India to relieve Regular Army units to fight on the Western Front. The Territorials disembarked at Bombay 1–3 December, and were allotted to various peacetime stations across India. Although the Home Counties Division remained in the order of battle and received a number (as the 44th (Home Counties) Division) in May 1915, it never served as a complete formation during the First World War. The 1/II Home Counties Bde was assigned to the 3rd Lahore Divisional Area in the Punjab (the fighting units of the 3rd (Lahore) Division having gone to the Western Front in September). 1/4th Sussex Bty went to Ambala, then to Rawalpindi in June 1915, the 1/5th Sussex went to Multan and 1/6th Sussex to Ferozepore.

The Territorials completed their training in India to prepare them for possible active service, and supplied drafts to units serving in the Mesopotamian campaign. In 1916 the brigade was formally renumbered as CCXXI Brigade (221st Bde). In December 1916, the 1/4th Sussex Bty (now at Ferozepore) and the 1/5th Sussex Bty (now at Ambala) joined with the 1/1st and 1/3rd Sussex Btys (from 1/I Home Counties Brigade) to form the I Combined Home Counties Brigade.

In May 1917, the 3rd (Lahore) Divisional Area was dissolved and its responsibilities passed to 16th Indian Division. CCXXI Bde was under the command of this division from April to September 1917. The brigade was finally re-equipped with the modern 18-pounder gun during 1917 and the batteries redesignated 1067, 1068 and 1069; 1069 Bty was then broken up between 1067 and 1068 to bring them up to a six-gun establishment. It also reformed a Brigade Ammunition Column ready for active service. It sailed to Basra, where it landed between 18 and 25 October 1917, to reinforce the forces fighting in Mesopotamia.

=== 2/II Home Counties Brigade ===
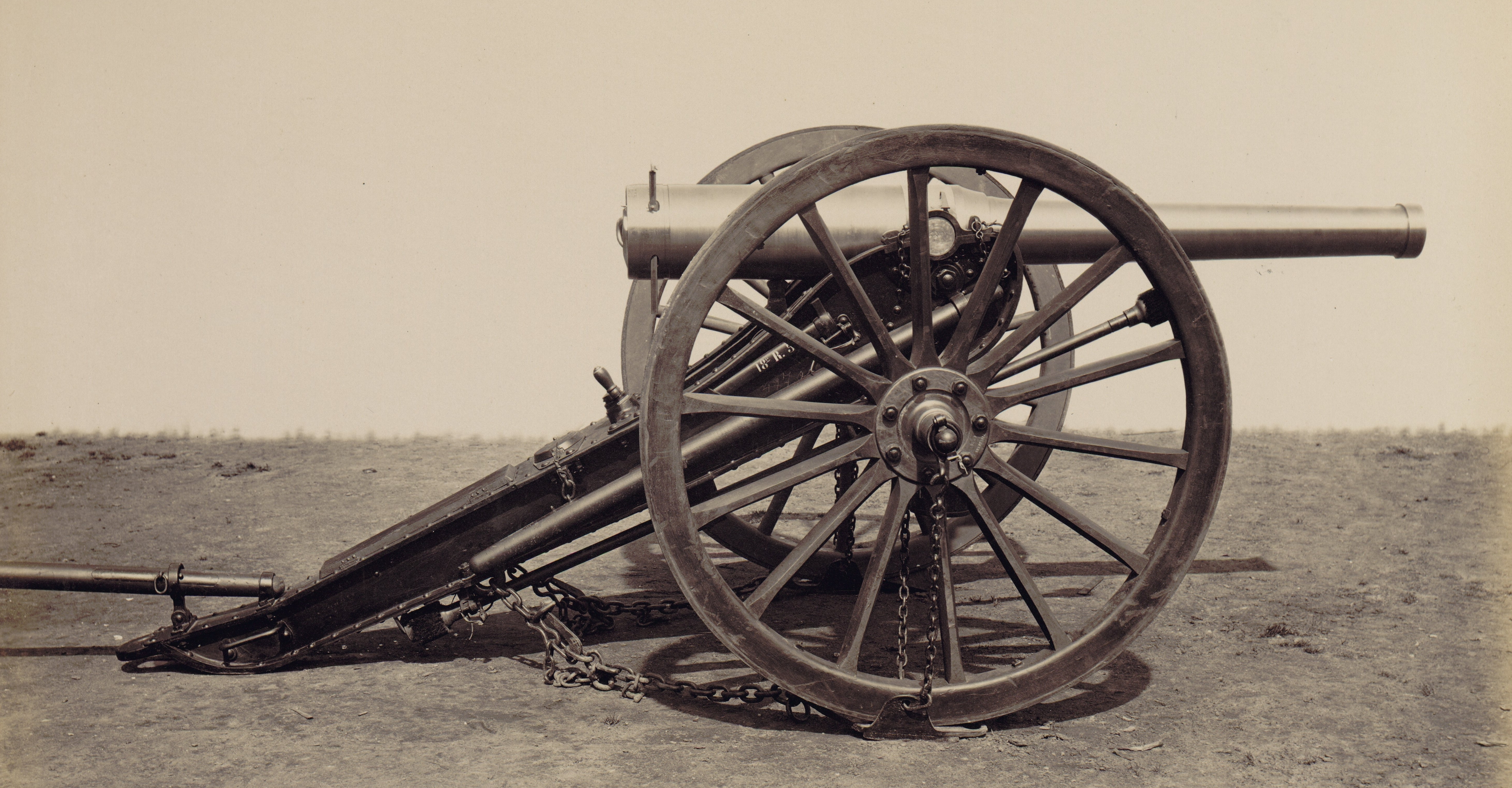
De Bange 90 mm French field gun issued to 2nd Line batteries.

Because the 1st Home Counties Division had gone to India, the 2nd Home Counties Division was among the earliest 2nd Line formations to be formed. By 27 November 1914 the division was settled in billets round Windsor, Berkshire and was reported ready to receive its weapons. However, the only guns available for the RFA brigades were obsolete French 90 mm guns, and even then there were only 4 guns per brigade. It was not until January 1916 that the division's gunners received their modern 18-pounders, and even then some time elapsed before sights were received.

Meanwhile, the division had been numbered as 67th (2nd Home Counties) Division and given a dual role of training drafts for units serving overseas and at the same time being part of the mobile force responsible for home defence. From November 1915 it formed part of Second Army, Central Force, quartered in Kent. Twice the division was warned to prepare for moves to Ireland, and in April 1917 to deploy to France, but these moves never happened and the division remained in England for the whole war.

In May 1916, the field brigades were numbered, with 2/II Home Counties becoming CCCXXXVI Brigade (336 Bde) and the batteries were designated A, B and C. A howitzer battery (D (H)) equipped with 4.5-inch howitzers was added later in the year when CCCXXXVIII (2/IV Home Counties) Howitzer Bde was broken up. In 1917, the 18-pounder batteries were brought up to a strength of six guns when CCCXXXV (formerly 2/I Home Counties) Bde was broken up. The brigade left 67th Division on 9 November 1917 and sailed to Mesopotamia where it fought alongside its 1st Line Brigade.

=== Mesopotamia ===
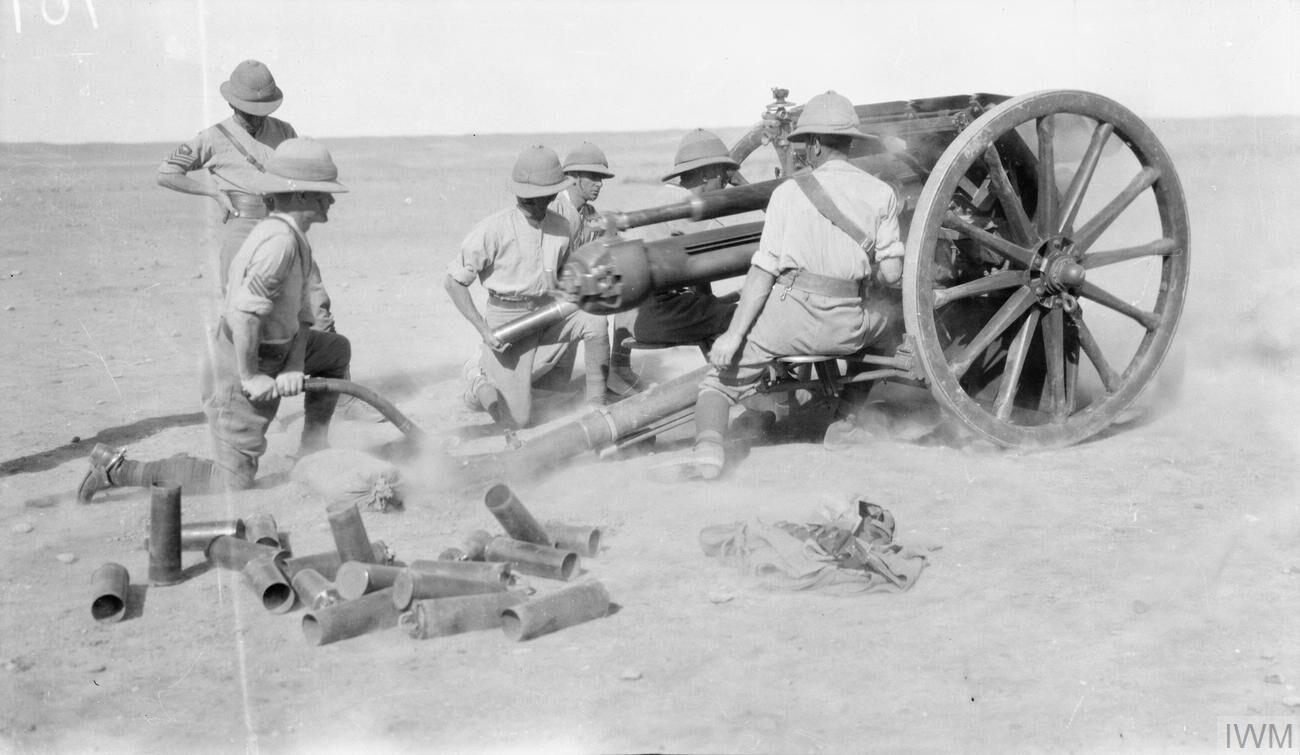
18-pounder in action in Mesopotamia.

CCXXI Brigade made its way from Basra to Baghdad where it joined the newly formed 17th Indian Division. In April 1918, it was joined by 404th (Howitzer) Bty from England equipped with six 4.5-inch howitzers and a Volunteer Battery with four 18-pounders from 15th Indian Division. Meanwhile, CCCXXXVI Bde under the command of Lt-Col F.A. Buzzard moved up from Basra to join the newly formed 18th Indian Division. The two new divisions constituted the bulk of I Indian Corps Lt-Gen Sir Alexander Cobbe, VC, which concentrated at Tikrit on the Tigris Front in October 1918.

By now, the Turks were in retreat in Palestine and on the Euphrates Front in Mesopotamia, and it was time for the forces on the Tigris Front to exert pressure by advancing on Mosul. 17th Indian Division moved up the west bank and 18th Division up the east bank. The problem was the strong Turkish position on the Little Zab river and the Fat-Ha gorge, 35 miles further on. Rather than make a direct assault with the untried 17th and 18th Indian Divisions, Cobbe chose to outflank the gorge with a mobile column.

On 23 October, the 17th and 18th Divisions were within a mile of the Fat-Ha trenches. Both 221st and 336th Bdes (less D/336) were on the west bank with 17th Division. A section of D/336 Bty was with 7th Indian Cavalry Brigade on the right flank. 18th Division advanced as the moon rose at 21.30, with D/336 in the plain north of the pass and all the guns with 17th Division ready to give support from across the river. However, the leading waves found the Turkish trenches empty. When 17th Division advanced, covered by its reinforced artillery, it also found the Turkish positions empty; the flanking column had done its job.

Having passed through the Fat-Ha gorge, 18th Division moved its artillery (including D/336) across appalling going and successfully attacked the Little Zab on 25 October. The following day, 336th Bde crossed back to 18th Division's command and B/336 moved up-river while A/336 was at the Little Zab bridgehead. On 27 October, the 17th Division advanced with support from 18th Division's artillery from across the river and once again found the enemy trenches empty. It set off in pursuit to the main Turkish position at Sharqat. At dawn, on 28 October, the Turks counter-attacked from Sharqat and were engaged by D/336, which had been pushed ahead of 18th Division along the other bank of the river. Having stopped this attack, the 17th Division then drove the Turks out of their position and continued the pursuit.

With the cavalry blocking their retreat to Mosul, the Turks at Sharqat were now cut off, and 17th and 18th Divisions turned all their guns on them. 17th Division attacked at 16.00 on 29 October, supported by the guns of 18th Division, then at 19.00 the 18th advanced with 54th Indian Brigade and two batteries of 336th Bde. On the morning of 30 October, the cavalry were deployed to attack Sharqat with the leading elements of 18th Division, including B/336, C/336 and D/336 Btys, when the Turks in the town surrendered.

The commander of 18th Indian Division, Maj-Gen Hew Fanshawe, was immediately sent on with a mobile column including C/336 Bty to destroy the remaining Turkish forces and capture Mosul. The column forded the Tigris, with artillery horses assisting the mule carts, and pushed on to the city which fell without a fight after news arrived of the signing of the Armistice of Mudros and the end of hostilities on 31 October.

At the end of the war, 17th and 18th Indian Divisions were selected to form part of the occupation force in Iraq and served during the Iraq Rebellion of 1920. It is not clear when the TF units were demobilised and sent home; the 44th (Home Counties) Division began to reform in 1920.

== Interwar ==
When the TF was reconstituted on 7 February 1920 the 2nd Home Counties brigade was reformed with 5–8th (Sussex) Batteries, still the in reconstituted 44th (Home Counties) Division was reconstituted. The TF was reorganised as the Territorial Army (TA) in 1920, and the brigade was redesignated 58th (Home Counties) Brigade, RFA, with the following organisation:

- HQ at Drill Hall, The Goffs, Eastbourne
- 229th (Sussex) Bty at Eastbourne
- 230th (Sussex) Bty at Hatherley Road, St Leonards
- 231st (Sussex) Bty at The Downs, Bexhill
- 232nd (Sussex) Bty (Howitzers) at Drill Hall, Hailsham

As well as the Imperial Service and St Leonards Collegiate cadet corps, the unit also had the Roborough School (Eastbourne) and Christ Church cadet corps affiliated to it.

The unit was redesignated a 'Field Brigade' in 1923 when the RFA was merged into the Royal Artillery (RA). In August 1938, the batteries adopted town titles in place of 'Sussex', and when the RA adopted the designation 'regiment' in place of 'brigade' in November that year it had the following organisation:

58th (Sussex) Field Regiment, RA

- 229 (Eastbourne) Bty
- 230 (Hastings) Bty
- 231 (Bexhill) Bty
- 232 (Hailsham) Bty (Howitzer)

With the expansion of the TA after the Munich Crisis, most units split to form duplicates. In the case of the 58th, 231 and 232 Batteries left on 24 May 1939 to form a new 114th Field Regiment, RA, at Bexhill. At this time batteries consisted of 12 guns each, which in TA regiments were still 18-pounders.

== World War II ==
=== 58th (Sussex) Field Regiment ===
==== Battle of France ====
On the outbreak of war on 3 September 1939, 58th (Sussex) Fd Rgt mobilised at Eastbourne and on 24 October it moved to Bridport for intensive training. 44th (HC) Division began moving to France to join the British Expeditionary Force (BEF) on 1 April 1940, and 58th Fd Rgt landed at Cherbourg – Maupertus Airport on 5 April. Under the command of Lt-Col G.W.E Heath it moved up to the Belgian Border.

When the German offensive in the west opened on 10 May, the BEF advanced into Belgium in accordance with 'Plan D', with 44th (HC) Division moving up to the Escaut, where it was in reserve. However, the German Army broke through the Ardennes to the east, forcing the BEF to withdraw again, and by 19 February the whole force was back across the Escaut and 58th Fd Egt was in action at Ooike near Courtrai, with 229 and 230 Btys respectively south and north of the village, covering the canal. The regiment sent roving troops forward from each battery and sent a Forward Observation Officer (FOO) over the canal to Oudenaarde to obtain information and direct harassing fire onto the enemy.

This was the most threatened part of the British line, and there was severe fighting after the enemy established bridgeheads across the Escaut by dawn on 20 May. However, it was the deep German penetration further east that forced the BEF to withdraw to the next canal line on the Belgian frontier by 23 May. 44th (HC) Division withdrew into GHQ Reserve, and then took up positions immediately south of Hazebrouck. On the morning of 27 May this line came under attack. 58th Field Rgt had an Observation Post (OP) in Morbecque Church and 'the batteries had great shooting'. Later in the day 229 Bty engaged tanks over open sights and destroyed two of them. 'One gun under Sergeant Baker, got the better of four more tanks, but in the end he and all his detachment lay wounded. The guns of the Battery remained in action as British infantry passed through them and were only withdrawn when they came under machine gun fire'.

By now, the decision had been made to withdraw the BEF to Dunkirk for evacuation (Operation Dynamo). 58th Field Rgt withdrew north-eastwards to Grand Sec Bois and later to Merris, where on 28 May it received orders to cover the withdrawal of 132nd Brigade. There was much shooting as the enemy tried to close, then at 21.00 the regiment was ordered to withdraw to Flêtre. On 29 May the regiment covered 132nd Bde to Mont des Cats and on to Dunkirk that night. All routes by now were completely blocked by abandoned French vehicles and the regiment destroyed its guns and vehicles before marching to the evacuation beaches on foot. 44th (HC) Division got away in pretty good order aboard boats on 30–31 May, but 58th Fd Rgt lost a number of officers and men in the process.

==== Home Defence ====
After evacuation, the artillery of 44th (HC) Division reformed in the Oxford area before moving to Northern England to be re-equipped. 58th Field Rgt assembled at Doncaster and carried out infantry training until some 25-pounder guns began to arrive in late July. It then moved to Brenzett in Sussex, where Lt-Col Heath handed over to Lt-Col R.P. Baxter. (Lieutenant-Col Heath later became Commander, RA, for 43rd (Wessex) Division, XII Corps and I Airborne Corps.)

In Sussex, 44th (HC) Division manned a key part of the anti-invasion defences in South East England under XII Corps. Field regiments were now changing to an organisation of three 8-gun batteries rather than two 12-gun batteries, so while the regiment was stationed at Brenzett in Kent it formed a new battery on 15 January 1941, initially designated 'Y' Bty, numbered as 441 Fd Bty on 11 March. The division remained in Sussex and Kent until the end of May 1942, when it embarked for the Middle East. 58th (Sussex) Field Rgt sailed from Liverpool on 31 May aboard the Laconia, landing at Port Tewfik in Egypt on 26 July, where it was equipped with 24 x 25-pounder guns.

==== North Africa ====
At the time of its arrival, the British forces in Egypt were facing a crisis against Rommel's Panzerarmee Afrika, and the division was lucky not to be thrown straight into action without any desert experience. Instead it got a bare month to train and was positioned on the key south-facing Alam el Halfa ridge when Rommel resumed his offensive with a right hook round the British Eighth Army's defences at El Alamein. During the resulting Battle of Alam el Halfa on 31 August the German Afrika Korps was drawn into attacking dug-in British tanks, supported by 44th Divisional artillery.

During the Second Battle of El Alamein, 44th (HC) Division supported 7th Armoured Division, which itself was tasked with carrying out a subsidiary attack on the first day (23 October). Much of this support was with artillery fire. 58th Field Rgt contributed to the famous '1000 gun' barrage that opened the battle. In the later stages of the battle elements of the division were switched north to assist the main breakthrough.

44th (HC) Division was broken up after Alamein and 58th Fd Rgt became an Army Field Regiment under Eighth Army. In January 1943 it joined 5th Army Group Royal Artillery (5 AGRA) forming at Medenine in Tunisia. 5 AGRA usually supported XXX Corps. The regiment participated in the battles of Medenine, Mareth, Wadi Akarit, and the capture of Tunis. After the campaign ended, 441 Fd Bty was transferred to 124th (Northumbrian) Field Rgt on 22 May and was replaced by 186 (Independent) Fd Bty.

==== Italy ====
58th Field Rgt took part in the Allied invasion of Sicily (Operation Husky) as part of 5 AGRA supporting XXX Corps' campaign in the east of the island. 5 AGRA and the rest of XXX Corps artillery then provided crushing support for XIII Corps in its assault crossing of the Straits of Messina (Operation Baytown) on 3 September 1943. Against this force, the landings were not seriously disputed, and Eighth Army began advancing up the Calabria coast.

The regiment served briefly in the campaign on the Italian mainland but in November was withdrawn to the UK with 5 AGRA and other XXX Corps units to prepare for the Allied invasion of Europe (Operation Overlord).

=== 84th (Sussex) Medium Regiment ===
Once back in the UK, stationed at Felixstowe, the regiment was converted into a medium artillery regiment between 7 December 1943 and 6 January 1944. 186 Field Bty became independent once more, leaving the following organisation:

84th (Sussex) Medium Regiment, RA

- 250 (Eastbourne) Med Bty
- 251 (Hastings) Med Bty

During January 1944 it received its equipment of 16 x 5.5-inch guns (Note: Sources suggest that one battery of 84th Medium Rgt was equipped with 4.5-inch guns, (as was the case in 64th (London) Medium Rgt in 5 AGRA) but this is contradicted by the regimental War Diary.) and was officially mobilised on 1 February although AEC Matador gun tractors did not begin to arrive until the end of March. Firing training was held at the Sanctuary Ranges at Burnham Norton, Norfolk, in March and at Redesdale in Northumberland in April. The regiment also practised anti-tank shooting. In May it moved to Clacton-on-Sea for a XXX Corps training exercise and then in the first days of June it boarded transport ships bound for Normandy.

==== Normandy ====
The survey party of 84th (Sussex) Medium Regiment landed in the Normandy beachhead on D + 1 (7 June), having sailed from Tilbury Docks on D-Day, the guns arriving on Gold Beach 9 June. The regiment again formed part of 5 AGRA, in 21st Army Group.

Regimental HQ (RHQ) was established at St Martin les Entrees east of Bayeux, where the regiment's gun positions were protected by 113 Bty of 27th Light Anti-Aircraft Rgt of XXX Corps. The regiment carried out its first fire missions on 11 June. That night, while supporting 69th Brigade of 50th (Northumbrian) Division the FOO (Major Groom) called down fire on a group of Tiger tanks trying to penetrate the position, although he had already been wounded by them. 69th Brigade held their position, which became known as 'Tiger Hill'.

On 27 June, RHQ moved to Loucelles, where I Trp of 399 LAA Bty took over AA defence, and the regiment was assigned to support 15th (Scottish) Division during Operation Epsom. It then moved to Sainte-Honorine-de-Ducy to support 43rd (Wessex) Division on 1 July.

84th Medium Rgt carried out numerous fire missions over the coming weeks, RHQ moving frequently as 5 AGRA supported different formations during the campaign. During July and August the regiment had 284 Bty of 90th Heavy AA Rgt under its command. With the Luftwaffe making few appearances, the 3.7-inch guns of 90th HAA Rgt frequently took part in medium artillery fire programmes. At the end of August the regiment was involved in the Battle of Falaise.

==== Belgium ====
Once the breakout from the Normandy beachhead was accomplished 84th Med Rgt moved to the area of Vernon and then while the rest of 5 AGRA remained behind the regiment was attached to Guards Armoured Division during the rapid advance that culminated in the liberation of Brussels. During an attack on Brussels Airport, the division's field artillery (153rd (Leicestershire Yeomanry) Field Rgt) were unable to knock out a dangerous battery of 88 mm dual-purpose guns. "It was obvious that something more forceful would be needed and 84th Medium Regiment was asked to provide a regimental shoot, pending which the tanks would keep the heads of the enemy down. The regiment kindly obliged with unerring aim', after which the infantry and tanks went into the assault. While with Guards Armoured the regiment received AA protection from the Bofors guns of E Trp, 326 Bty of 94th LAA Rgt. It also had two Sherman OP tanks, and the lorries of a Royal Army Service Corps (RASC) platoon to help it move. Once the Irish Guards had established a bridgehead over the Bocholt–Herentals Canal (Joe's Bridge) on 10 September, 84th Med Rgt, with 275 Bty, 165th Heavy AA Rgt, under command, took up positions near Hechtel and provided fire support for the bridgehead.

==== Arnhem ====
On 16 September, the regiment received its orders for Operation Market Garden, which began the following day. 84th Medium Rgt was assigned to support Guards Armoured which was spearheading the advance. The regiment spent the next three days attempting to advance behind the Guards up the road to Valkenswaard, suffering a number of casualties under shellfire and bombing. All the troops were crammed in a narrow corridor and in danger of being cut off: Guards Armoured's Commander, Royal Artillery, ordered 84th Medium Rgt into action immediately on arrival, with one battery facing east and one west. The commanding officer pointed out that the field regiments were already deployed facing north and south.

At 01.00 on 20 September, 250 Bty deployed near Malden, and in the morning began shelling enemy gun positions. 251 Battery joined in that afternoon, and the regiment was given a fire plan to support the assault crossing of the Waal at Nijmegen. In the evening a section was ordered over the river to try to give long-range fire support to 1st Airborne Division at Arnhem, while the remainder of the regiment deploying at Nijmegen sports park, with a Troop of 275 HAA Bty under command with its 3.7-inch guns in a ground role. Target information was being supplied by telephone by members of the Dutch resistance. Lieutenant B.R. Leach of 84th Med Rgt, having previously trained as a parachute FOO, had flown back to England on 15 September and dropped with US 82nd Airborne Division on 17 September. He returned to the regiment on 21 September.

At 00.15 on 21 September, the regiment's advanced section opened fire – the first such support the beleaguered paratroops at Arnhem had received; only the radios of 64th (London) Medium Rgt in 5 AGRA could make contact with them. Shortly afterwards 251 Bty began shelling the presumed HQ of the German 6th Parachute Division, probably the first shots fired by British artillery into Germany. While the HAA troop left to take up an anti-shipping role on the river, the regiment was rejoined by 6 Bofors guns of E Trp, 326 LAA Bty for AA defence of the vital Nijmegen bridges.

During the next few days of the battle the regiment was called on for fire missions in several different directions, supporting 82nd Airborne, 50th (Northumbrian) and 43rd (Wessex) Divisions as well as Guards Armoured. Its RASC platoon bringing up ammunition found the main road cut by the enemy and had to take to side roads to get through to the gun positions. The regiment also suffered casualties from anti-personnel bombs dropped by German jet fighters.

On 5 October, 84th Med Rgt bolstered 59 AGRA supporting US 101st Airborne Division in repelling German attacks from the direction of Wageningen and Renkum. On 7 October the regiment moved to Ewijk, where it fired against German attacks simultaneously to the NE and NW, and then the following day to Ubbergen, near Groesbeek. From 15 October to 8 November, the regiment formed part of 59 AGRA.

==== Rhineland ====
When Lt-Gen Brian Horrocks, commander of XXX Corps, was given the newly arrived US 84th Division to carry out a difficult attack at Geilenkirchen on 18 November (Operation Clipper), 'I was determined that they should have every possible assistance ... so ... I gave them ... above all the support of my superb corps artillery'. 84th Medium Rgt was directly attached to 84th Division, its FOOs up with the US infantry units. A major part of its role was counter-mortar (CM) fire against identified German positions codenamed GOOSE, DUCK, GOAT and FOX, while air observation post (AOP) aircraft flew overhead identifying firing hostile batteries to be engaged by a battery of 84 Med Rgt if required.

During December the regiment was at Brunssum, where it received three OP tanks. When the German attack in the Ardennes (the Battle of the Bulge) threatened to break through US forces, 84th Med Rgt was assigned to Guards Armoured Division on 15 December and moved south via Tilburg to take up blocking positions. It returned to 5 AGRA command on 29 December when the danger had passed. On 4 January 84th Med Rgt was assigned to support an attack on the northern side of the German 'bulge' by 53rd (Welsh) Division ('Operation Smash III') and generally to assist VII US Corps.

At the beginning of February, XXX Corps began preparing for a major offensive in the Reichswald (Operation Veritable), and the regiment moved back from the Ardennes on bad roads to the Eindhoven and Malden area. 5 AGRA moved into its assembly area on the night of 5/6 February, then 84th Medium Rgt took up its position south-west of Groesbeek by last light on 7 February. A complex fire support programme was worked out for the attack on 8 February. 84th Medium Rgt was assigned to counter-battery (CB) fire and then in direct support of the assault on Kranenburg and Galgensteeg by 15th (S) Division, switching to support 3rd Canadian Division in the afternoon, and then back to 15th (S) Division in the evening as it penetrated the Siegfried Line under artificial moonlight.

During this long battle, the regiment supported 15th (S) Division in Operation Spider on 18 February, II Canadian Corps on 19 February, 44th (Lowland) Bde of 15th (S) Division during Operation Grenade on 23 February, and then 158th Bde of 53rd (W) Division during Operation Leek to capture Weeze on 24 February.

==== Germany ====
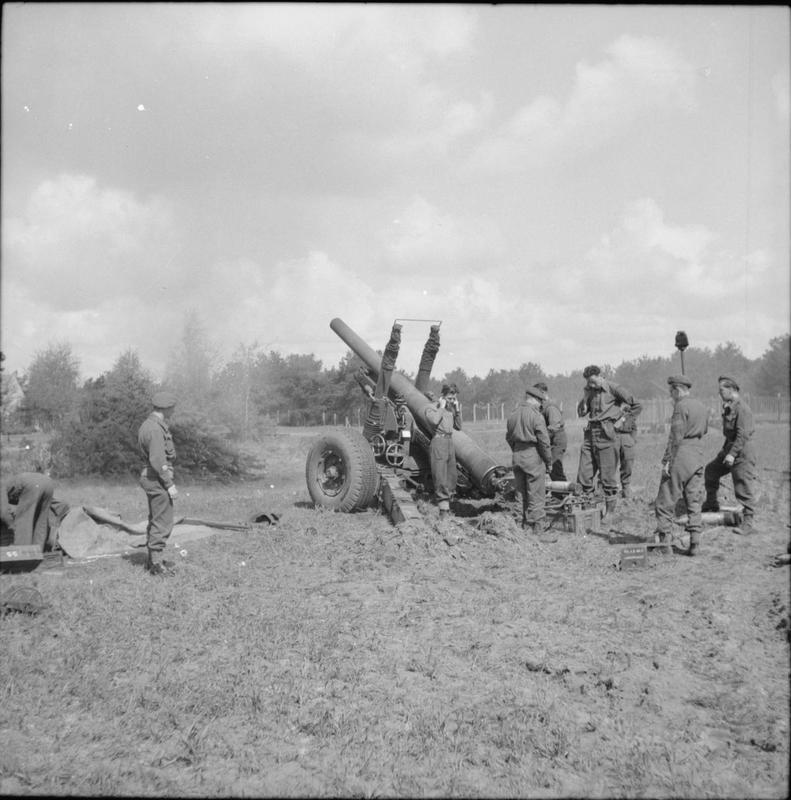
5.5-inch gun of 5 AGRA firing at Bremen, 24 April 1945.

XXX Corps provided massive artillery support for the Rhine Crossing (Operation Plunder) on the night of 23/24 March. Around 150 German guns had been identified on the corps' frontage, and the medium regiments of 5 AGRA began firing CB tasks ('DROOP I' and 'DROOP II') at 17.00, four hours before H-hour. Major Martin Lindsay of 1st Battalion, Gordon Highlanders, described the 'continuous ripple of slams and bangs as all our guns, stretching across so many fields behind, were firing', and the 'tremendous rumble of guns behind us, their shells whistling over us'. Then 30 minutes before H-hour 84th Med Rgt was switched to bombardment in support of the assault troops of 51st (Highland) Division.

Once the Rhine was crossed, XXX Corps advanced rapidly across Germany towards Bremen. 84th Medium Rgt was detached from 5 AGRA during these operations and was variously attached to Guards Armoured and to 3rd Division. On 31 March the Grenadier Guards Group of 32nd Guards Brigade was ordered to seize crossing over the River Berkel; 'To make assurance doubly sure three companies made the assault simultaneously, supported by the entire Leicestershire Yeomanry and a troop of the 84th Medium Regiment, which was now attached to the brigade'.

The regiment was with 3rd Division when it crossed the Weser. At the beginning of May, the regiment was still carrying out CB, CM and harassing fire tasks for 51st (H) Division attacking towards Bremervörde, even though ammunition was running short as the RASC had to bring it long distances from across the Weser. At 17.30 on 4 May the regiment received the order that all shooting was to stop, and cease fire was ordered at 08.00 the following morning after the German surrender at Lüneburg Heath came into effect.

After VE Day the regiment went to Sandbostel, where 250 Bty became responsible for running a Displaced persons camp of Russians. On 30 May, the regiment moved to Blankenburg (RHQ), Braunlage (250 Bty) and Hasselfelde (251 Bty) in the Harz Mountains to carry out occupation duties. In the autumn of 1945, it moved to Lüneburg where it became responsible for law and order.

The regiment was placed in suspended animation in 1946.

=== 114th (Sussex) Field Regiment ===
114th Field Regiment mobilised in 12th (Eastern) Infantry Division, the 2nd Line duplicate of 44th (HC) Division, but when the division moved to France in April 1940 it was only intended for labour duties and the RA units remained behind in the UK. After the Dunkirk evacuation the 12th Division was broken up, and on 6 July 114th Fd Rgt joined 2nd London Division (shortly afterwards designated 47th (London) Division). This formation was in Eastern Command, moving to South Wales by September 1940, but by May 1941 was defending the vital West Sussex sector of the anti-invasion defences.

The regiment formed its third battery on 17 December 1940, and this was numbered 479 Fd Bty in January 1941., giving it the following organisation:

114th (Sussex) Field Regiment, RA

- 231 (Bexhill) Fd Bty
- 232 (Hailsham) Fd Bty
- 479 Fd Bty

The regiment left 47th Division on 28 November 1941 and became an Army Field Regiment in Southern Command. It was granted the 'Sussex' subtitle of its parent regiment on 17 February 1942.

==== India and Ceylon ====
In February 1942, 114th (Sussex) Fd Rgt was assigned to the War Office Reserve preparatory to going overseas. The regiment then sailed to India, arriving at Bombay on 11 May and moving via Secunderabad to Bangalore where it joined 20th Indian Division. In July 1942 the division was sent to garrison Ceylon, where it remained for a year.

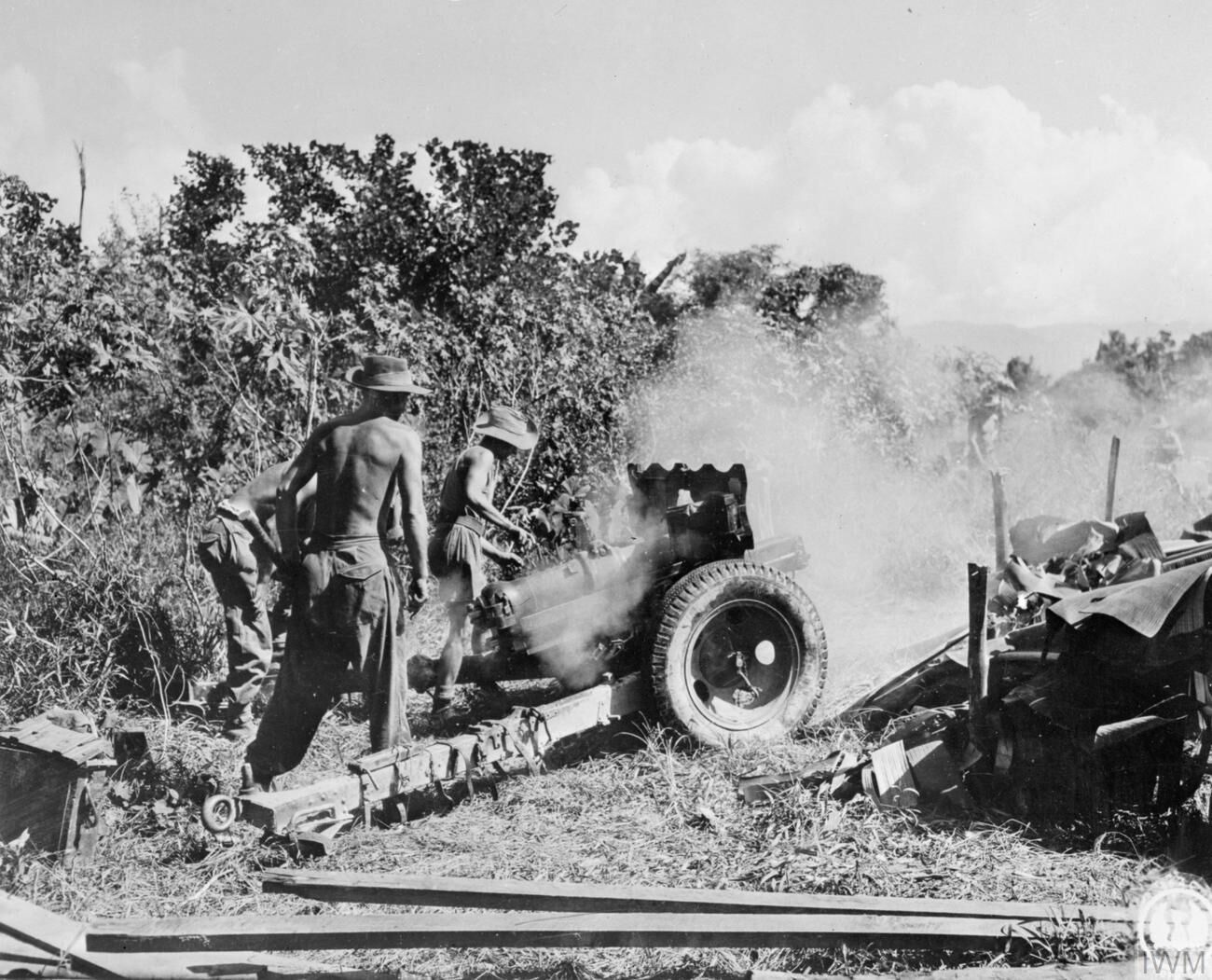
3.7-inch Howitzer in action in Burma, 1944.

On 19 July 1943, the 20th Indian Division returned to India and proceeded to Ranchi, the base for the Central Front in the Burma Campaign, where 114th Fd Rgt was converted into a jungle field regiment. This was organised with 231 Bty equipped with 16 x 3-inch mortars and 232 and 479 Btys each with 8 x 3.7-inch howitzers. The conversion was complete by September.

==== Burma ====
In November, 144th Jungle Fd Rgt moved up to the Manipur road on the Burma–Assam border with the division, where it remained in reserve during the early part of the 1943–44 campaign. In January 1944, the regiment was temporarily converted to infantry, forming part of 100th Indian Brigade, but on 20 March, as the great battle of Kohima–Imphal began in March it was once more operating as a jungle field regiment. The division was defending the Kabaw Valley 50 miles to the south of the main fighting, later withdrawing to the Pelal–Shenam area.

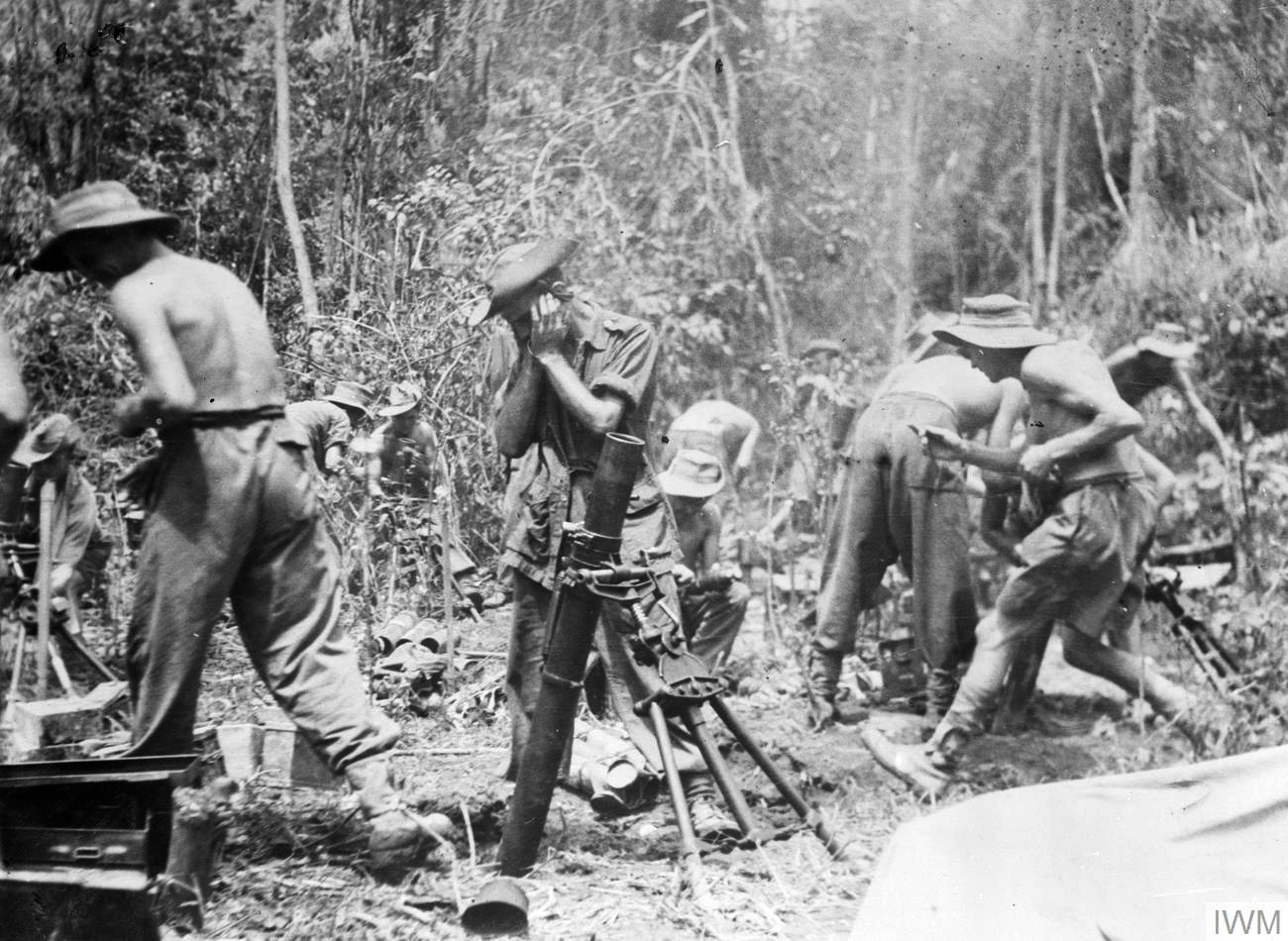
3-inch Mortar in action during the battle of Kohima-Imphal.

On 12 April, 114th Jungle Fd Rgt and the rest of 20th Divisional artillery supported 80th Indian Brigade's successful attack on 'Nippon Hill' and then defeated the inevitable counter-attack. During the night of 16 April the Japanese regained Nippon Hill and made a major effort to get through the Shenam Pass, but the line held and the Japanese got no further towards Palel. In mid-May the division's 32nd Indian Brigade moved forward to block the Tiddim Road and destroy Japanese supply convoys. The Japanese counter-attacked vigorously, breaking through to attack 32nd Indian Bde's rear areas around Bishenpur and cut off 17th Indian Division's HQ. 32nd India Bde sent up a mixed force from Bishenpur including a battery of 114th Jungle Fd Rgt. This held off the attacks for four days, when Brigadier E.G Woods of 50th Indian Parachute Brigade took command and it became known as 'Woodforce'. After three more days of heavy fighting against Woodforce, the Japanese abandoned their guns and withdrew.

Once Imphal had been relieved, 20th Indian Division took part in the pursuit to the Chindwin River during July, through terrible conditions of rain, mud, and sickness. At the end of July, the 20th Division was withdrawn to a rest area at Wangjing and the Kabaw Valley.

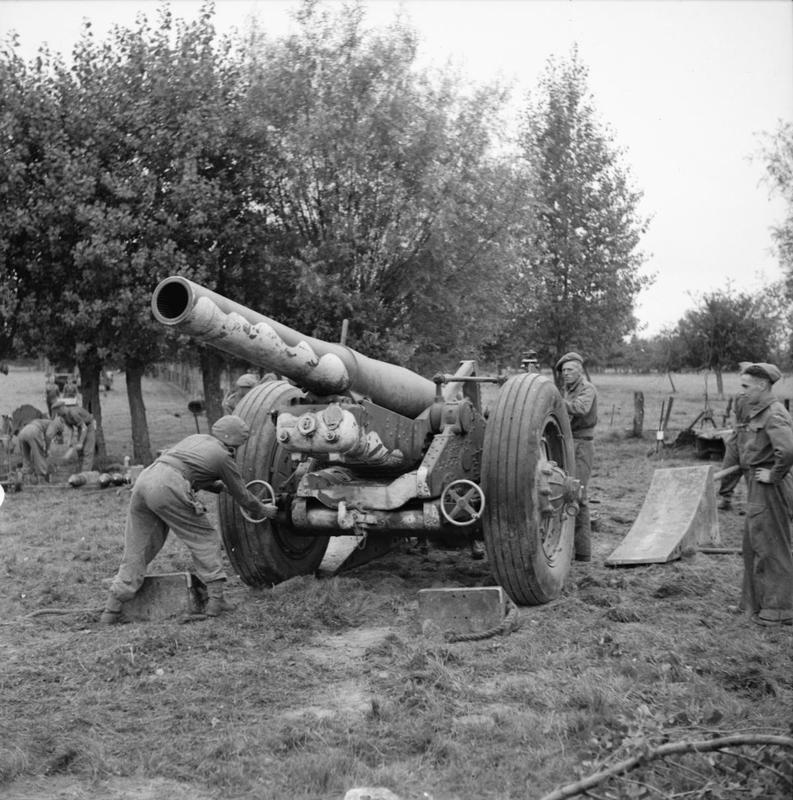
7.2-inch howitzer

After some months' rest, the advance was renewed in December 1944. 114th Field Rgt had reverted to 24 x 25-pounder guns, with an additional troop of 7.2-inch howitzers. The division's task was to capture Monywa and be ready to cross the Irrawaddy River and attack Mandalay from the south. It reached Maukkadaw on 26 December and headed for Waunggyo and Paluzawa where it made contact with the enemy. The division then hit very bad country, recrossed the Chindwin and moved down the west bank to Kin where it crossed over again to begin its advance on Monywa, which it reached on 14 January 1945 and captured by 22 January. It then began to prepare for the Irrawaddy crossing. 114th Field Rgt took part in the corps artillery plan to support the crossing of both 2nd British and 20th Indian Divisions. 100th Indian Bde began crossing during the night of 12/13 February 1945, and then 32nd Indian Brigade followed. There was bitter fighting in the bridgehead, but 114th Field Rgt was able to cross on 21 February (the rest of the divisional artillery crossed on 5 March). In the following weeks of fighting, 20th Indian Division captured Kyaukse and cut off the retreat of the Japanese garrison of Mandalay. By 14 March it was up to the Panlaung River, and then was ordered to switch direction towards Meiktila where a major battle was developing.

As the division advanced towards Prome during May, the roads were infested with small enemy parties, which had to be winkled out using guns and infantry in close cooperation. On 1 June 1945, 20th Indian Division was transferred to Twelfth Army, which was being assembled for Operation Zipper (the amphibious invasion of Malaya). However, there was still some mopping up to do in the Irrawaddy Valley before the division could leave for retraining.

==== Indo-China ====
When the Japanese surrender came in August 1945, Operation Zipper was cancelled and the troops assembled for it were instead transported to different locations in South East Asia to receive the handover from Japanese occupying forces; 20th Indian Division was flown to Saigon in French Indochina, beginning on 9 September. The division's advanced guard moved into the city on 13 September, finding law and order breaking down, and the rest of the division was flown in, 114th Fd Rgt beginning to arrive on 6 October. The first officer of the regiment to arrive was given a Jeep with a Japanese driver, and an AOP aircraft with a Japanese pilot. The troops were distributed around the country to disarm those Japanese soldiers not required for internal security, and to maintain peace. On one occasion 321 Bty was ambushed at Biên Hòa near Saigon.

The regiment moved to Singapore on 14 January 1946 and was then stationed at Kangar Kahang in Malaya. 114th (Sussex) Field Regiment was disbanded on 11 January 1947.

== Postwar ==
In 1947, the regiment was reformed in the reconstituted TA as 258 (Sussex) Heavy Anti-Aircraft Regiment, RA, at Eastbourne, forming part of 99 (AA) AGRA, which became 99 Anti-Aircraft Brigade the following year. On 14 May 1950, the regiment was redesignated as 258 (Sussex) Light Anti-Aircraft Regiment, RA.

On 10 March 1955, Anti-Aircraft Command was disbanded and there was a reduction in the number of anti-aircraft units. On that day, 258 LAA Rgt merged with 313 (Sussex), 344 (Sussex Yeomanry) and 641 (Sussex) Heavy Anti-Aircraft Regiments to form 258 (Sussex Yeomanry) Light Anti-Aircraft Regiment, RA. The former 258 LAA Rgt provided S Battery at Eastbourne to the new regiment. In 1961, the new regiment merged with 257 (County of Sussex) Fd Rgt (with P Bty at Bexhill and Eastbourne).

== Uniforms and Insignia ==
The full dress of the original artillery volunteers was based on that of the RA, but for ordinary parade the men wore a loose undress tunic and trousers of blue Baize. The 4th Battery of the 6th (Hastings) AVC, however, wore a naval uniform with sailors' caps until 1872. The badge of the Cinque Ports artillery volunteers was the Coat of arms of the Cinque Ports surrounded by a circlet. On officers' pouches the circlet carried the motto 'PRO ARIS ET FOCIS' (For hearths and homes); on later tunic buttons and belt clasps shared with the rifle volunteers the circlet was inscribed 'CINQUE PORTS VOLUNTEERS'.

== Honorary Colonels ==
The following served as Honorary Colonel of the unit:

- 1st Earl Brassey, GCB, later Lord Warden of the Cinque Ports, commissioned as 2nd Lieutenant in 6th (Hastings) Cinque Ports AVC 1 June 1861, later Captain 9th (Pevensey) Cinque Ports AVC, appointed Hon Col 2 December 1891.
- Lt-Col A.C. Roberts, TD, appointed 12 May 1921.
- Capt Viscount Gage, Coldstream Guards, appointed 17 June 1936.

== Memorials ==
There is a WWI memorial to the 2nd Home Counties Bde at Eastbourne Redoubt, and another to 4th (Sussex) Bty of the brigade at St Mary's Church, Eastbourne. Also in St Mary's is a WWII memorial to 58th and 114th (Sussex) Fd Rgts and 84th Med Rgt.
