= Stuart Greeves =

Sir Stuart Greeves KBE CB DSO MC
- Born: 2 April 1897
- Died: 1989 (aged 91–92)
- Military career
- Allegiance: United Kingdom
- Branch: British Army; British Indian Army
- Rank: Major-General
- Service number: 15451
- Units: Northamptonshire Regiment; Lancashire Fusiliers; 82nd Punjabis; Royal Indian Army Service Corps
- Commands: 80th Indian Infantry Brigade
- Conflicts: World War I World War II
- Awards: Knight Commander of the Order of the British Empire; Companion of the Order of the Bath; Distinguished Service Order and bar; Military Cross and bar

Major-General Sir Stuart Greeves KBE CB DSO and Bar, MC & Bar (2 April 1897 – 1989) was a British Indian Army officer. He served in World War I and World War II.

== Military career ==
Born 2 April 1897 in Northampton, Greeves was educated at Northampton Town and County Grammar School. When the First World War broke out, he enlisted as a private in the 7th Battalion, Northamptonshire Regiment on 14 September 1914. He served in France & Belgium from 31 August 1915 to 24 August 1916. and was commissioned as a temporary second lieutenant with the Lancashire Fusiliers on 25 January 1917. He returned to France with the 18th Battalion Lancashire Fusiliers on 3 March 1917 and served there until 21 August 1918. He was awarded the Military Cross when serving with the 18th battalion for actions around 25 to 28 March 1918 and the Bar to his Military Cross for actions around 1 June 1918 whilst the Intelligence Officer of the 18th battalion. He applied to join the Indian Army and was appointed on probation on 25 September 1918 and was appointed to the temporary rank of lieutenant on 25 October 1918.

Greeves was attached to 2nd Battalion, 152nd Punjabis and saw service during the Third Anglo-Afghan War in 1919. He was admitted to the Indian Army on 29 October 1919 and confirmed in the rank of lieutenant and was posted to the 82nd Punjabis but transferred to the Supply and Transport Corps on 8 October 1921. In 1923 the Supply and Transport Corps was renamed the Indian Army Service Corps and in 1935 the prefix Royal was added. He was promoted to captain on 26 September 1922, and promoted to brevet major on 1 July 1934. He attended Staff College, Quetta between 1930 and 1931. Subsequently he was appointed officiating Staff Captain, Directorate of Supplies and Transport on 3 December 1931 and then Brigade Major, Wana Brigade from 16 August 1932 to 15 August 1936. Promoted to the substantive rank of major on 26 September 1935, he served on the North West Frontier from 1936 to 1937.

Greeves was attached to the Directorate of Supplies and Transport on 26 November 1936. During the period 1938 to 30 May 1939 he served with 15 Independent Mechanical Transport Section and then as officer commanding 3 Motor Ambulance Unit. He was appointed General Staff Officer 2nd grade from 1 June 1939 to 13 March 1942 with Rawalpindi District Headquarters in India. and appointed an Officer of the Order of the British Empire as Major, RIASC, for service in Waziristan during 1940. and also mentioned in despatches as Major, RIASC, for service in Waziristan during 1940.

Greeves was promoted to acting colonel on 1 September 1943, to substantive lieutenant-colonel on 26 September 1943. and to temporary colonel and temporary brigadier on 1 March 1944. He commanded the 80th Indian Infantry Brigade of 20th Indian Division in Burma from January 1944 to March 1945 and was awarded the Distinguished Service Order as Temporary Brigadier, RIASC, for his service in Burma and a medal bar to his Distinguished Service Order as temporary Brigadier, RIASC, also for his service in Burma.

Greeves was advanced to Commander of the Order of the British Empire as temporary Brigadier, RIASC, for his service in Burma, and also Mentioned in despatches three times. He was promoted to colonel on 1 January 1947 with seniority from 26 September 1946, and then promoted to acting major general during 1947 and to substantive major general on 1 October 1947 with seniority from 22 June 1947. He was appointed a Companion of the Order of the Bath (Kings Birthday Honours) as Major-General, Special List, Ex-Indian Army. He retired from the Special List (ex-Indian Army) on 1 September 1948 but remained on the Special List while employed with the Pakistan Army. On 24 December 1947 he was posted as Quarter Master General of the Pakistan Army and remained in that role until 5 November 1948.

In November 1948 Greeves was appointed to command the Bahawalpur State Forces which were then reformed, under his command, as 6 (Bahawalpur) Division, Pakistan Army. From January 1951 he was appointed the senior military advisor to the Commander in Chief of the Pakistan Army. Appointed a Knight Commander of the Order of the British Empire as Major-General, Special List, Ex-Indian Army he ceased to be employed with Pakistan Army 15 April 1957 and retired.

== Citation for Bar to Distinguished Service Order ==
Brigadier (Temporary) Stuart Greeves CBE, DSO, MC

Brigadier Greeves commanded 80th Indian Infantry Brigade of 20th Indian Division. After the capture of Monyra on 22 January 1945, his Brigade was ordered to clear the large area of the Irrawaddy and Chidwin confluence up to the Habet River and deceive the enemy into believing that a crossing was to take place in that area. This difficult task he planned and carried out most admirable and achieved his both his objects by hard fighting and tireless manoeuvre, during which he himself was always right forward, enthusing his troops and setting a wonderful example of fearlessness and dash, at all times completely regardless of his own safety, and quite indifferent to the fire of the enemy artillery, automatics and snipers to which he was subjected in each of the many actions fought by his Brigade.

Later, after a small bridgehead had been established across the Irrawaddy, he disengaged his Brigade with great skill and speed, and crossed over into the bridgehead; and thanks to fine planning, determination and speed, inflicted defeat after defeat on the Japanese, not only in close battle in the bridgehead area itself, but in a lightning sweep which carried his Brigade in four days over 35 miles of difficult country through the enemy’s artillery area, completely disorganizing it and various units of the 31st and 53rd Japanese Divisions to a position to threaten seriously the main Mandalay – Meiktila Road near Kyaukse. His troops killed a great number of the enemy during this drive, destroyed many dumps of ammunition, petrol and supplies, and captured no less than eleven guns most of whose crews fought them to the last. As usual, Brigadier Greeves was in the forefront of all the actions fought. He has throughout shown all the qualities of a great and fearless leader, and has carried out with his Brigade in one month the many difficult tasks given to him in such a brilliant way that he is most thoroughly deserving of the immediate award of a Bar to the Distinguished Service Order.
