= 20th Indian Infantry Division =

- Formation sign of the 20th Indian Infantry Division.
- Active: 1942–1945
- Country: India
- Allegiance: British Empire
- Branch: British Indian Army
- Type: Infantry
- Size: Division
- Engagements: Burma Campaign; War in Vietnam (1945-1946)

Commanders
- Notable commanders: Major General Douglas Gracey

The 20th Indian Infantry Division was an infantry division of the Indian Army in the Second World War, formed in India, and took part in the Burma Campaign during the Second World War. After the war, the bulk of the division was deployed to French Indochina to oversee the handover from Japanese to French rule. For nearly all is operational life the division was commanded by Major-General Douglas Gracey.

== Formation ==
The division was formed at Bangalore in April, 1942. It was commanded by Major-General Douglas Gracey and at first it consisted of the Indian 32nd, 51st and 53rd Brigades. In July that year, the 51st and 53rd Brigades were detached to form the Indian 25th Infantry Division and replaced by the Indian 80th Infantry Brigade and Indian 100th Infantry Brigade (the latter brigade being transferred from the 34th Division which had recently disbanded in Ceylon). The division was intended from the start for operations in jungle and mountain and was on a Mixed Animal and Mechanical Transport establishment for maintenance in rough country.

The division's insignia was a hand wielding a tulwar, in white on black. After training in Southern India and Ceylon, the division joined Indian XV Corps at Ranchi in Bihar in December but from July 1943 it was transferred to IV Corps in Imphal.

== Battle of Imphal ==
At the start of the Battle, the 20th Indian Division was deployed forward to Tamu in the Kabaw Valley. To avoid being cut off, it retreated to the Shenam Saddle in the hills surrounding the Imphal Plain. Because the 17th Indian Infantry Division was in difficulty in its sector, the 32nd Brigade was temporarily detached to it. With other detachments, the 20th Division was reduced to only five battalions, to defend the Saddle against the Japanese Yamamoto Force.

During April and the first part of May, the division held the saddle against attacks by infantry, tanks and heavy artillery. It was then relieved in place and ordered to counter-attack, north-east from Imphal to Ukhrul. The monsoon had broken and movement was very difficult. After several Japanese counter-attacks, at the start of July the division was transferred to the XXXIII Indian Corps and slowly eliminated large numbers of Japanese in and around the village, which had been made into a Japanese communication and logistic centre.

== Battle of Central Burma ==
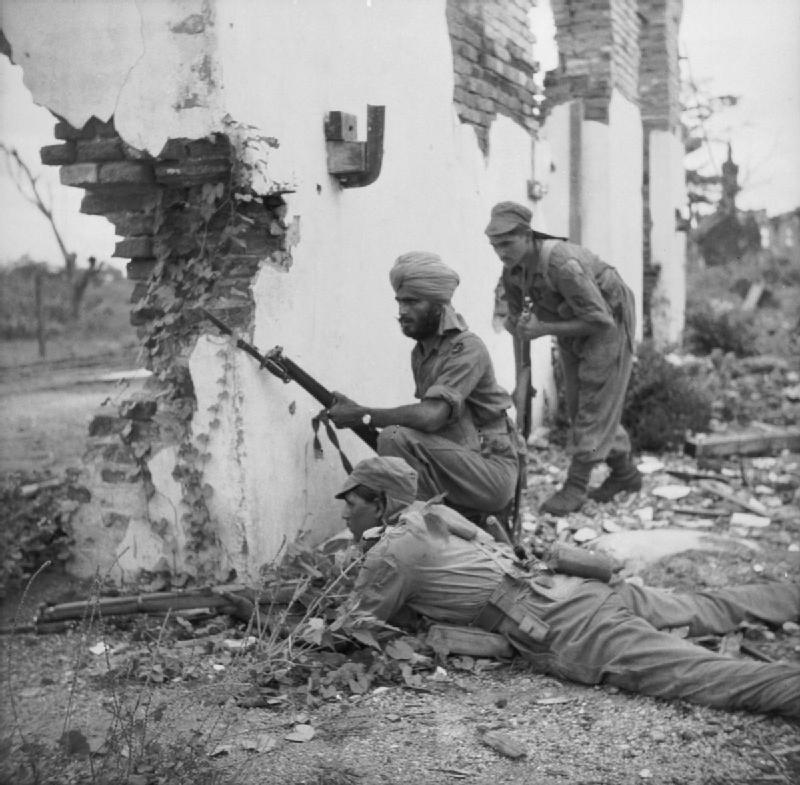
Men of the 20th Division search for Japanese in Prome, Burma (3 May 1945)

During the remainder of the monsoon, the division rested around Dimapur. As the monsoon ended, it moved into a bridgehead across the Chindwin River at Kalewa. It attacked southward on 4 December and cleared Japanese rearguards from Monywa. On 13 February 1945, the division made a crossing of the Irrawaddy River 20 miles (32 km) west of Mandalay. The boats used were leaky and other items of equipment already worn out. The first precarious footholds were counter-attacked every night for a week but eventually linked up into a solid bridgehead. On 13 March, the 20th Division attacked southward, gaining immediate success against the understrength Japanese 31st Division. A column formed from the divisional reconnaissance unit and an attached tank unit, known as Claudecol, reached far into the Japanese rear, before turning north and mopping up the disorganised enemy.

== Southern Burma ==
In early April, two brigades were converted to lorried infantry by acquiring the vehicles of the British 2nd Infantry Division which was being withdrawn to India. The division fought its way southward along the east bank of the Irrawaddy, until it met units of the XV Indian Corps, which had occupied Rangoon in Operation Dracula. During this period the 22nd (East Africa) Infantry Brigade was attached to the division, from 28 June to 11 August 1945.

== Indochina ==
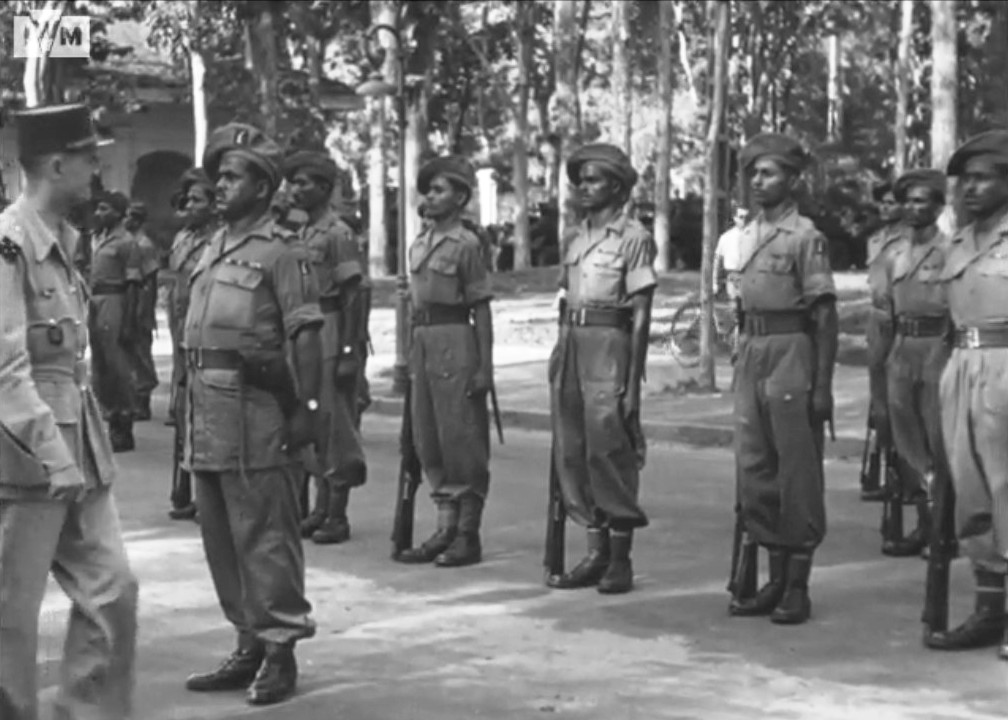
General Leclerc reviews troops of the 20th Indian Division, Saigon, French Indochina, 22 December 1945.

In August 1945, the Japanese surrendered after two atomic weapons were dropped on Hiroshima and Nagasaki. The Allied South East Asia Command (SEAC) area of responsibility, was expanded to embrace several countries including French Indochina. While Chinese Nationalist troops occupied the northern part of the country, Gracey's division occupied the southern part in Operation Masterdom. The division was to release former Allied prisoners of war and disarm and repatriate Japanese units. Later, the division was instructed to hand over to the returning French regime, before returning to India. There were several battles with Viet Minh, who were intent on achieving independence. Major Richard Holbrook McGregor, on Gracey's Intelligence Section Staff, learned of an impending Viet Minh attack on Saigon. Gracey, never one to mince his words, criticised the French for their dismissive attitude towards his Indian and Gurkha units. The division was disbanded in India in 1946.

== Order of battle ==
The 20th Indian Division was constituted as follows in 1944–45: Note the division's British battalions were removed in April 1945

General Officer Commanding:Major-General Douglas Gracey
Artillery

Commander, Royal Artillery:Brigadier J. A. E. Hirst
9th Field Regiment, RA
114th (Sussex) Jungle Field Regiment, RA
115th (North Midland) Field Regiment, RA (on transfer from 19th Indian Division on 14 June 1942, later rejoined 19th Indian Division)
23rd Mountain Regiment, IA
55th Light Anti-Aircraft/Anti-Tank Regiment, RA (later became 111th Anti-Tank Regiment, RA)

Engineers

92nd, 422nd, 481st Field Companies, IE
309th Field Park Company, IE
9th Bridging Section, IE

Signals

20th Indian Infantry Division Signal Regiment

'Divisional infantry

4th Battalion, 3rd Madras Regiment (Divisional HQ battalion 1944)
4th Battalion, 17th Dogra Regiment (HQ battalion 1945)
4th Battalion, 2nd Gurkha Rifles (Reconnaissance battalion from March 1945)
Machine Gun Battalion, 9th Jat Regiment (Divisional Machine gun unit)

'32nd Indian Infantry Brigade' (Brigadier David Alexander Laurance Mackenzie; Brig E.C.J Woodford from 25 March 1945)

1st Battalion, Northamptonshire Regiment (To 36th Division April 1945)
9th Battalion, 14th Punjab Regiment
1st Battalion, 1st Gurkha Rifles (From 36th Division April 1945)
3rd Battalion, 8th Gurkha Rifles

'80th Indian Infantry Brigade' (Brigadier Stuart Greeves; Brig D.E. Taunton from 18 March 1945)

1st Battalion, Devonshire Regiment (To 36th Division April 1945)
9th Battalion, 12th Frontier Force Regiment(Major Mian Hayauddin MBE)
1st Battalion, 19th Hyderabad Regiment (From 36th Division April 1945)
3rd Battalion, 1st Gurkha Rifles

'100th Indian Infantry Brigade' (Brigadier William Arthur Lester James; Brig C.H.B. Rodham 1945)

2nd Battalion, Border Regiment (To 36th Division April 1945)
2nd Battalion, 8th Punjab Regiment (From 36th Division April 1945)
14th Battalion, 13th Frontier Force Rifles
4th Battalion, 10th Gurkha Rifles

'Medical

42nd, 55th, 59th Indian Field Ambulances

'Divisional Units'

604th Field Security Section

== Sources ==
- Allen, Louis (1984). Burma: the Longest War 1941–45. London: Dent Publishing. ISBN 0-460-02474-4.
- Cole, Howard (1973). Formation Badges of World War 2. Britain, Commonwealth and Empire. London: Arms and Armour Press.
- Latimer, Jon (2004). Burma: The Forgotten War. London: John Murray. ISBN 0-7195-6576-6.
- Slim, Field Marshal Viscount (1972) [1956]. Defeat into Victory. London: Cassell. ISBN 0-304-29114-5.
- Maj-Gen S. Woodburn Kirby, History of the Second World War, United Kingdom Military Series: The War Against Japan Vol III, The Decisive Battles, London: HM Stationery Office, 1961.
- Maj-Gen S. Woodburn Kirby, History of the Second World War, United Kingdom Military Series: The War Against Japan Vol IV, The Reconquest of Burma, London: HM Stationery Office, 1955.
