= 17 Mountain Division (India) =

17th Mountain Division
- Formation badge of the 17th Mountain Division.
- Active: 1960–present 1941–1946
- Country: India (British Raj) British India (1941–1946)
- Allegiance: India; British Empire (1941–1946)
- Branch: Indian Army; British Indian Army (1941–1946)
- Type: Infantry
- Size: Division
- Garrison/HQ: Gangtok
- Nickname: "The Black Cat Division"
- Engagements: Second World War; Burma Campaign; Battle of Bilin River; Battle of Meiktila; Burma Campaign 1944; Battle of Imphal; Annexation of Goa
- Battle honours: Burma

Commanders
- Current commander: Major General M S Rathore, VSM
- Notable commanders: Sir John Smyth; David Tennant Cowan; WA Crowther; KP Candeth; Sagat Singh; Siri Kanth Korla; N. S. Raja Subramani; Ram Chander Tiwari; KVS Lalotra; K T Patnaik; R C Chopra; Ajay Seth; Amit Kabhytal

The 17th Infantry Division is a formation of the Indian Army. During the Second World War, it had the distinction of being continually in combat during the three-year-long Burma Campaign (except for brief periods of refit). The division was re-raised in 1960 and the 17 Mountain Division is presently located in Sikkim under XXXIII Corps.

== Second World War ==
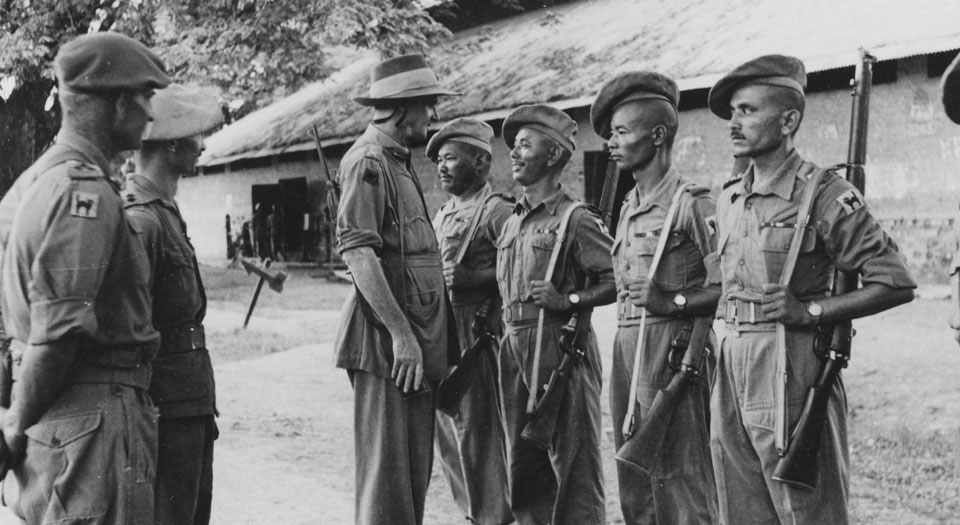
Major General Sir Frank Messervy inspects troops of the 17th Infantry Division in Burma, 1944.

The division was first raised at Ahmednagar, India under the command of Major General H V Lewis CB CIE DSO MC in 1941. It consisted then of the 44th, 45th and 46th Indian Infantry Brigades, and was intended to garrison Iraq. At the end of the year, war with Imperial Japan broke out and the division was split; 44th and 45th Brigades were despatched to Malaya where 45th Brigade fought in the Battle of Muar before both brigades were lost in the Battle of Singapore. The 46th Brigade and the division HQ went to Burma, where the Division was reinforced by 16th Indian Infantry Brigade and took 2nd Burma Infantry Brigade under command.

=== 1942 ===
The Japanese attacked Burma on 22 January 1942. It was soon apparent that the British and Indian troops in Burma were too few in number, wrongly equipped and inadequately trained for the terrain and conditions. After failing to hold the Kawkareik Pass, Moulmein and Kuzeik, the division fell back to the Bilin River, where it was joined by 48th Indian Infantry Brigade.

The Bilin was not a proper defensive position, and the division tried to retreat over the Sittang River. Air attacks, poor organization and vehicle breakdowns delayed the division, and Japanese parties infiltrated around them to threaten the vital bridge over the Sittang. The division's commander, Major General "Jackie" Smyth VC, was forced to order the bridge to be destroyed, with most of the division cut off on the far side of the river. Only a few thousand men without equipment succeeded in crossing the river. Smyth was dismissed and replaced by Major General Cowan.

The division was reinforced with the 63rd Indian Infantry Brigade, and narrowly escaped being trapped in Rangoon. After trying to hold a front in the Irrawaddy River valley, the division subsequently retreated north into Assam just before the monsoon broke, fighting off a Japanese attempt to trap it at Kalewa.

=== 1943 ===
For the campaigning season of 1943, the division was reorganised as a "Light" formation, with two brigades only (48th and 63rd), supported by mountain artillery, and with mules and jeeps only for transport. It disputed the mountainous and jungle-covered region around Tiddim, with mixed success. The division was at the end of a long and precarious supply line, and the "light" establishment was found to be inadequate in some respects. Some heavier equipment and transport was restored.

=== 1944 ===
In 1944, the Japanese launched a major invasion of India. During the long Battle of Imphal, the 17th Division first successfully fought its way out of encirclement at Tiddim, and then disputed the vital Bishenpur sector south of Imphal (with 32nd Indian Infantry Brigade temporarily under command). In July, the Japanese were broken by heavy casualties and starvation, and retreated. Some units of the 17th Division had suffered nearly 100% casualties.

During the late monsoon season, the division was temporarily withdrawn to India and reorganised once again. The 48th and 63rd Brigades were fully equipped with vehicles to become Motorized infantry. The 99th Indian Infantry Brigade was added to the division, equipped to be transported by Douglas DC-3 aircraft.

=== 1945 ===
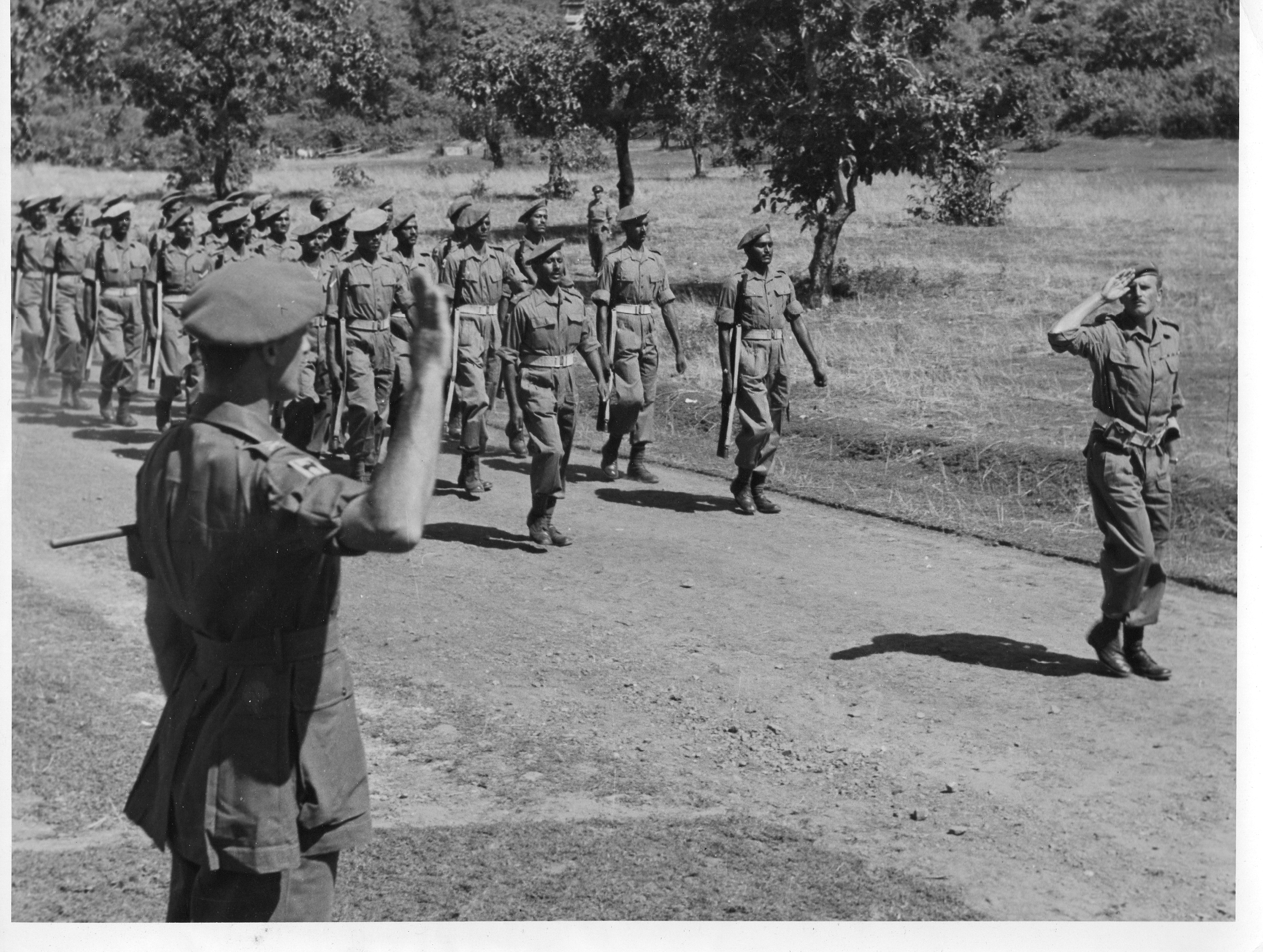
Major General W. A. Crowther, GOC 17th Indian Division, takes the salute at a March Past after the surrender ceremony, 1945.

In late February 1945, the motor elements of the division, with the bulk of 255th Indian Tank Brigade under command, crossed the Irrawaddy River and advanced on the vital Japanese communications centre of Meiktila. Joined by the 99th Indian Infantry Brigade which was flown into the captured airfield at Thabutkon, they captured Meiktila in only four days. Reinforced by the 9th Indian Infantry Brigade which was flown into the airfields around Meiktila, they subsequently withstood a Japanese siege. This Battle of Meiktila largely destroyed the Japanese armies in Central Burma.

The division now broke the last Japanese defensive position at Pyawbwe, and advanced south on Rangoon. At Pegu, it pushed Japanese rearguards aside, but was still short of its objective when the monsoon broke. Rangoon fell to an assault from the sea, Operation Dracula.

In the last months of the campaign, the division participated in the mopping up of Japanese stragglers in Burma. After the war ended, elements of it formed part of the Commonwealth Occupation force in Japan (under Cowan). The division was disbanded in India in 1946.

== Order of Battle, as of 1 May 1944 ==
General Officer Commanding – Major General David Tennent Cowan
Commander, Royal Artillery – Brigadier the Baron de Robeck

17 Division HQ and Signals

48th Indian Infantry Brigade – (Brigadier Ronald Thomas Cameron)

9th Battalion, Border Regiment
2nd Battalion, 5th Gurkha Rifles
1st Battalion, 7th Gurkha Rifles

63rd Indian Infantry Brigade – (Brigadier Arthur Edward Cumming )

1st Battalion, 3rd Gurkha Rifles
1st Battalion, 4th Gurkha Rifles
1st Battalion, 10th Gurkha Rifles

Divisional Units

1st Battalion, West Yorkshire Regiment (attached)
4th Battalion, 12th Frontier Force Regiment (Divisional reconnaissance unit)
7th Battalion, 10th Baluch Regiment (Divisional defence / machine gun unit)

129th (Lowland) Jungle Field Regiment, Royal Artillery (RA)
21st Mountain Regiment, Indian Artillery (IA)
29th Mountain Regiment, IA
82nd Light Anti-aircraft / Anti-tank Regiment RA

60th Field Company, Indian Engineers (IE)
70th Field Company, IE
Tehri Garhwal Field Company
414th Field Park Company IE

== Assigned brigades ==
All these brigades were assigned or attached to the division at some time during World War II

- 44th Indian Infantry Brigade
- 45th Indian Infantry Brigade
- 46th Indian Infantry Brigade
- 2nd Burma Infantry Brigade
- 16th Indian Infantry Brigade
- 48th Indian Infantry Brigade
- 7th Armoured Brigade
- 63rd Indian Infantry Brigade
- 37th Indian Infantry Brigade
- 49th Indian Infantry Brigade
- 32nd Indian Infantry Brigade
- 50th Indian Parachute Brigade
- 99th Indian Infantry Brigade
- 255th Indian Tank Brigade
- 9th Indian Infantry Brigade

== Post independence ==
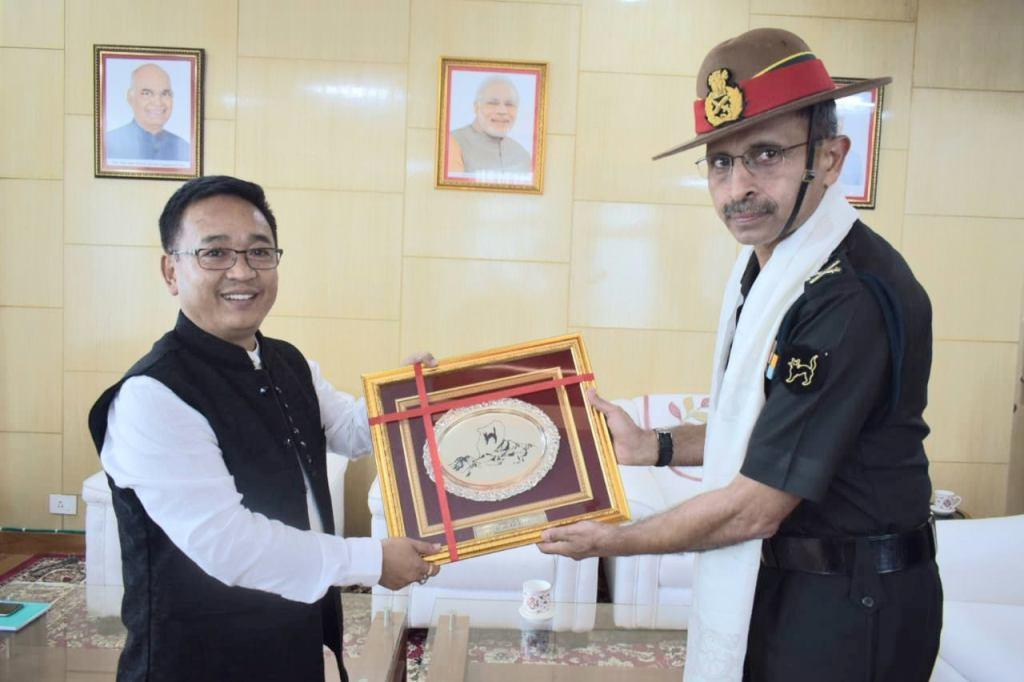
Major General RC Tiwari, GOC 17 Mountain Division, meets the Chief Minister of Sikkim Mr PS Golay in June 2019

The division was re-raised at Ambala (India) on 15 November 1960, under the command of Major General K S Katoch MC. Among its new formations was the 99 Infantry Brigade, which was soon detached for service with ONUC in the Congo.

=== Operations ===
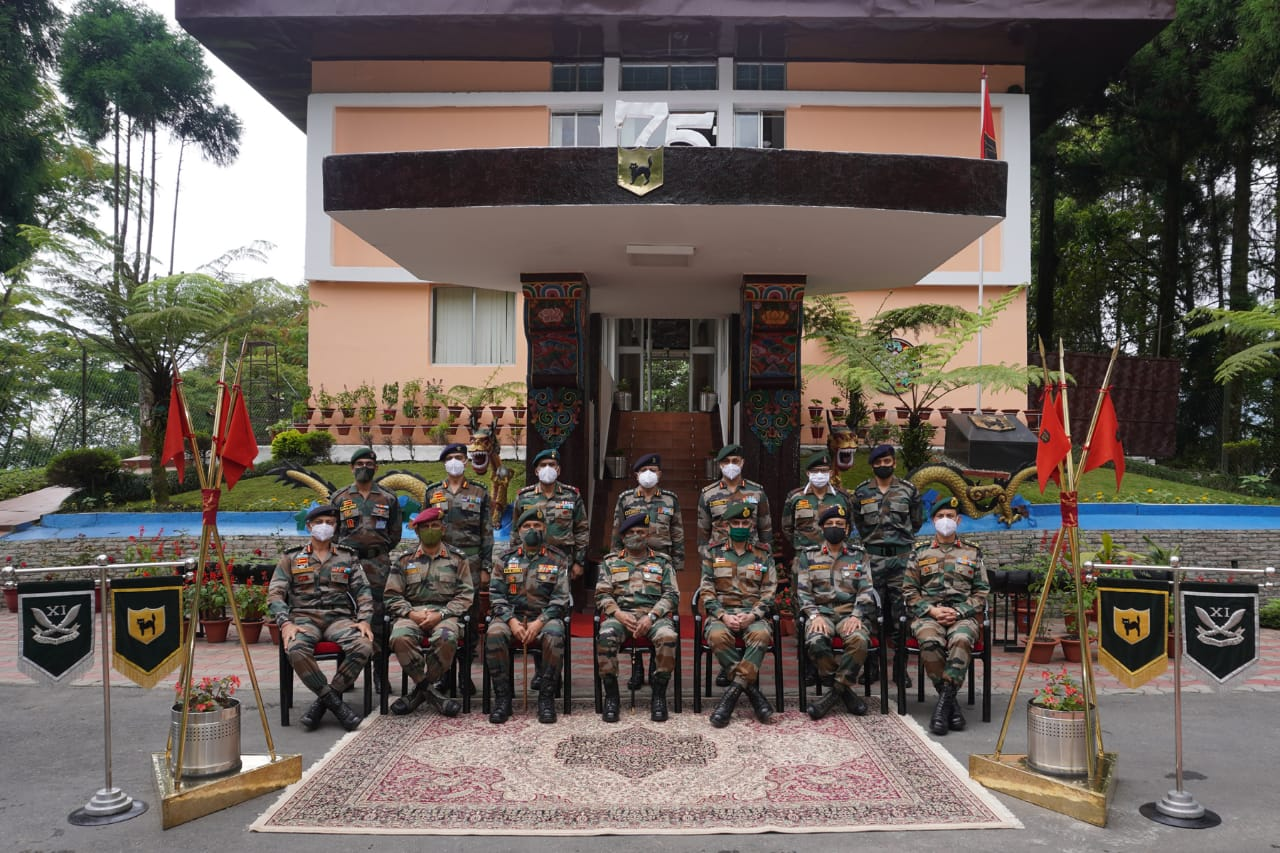
Lieutenant General Manoj Pande, GOC-in-C, Eastern Command visiting Black Cat Division, June 2021.

- Operation Vijay - The division under the command of Major General KP Candeth moved from Ambala and participated in the Goa military operations in 1961. It had two brigades under its command - the 63rd Brigade and the 48th Brigade. The swift operations between 17 and 19 December 1961 culminated in the surrender by the Portuguese. General Candeth was immediately appointed Goa's first Indian administrator (acting as the Military Governor), a post he held till June 1962.
- Sikkim - On 15 November 1963, the division relocated to Sikkim and took on the role of guarding a portion of the Tibet-India border. Under the then GOC, Major General Sagat Singh, it performed credibly during the Nathu La and Cho La clashes of 1967. The formation also played a role in the merger and statehood of Sikkim in 1975. The division is presently deployed in East and South East Sikkim. It was involved in the Doklam standoff in 2017.

== Formation Sign ==
The division had two different formation signs. The first was a lightning bolt (white) on a blue background. This was used until the middle of 1942. Major General CT Cowan decided to change the formation sign to a black cat on a yellow/orange background. It is said that the General wanted to motivate his troops to fight back the Japanese and he felt that no one fights more fiercely and aggressively than a cornered cat. The division is sometimes called The Black Cat Division based on its second and current formation sign. The present formation sign has a black background signifying an infantry division and black cat drawn with a yellow outline.
