= 100th Indian Infantry Brigade =

- Active: April 1920–August 1945
- Disbanded: August 1945
- Country: (British Raj) British India
- Allegiance: British Empire
- Branch: British Indian Army
- Type: Infantry
- Size: Brigade
- Engagements: World War II: Burma Campaign

Commanders
- Notable commanders: F.M. Moore; W.A.L. James; C.H.B. Rodham

The 100th Indian Infantry Brigade was an infantry brigade formation of the Indian Army during World War II. It was formed in April 1920 at Jhansi. The brigade was assigned to the 34th Indian Infantry Division until June 1943, when it was transferred to the 20th Indian Infantry Division until the end of the war. It was known for its participation in Battle of Imphal or known as "Imphal Campaign" where it fought along with other Indian Infantry regiments converged to form the 20th Indian Division and drove back the Japanese Army back to Burma inflicting heavy losses. This was a turning point in the Burma Campaign, part of South-East Asian theatre of World War II.

== Order of battle ==
The following units served with the brigade:

- 9th Battalion, 12th Frontier Force Regiment April 1941 to July 1942 and March to April 1944.
- 9th Battalion, 14th Punjab Regiment April 1941 to June 1943.
- 14th Battalion, 13th Frontier Force Rifles April 1941 to August 1945.
- 2nd Battalion, Border Regiment July 1942 to April 1945.
- 4th Battalion, 10th Gurkha Rifles June 1943 to November 1944 and December 1944 to July 1945 and August 1945.
- 114th (Sussex) Jungle Field Regiment, Royal Artillery January to March 1944 (serving as infantry).
- 4th Battalion, 2nd Gurkha Rifles April to August 1945.
- 1st Battalion, 1st Gurkha Rifles April to August 1945.

== See also ==
- List of Indian Army Brigades in World War II
