= 99th Mountain Brigade =

- Active: 1941–1945; 1960–present
- Country: India
- Allegiance: Republic of India
- Branch: Indian Army
- Size: Brigade
- Engagements: Burma Campaign, Congo Crisis

The 99th Mountain Brigade, formerly the 99th Indian Infantry Brigade, is an infantry formation of the Indian Army.

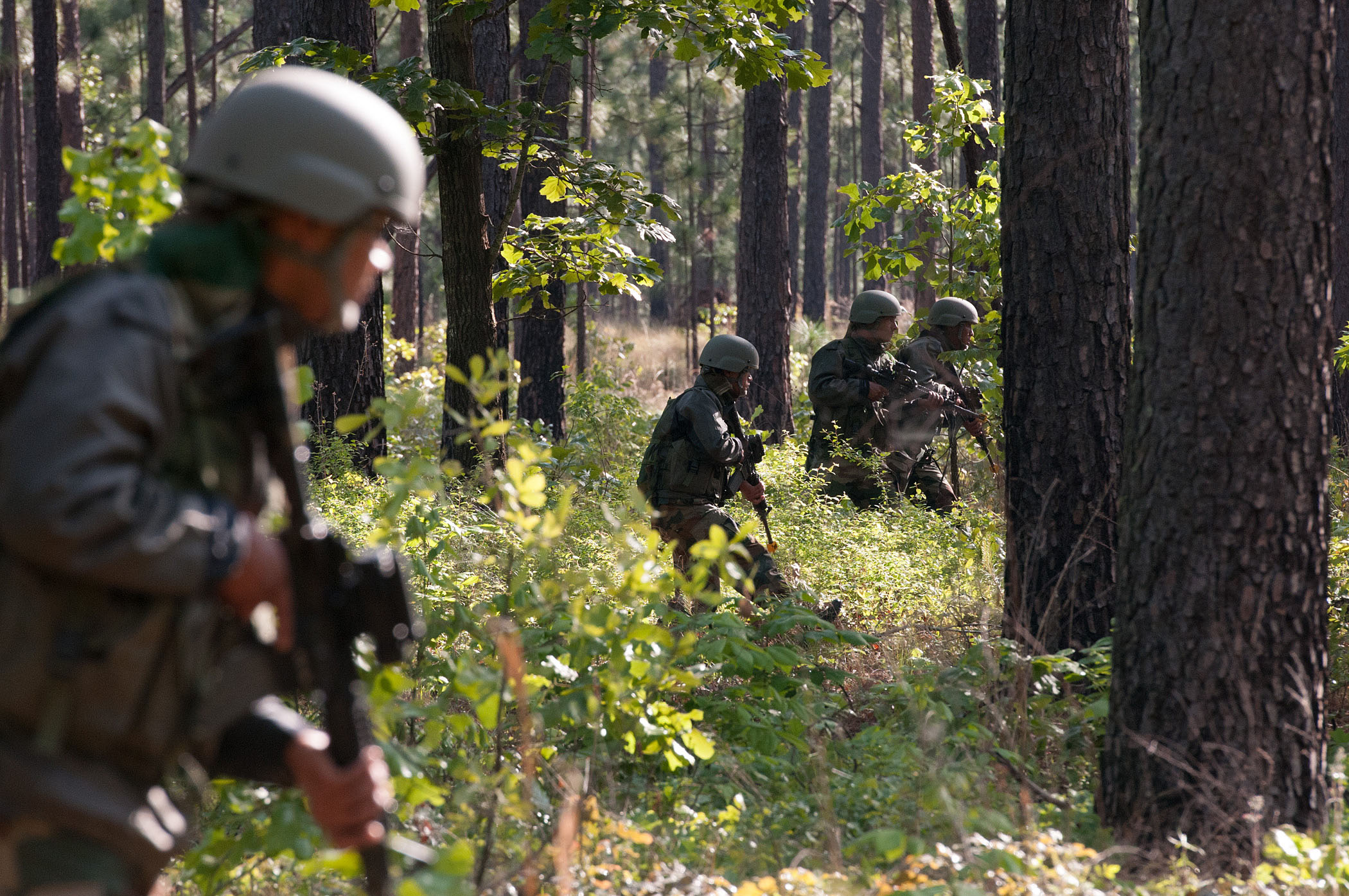
99th Mountain Brigade soldiers during a training exercise alongside the United States Army, 2013

The brigade was formed in April 1941 at Lucknow. The brigade was then assigned to the 34th Indian Infantry Division in October 1941, and formed part of the garrison of Ceylon. In October 1944, the brigade was reassigned to the 17th Indian Infantry Division and took part in the Burma Campaign. In June 1945 it was temporarily attached to the 19th Indian Infantry Division before returning to the 17th Division in August.

The unit was re-raised 15 November 1960 at Ambala for the 17th Infantry Division. It was detached from the division and served in the Congo with ONUC from 1961 to March 1963. A squadron of 63 Cavalry served with the brigade in the Congo. In the Congo during the first rotation, 2 Jat, 3/1 Gorkhas, and 1st Battalion the Dogra Regiment formed the first set of infantry battalions, and 2/5 GR [FF], 4th Battalion Rajputana Rifles, and 4th Battalion, the Madras Regiment, the second contingent, from 1962-63. The unit was converted as 99th Mountain Brigade and assigned to the 6th Mountain Division in 1963.

== Units during World War II ==
- 6th Battalion, 15th Punjab Regiment to April 1945
- 9th Battalion, 8th Punjab Regiment May 1941 to May 1944
- 6th Battalion, 16th Punjab Regiment November 1941 to March 1944
- 26th Battalion, 17th Dogra Regiment March to August 1944
- 1st Battalion, Sikh Light Infantry May 1944 to August 1945
- 1st Battalion, 3rd Gurkha Rifles August 1944 to August 1945
- 1st Battalion, East Yorkshire Regiment April to August 1945

== See also ==
- List of Indian Army Brigades in World War II
