= 46th Indian Infantry Brigade =

- Active: 1941–1942
- Country: British India
- Allegiance: British Crown
- Branch: British Indian Army
- Size: Brigade
- Engagements: Battle of Sittang Bridge

The 46th Indian Infantry Brigade was an Infantry formation of the Indian Army during World War II. The brigade was formed in June 1941, at Ahmednagar in India and assigned to the 17th Indian Infantry Division. In February 1942, during the Japanese conquest of Burma the Brigade suffered heavy casualties during the retreat to the Sittang River and was dispersed into small groups after the Battle of Sittang Bridge. The Brigade was never reformed and officially disbanded 25 February 1942.

== Formation ==
- 3rd Battalion, 7th Gurkha Rifles
- 7th Battalion, 10th Baluch Regiment
- 5th Battalion, 17th Dogra Regiment

Also attached in February 1942

- 4th Battalion, Burma Rifles
- 2nd Battalion, King's Own Yorkshire Light Infantry
- 2nd Battalion, Duke of Wellington's Regiment

== See also ==
- List of Indian Army Brigades in World War II
