= Gulf of Martaban =

Arm of the Andaman Sea in the southern part of Burma

Coordinates: 16°31′15″N 97°00′45″E

Designations

Ramsar Wetland
- Official name: Gulf of Mottama
- Designated: 10 May 2017
- Reference no.: 2299

The Gulf of Martaban (Burmese: မုတ္တမပင်လယ်ကွေ့) or the Gulf of Mottama is an arm of the Andaman Sea in the southern part of Burma. The gulf is named after the port city of Mottama (formerly known as Martaban). The Sittaung, Salween and Yangon rivers empty into it.

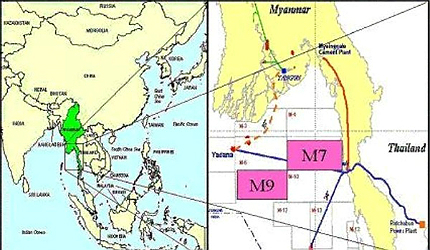
Map of Gulf of Martaban

A characteristic feature of the Gulf of Martaban is that it has a tide-dominated coastline. Tides ranges between 4–7 m with the highest tidal range at the Elephant Point in the western Gulf of Martaban.

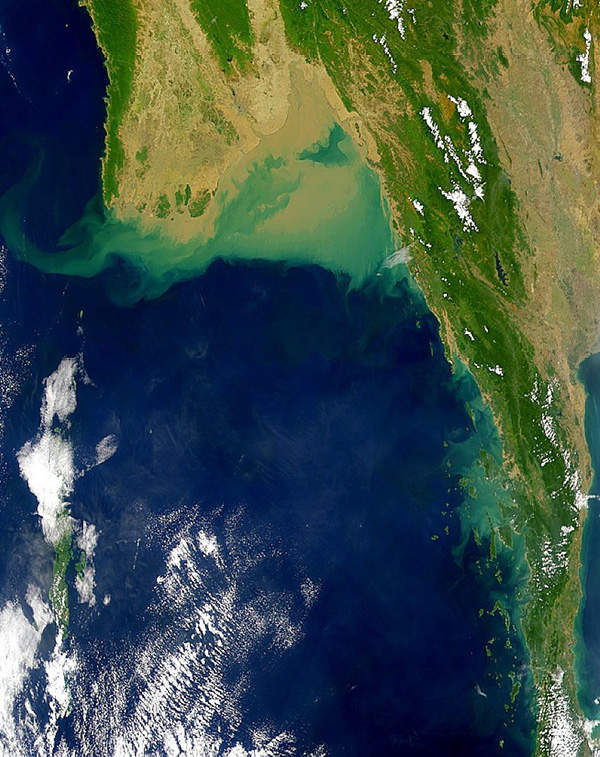
Satellite picture of Gulf of Martaba

During spring tide, when the tidal range is around 6.6 m, the turbid zone covers an area of more than 45,000 km^{2} making it one of the largest perennially turbid zones of the world's oceans. During neap tide, with tidal range of 2.98 m, the highly turbid zone coverage drops to 15,000 km^{2}. The edge of the highly turbid zone migrates back-and-forth in-sync with every tidal cycle by nearly 150 km.

The gulf is home to varieties of species and the Eden's whale was scientifically recognized in the water.

In 2008, the region was found to be rich with oil deposits. It has been a site of oil exploration since 2014 under the "Zawtika development project", an international consortium of American, British, French, Chinese, Thai, Indonesian (PT Gunanusa) and Indian oil and construction companies exploring oil in M7, M9 and M11 blocks.
