= 32nd Indian Infantry Brigade =

- Active: 1941–1945
- Country: British India
- Allegiance: British Crown
- Branch: British Indian Army
- Size: Brigade
- Engagements: Burma Campaign

The 32nd Indian Infantry Brigade was an infantry brigade formation of the Indian Army during the Second World War. It was formed in January 1941 in India and assigned to the HQ Western Independent District until April 1942. It was then assigned to the 20th Indian Infantry Division until the end of the war, with short attachments to the 23rd Indian Infantry Division in April 1944 and the 17th Indian Infantry Division from April to July 1944.

== Composition ==
- 8th Battalion, 1st Punjab Regiment July 1941 to January 1942
- 5th Battalion, 19th Hyderabad Regiment October 1941 to July 1942
- 3rd Battalion, 8th Gurkha Rifles April 1942 to August 1945
- 4th Battalion, 10th Gurkha Rifles April 1942 to June 1943
- 1st Battalion, Northamptonshire Regiment July 1942 to April 1945
- 9th Battalion, 14th Punjab Regiment June 1943 to August 1945
- 1st Battalion, 4th Gurkha Rifles April to May 1944
- 4th Battalion, 2nd Gurkha Rifles November to December 1944 and April 1945
- 1st Battalion, 1st Gurkha Rifles April 1945
- 1st Battalion, 19th Hyderabad Regiment June to July 1945

== See also ==
- List of Indian Army Brigades in World War II
