= David Tennant Cowan =

British army officer (1896–1983)

Major-General David Tennant Cowan CB CBE DSO & Bar MC DL
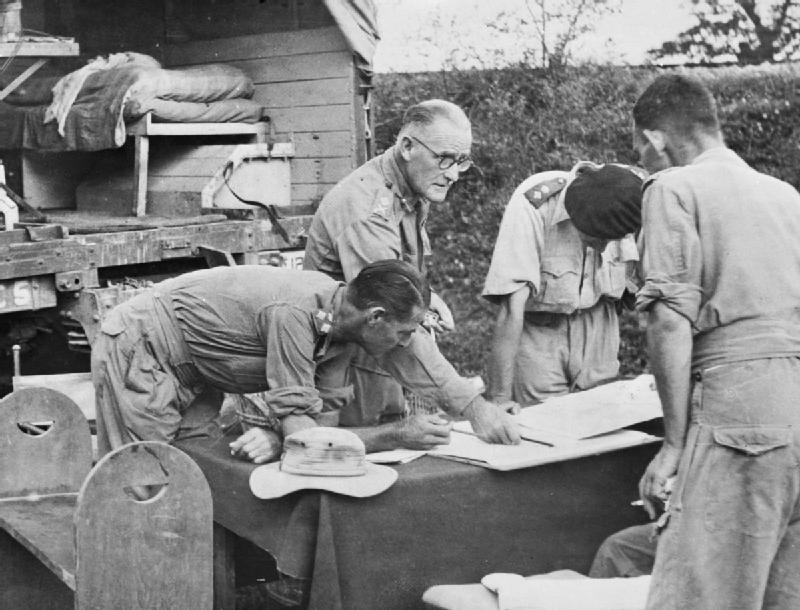
- Cowan (centre, wearing spectacles)
- Born: 9 October 1896; Málaga, Spain
- Died: 15 April 1983 (aged 86); Winchester, Hampshire
- Military career
- Allegiance: United Kingdom
- Branch: British Army; British Indian Army
- Service years: 1915–1947
- Rank: Major-General
- Nickname: "Punch"
- Service number: 13209
- Units: Argyll and Sutherland Highlanders; 6th Queen Elizabeth's Own Gurkha Rifles
- Commands: 17th Indian Infantry Division; 1st Battalion, 6th Queen Elizabeth's Own Gurkha Rifles
- Conflicts: First World War; Second World War
- Awards: Companion of the Order of the Bath; Commander of the Order of the British Empire; Distinguished Service Order & Bar; Military Cross; Mentioned in Despatches

Major-General David Tennant Cowan, CB, CBE, DSO & Bar, MC, DL (9 October 1896 – 15 April 1983), also known by his nickname "Punch", was a British army officer who served in the British Army and British Indian Army during the First and Second World Wars. He commanded the 17th Indian Infantry Division during almost the whole of the Burma campaign.

== Early career and inter-war years ==
Cowan was educated at Reading School and Glasgow University. He was commissioned into the Argyll and Sutherland Highlanders in August 1915, a year after the First World War began. Awarded the Military Cross and mentioned in despatches, he was attached to the Indian Army in 1917, his appointment being confirmed in March 1918 whilst serving with the 4th battalion 3rd Gurkha Rifles. He later joined the 6th Gurkha Rifles. The citation for his MC reads:

For conspicuous gallantry in action. He led his platoon with great dash against the enemy's trenches, and, when fired on by about five machine-guns, withdrew a short distance and dug himself in. He then returned, reported to his C.O., and led up another platoon to reinforce his own.

Between the wars, he served on the North-West frontier (where he was again mentioned in despatches for service in Waziristan) and in various staff positions. From 1932 to 1934, he was the Chief Instructor at the Indian Military Academy and in 1937 he was once more mentioned in despatches during a further tour of duty in Waziristan. By the outbreak of World War II, he was in command of the 1st Battalion, 6th Gurkha Rifles.

== Field hockey ==
Cowan also played field hockey in regimental army teams in United Kingdom and India. He was appointed the captain of the Indian Army national field hockey team for their first international tour of New Zealand and Australia in 1926. He also served as the team manager for the tour.

== Second World War ==
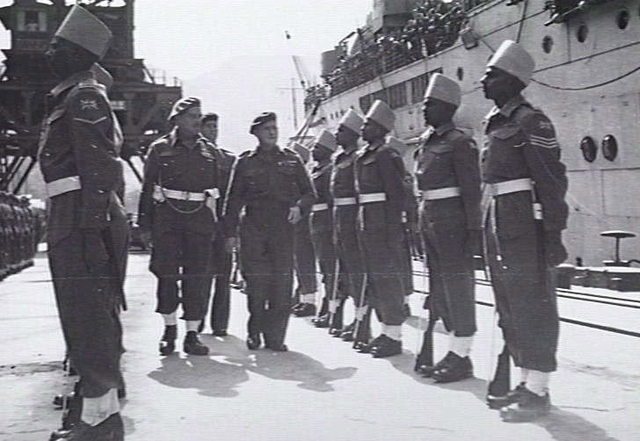
Cowan inspecting Indian troops at Kure, 30 March 1946

He was appointed a General Staff Officer, 1st grade in India from 18 September 1940 to 17 February 1941. Appointed acting brigadier, he was Director of Military Training in India from 18 February 1941 to 30 September 1941, then deputy director of Military Training in India 1 October 1941 to 14 December 1941, then Director of Military Training in India from 15 December 1941 to 1 March 1942. When the Japanese invaded Burma, he was posted to Rangoon, initially as a staff officer in Burma Army HQ with rather ill-defined duties, but was appointed acting Major-General and commander of the Indian 17th Infantry Division when its previous commander, Jackie Smyth VC, was relieved after a bridge was blown behind the retreating division and much of it was cut off.

He remained in command of the division for the rest of the Burma Campaign: during the retreat into India, the fighting around Tiddim in 1943, the Battle of Imphal in 1944 and the drive into Central Burma in 1945. Early in 1945, his son was killed whilst serving as an officer in Cowan's old unit (1/6 Gurkha Rifles). He fought the decisive Battle of Meiktila having suffered this loss, although only a few close friends were aware of it. For his leadership in Burma he was twice awarded the Distinguished Service Order. His army commander, Bill Slim, was later to write about Cowan's handling of the Meiktila battle:

Cowan's handling of this difficult and divided battle was impressive...throughout he was alert to every change in the situation on any sector... his firm grip on his own formations and on the enemy never faltered.

He was promoted to the rank of substantive Major-General on 12 February 1945. A fine picture of the soldier's life, fighting in his Division, is found in George MacDonald Fraser's memoir Quartered Safe Out Here (London, Harvill 1993). He was intended to lead the Indian army contingent of the Commonwealth Corps being tentatively formed to participate in the planned invasion of Japan. The surrender of Japan changed these plans, and Cowan instead led the joint British-Indian division BRINDIV, part of the British Commonwealth Occupation Force, in Japan. In 1947, he handed over command of this force and retired from the army.

== Career summary ==
- Commissioned 3rd (Special Reserve) Battalion Argyll & Sutherland Highlanders (1915)
- Transferred to 6th Gurkha Rifles, British Indian Army (1917)
- Attended Command and Staff College, Quetta (1927–1928)
- Assistant Military Secretary, India (1930–1932)
- Chief Instructor at Indian Military Academy (1932–1934)
- General Staff Officer 2, India, Waziristan (1936–1938)
- Commanding Officer 1st Battalion 6th Gurkha Rifles (1939–1940)
- General Staff Officer 1, India (1940–1941)
- Deputy Director of Military Training, India (1941–1942)
- General Officer Commanding Indian 17th Infantry Division, Burma (1942)
- General Officer Commanding 17th Indian Light Division, Burma (1942–1944)
- General Officer Commanding 17th Indian Division, Burma (1944–1945)
- General Officer Commanding Force152 (1945)
- General Officer Commanding BRINJAP Division, Japan (1945–1947)
- Retired (1947)

== Bibliography ==
- Ammentorp, Steen. "Generals of World War II".
- Houterman, Hans; Koppes, Jeroen. "World War II unit histories and officers".
- "Orders of Battle.com". Archived from the original on 30 September 2007.
- Slim, William (1956). Defeat into Victory. London: Cassell.
- Mead, Richard (2007). Churchill's Lions: a biographical guide to the key British generals of World War II. Stroud: Spellmount. ISBN 978-1-86227-431-0.
- Smart, Nick (2005). Biographical Dictionary of British Generals of the Second World War. Barnsley: Pen and Sword Books. ISBN 1844150496.

Military offices
| Preceded by John Smyth | GOC 17th Indian Infantry Division; 1942–1945 | Succeeded by William Alan Crowther |
