= 80th Indian Infantry Brigade =

- Active: 1942–1945
- Country: British India
- Branch: British Indian Army
- Part of: 20th Indian Infantry Division
- Engagements: Burma Campaign

Commanders
- Notable commanders: Brigadier S Greeves; Brigadier DE Taunton; Brigadier GL Roberts; Lieutenant-Colonel DL Betts

The 80th Indian Infantry Brigade was an Infantry formation of the Indian Army during World War II. It was formed in April 1942, in India and assigned to the 20th Indian Infantry Division until the end of the war.

== Composition ==
- 2nd Battalion, Border Regiment May to July 1942
- 1st Battalion, Devonshire Regiment May 1942 to April 1945
- 1st Battalion, Northamptonshire Regiment May to July 1942
- 5th Battalion, 19th Hyderabad Regiment July 1942 to July 1943
- 9th Battalion, 12th Frontier Force Regiment July 1942 to February 1944 and April 1944 to April 1945
- 3rd Battalion, 1st Gurkha Rifles July 1943 to August 1945
- 4th Battalion, 2nd Gurkha Rifles March to April 1945
- 4th Battalion, 17th Dogra Regiment April to August 1945
- 1st Battalion, 19th Hyderabad Regiment April to August 1945
- 2nd Battalion, 8th Gurkha Rifles April to May 1945

== See also ==
- List of Indian Army Brigades in World War II
