= Sittaung River =

River in Myanmar

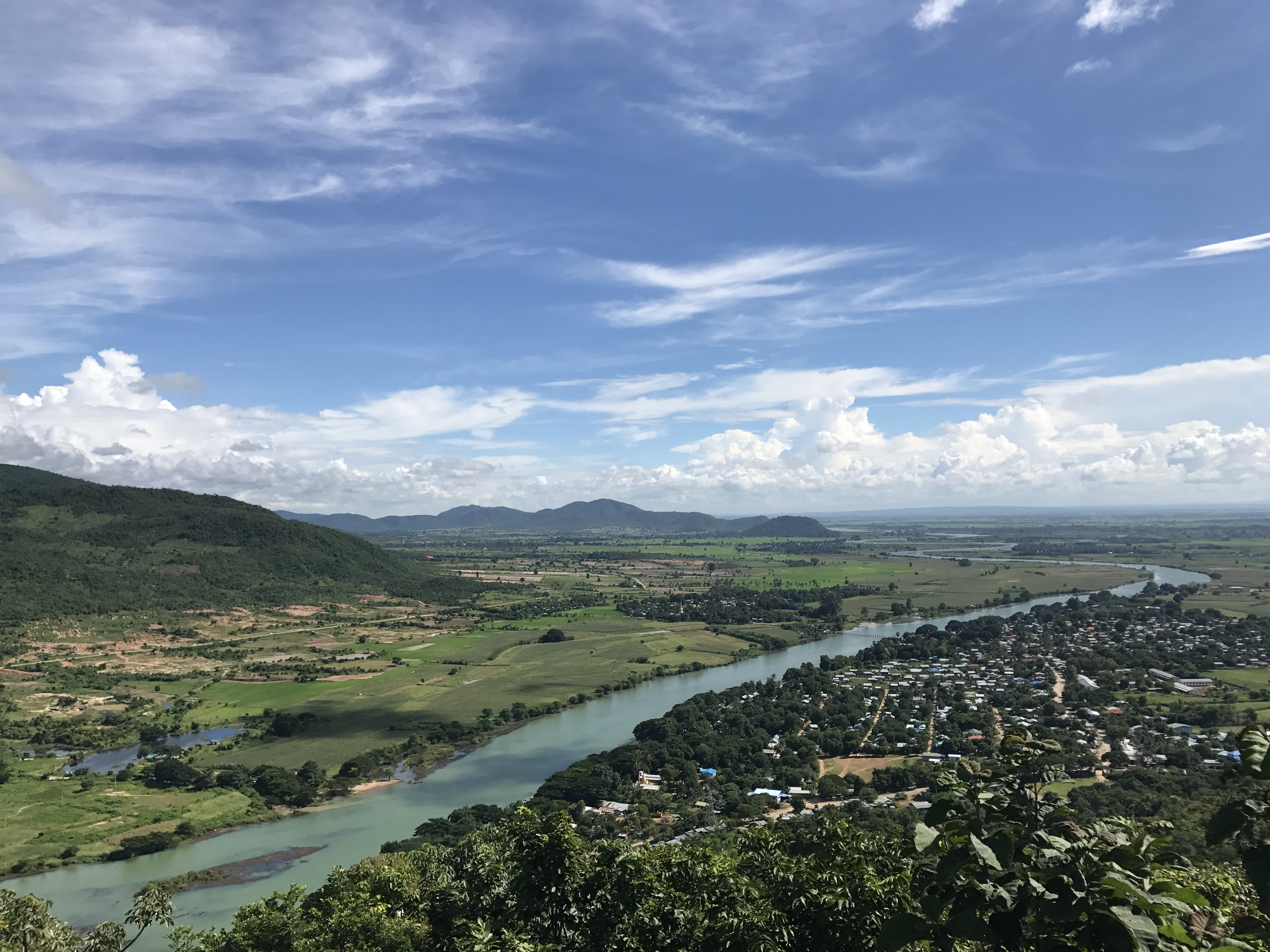
- Sittaung River near Pyinmana
- Native name: စစ်တောင်းမြစ် (Burmese)

Location
- Country: Myanmar, Bago Region

Physical characteristics
- Source
  - location: Shan Hills
- Mouth
  - location: Gulf of Mottama, Andaman Sea
  - coordinates: 16°57′54″N 96°59′15″E
  - elevation: 0 m (0 ft)
- Length: 420 km (260 mi)
- Basin size: 34,480 km^{2} (13,310 sq mi)
- Discharge
  - average: 1,542 m^{3}/s (54,500 cu ft/s)

The Sittaung River (Burmese: စစ်တောင်းမြစ် [sɪʔ táʊɰ̃ mjɪʔ]; formerly, the Sittang or Sittoung) is a river in south central Myanmar in Bago Division. The Pegu Range separates its basin from that of the Irrawaddy. The river originates at the edge of the Shan Hills southeast of Mandalay, and flows southward to the Gulf of Martaban. Its length is 420 kilometres (260 mi) and its mean annual discharge is around 50 cubic kilometres (12 cu mi) per year.

== Basin ==
Although it flows through fairly flat country, the Sittaung has a notorious tidal bore at its mouth which has precluded any but very small craft navigating the river. The river is navigable for 40 kilometres (25 mi) year-round and for 90 kilometres (56 mi) during three months of the year. The Sittaung empties into the Gulf of Martaban where the tide-dominated coast is a Ramsar wetland of international importance.

The river is used primarily to float timber south for export. Strong currents make the river even less valuable as a means of transport in eastern Burma. Its basin does not have the same richness for agriculture as the Irrawaddy because there is no soil flowing down from the Shan Hills.

== See also ==
- Battle of Sittang Bridge in 1942
