= Basil Hitchcock =

British army officer (1877–1938)

Lieutenant-General Sir Basil Hitchcock KCB DSO
- Portrait by Walter Stoneman, 1917
- Born: Basil Ferguson Burnett Hitchcock; 3 March 1877; Chatham, Kent, Kent, England
- Died: 23 November 1938 (aged 61); Mayfair, London, England
- Military career
- Allegiance: United Kingdom
- Branch: British Army; British Indian Army
- Service years: 1897–1930
- Rank: Lieutenant-General
- Commands: 55th (West Lancashire) Division; Deccan District
- Conflicts: Second Boer War; First World War
- Awards: Croix de Chevalier; Distinguished Service Order; Order of the Bath; Order of Saints Maurice and Lazarus; Croix de guerre
- Cricket career

Personal information
- Batting: Unknown
- Relatives: James Robertson (father-in-law)

Domestic team information
- Years: Team
- 1896: Hampshire

Career statistics
Competition	First-class
Matches	2
Runs scored	33
Batting average	11.00
100s/50s	–/–
Top score	21
Catches/stumpings	–/–
- Source: Cricinfo, 22 January 2010

Lieutenant-General Sir Basil Ferguson Burnett Hitchcock KCB DSO (3 March 1877 – 23 November 1938) was a British Army officer and an English first-class cricketer. Immediately after completing his education, Hitchcock played first-class cricket for Hampshire, making two appearances in the 1896 County Championship. His military career began in 1897 and lasted until his retirement with the rank of lieutenant-general in 1930. During his career in the British Army, he fought in both the Second Boer and First World War's. In the latter, he was the Director of Mobilization at the War Office, and later following the war, led the demobilisation efforts.

== Early life and military career ==
Hitchcock was the elder son of Colonel Burnett Hitchcock, of Weeke Manor, Winchester. He was born in March 1877 at Chatham, Kent. He was educated at Harrow School, Following his final year at Harrow, Hitchcock made two appearances in first-class cricket for Hampshire as a middle order batsman against Derbyshire and Yorkshire in the 1896 County Championship. In his two matches, he scored 33 runs with a highest score of 21. He would later concentrate on regimental cricket, where he was described by Christopher Sandford as "the best-dressed man on the park". From Harrow, he attended the Royal Military College at Sandhurst, notably passing out first and as a result being awarded the Commander-in-Chief's Sword and the Anson Memorial Sword. Hitchcock was subsequently commissioned as a second lieutenant into the Sherwood Foresters in February 1897, with promotion to lieutenant following in April 1898. Hitchcock served in the Second Boer War, during which he was appointed an Assistant Provost-Marshall with the local rank of captain with the South African Field Force in March 1900; he gained the full rank of captain in March 1901. Following the war, Hitchcock attended the Staff College at Camberley in January 1903. He was promoted from supernumary captain to captain in January 1905.

He would spend a decade on the staff, which included two years in Bermuda between 1910 and 1912.

== First World War and later life ==
Hitchcock would serve in the First World War in France with the Sherwood Foresters, which formed part of the British Expeditionary Force. Early in the war, he was awarded the Croix de Chevalier in recognition of his gallantry in operations between 21–30 August 1914, with Hitchcock also being appointed a Companion of the Distinguished Service Order (DSO) in December 1914. His DSO was earned during fighting near Hancourt in the First Battle of Ypres, when he fought while wounded and rallied his troops. He was made a brevet major in February 1915, later gaining the rank in full in September of the same year. In July 1915, he was appointed a temporary lieutenant colonel while acting as assistant quartermaster general; he was made a brevet lieutenant colonel in June 1916, and was made a brevet colonel in January 1917. In May 1917, he was appointed to the War Office as the Director of Mobilization, with the temporary rank of brigadier-general. Hitchcock was appointed a Companion to the Order of the Bath in the 1918 New Year Honours, and remained at the War Office for the remainder of the war.

Following the war, Hitchcock was tasked with demobilising the British Army. For his service during the war, he was decorated by the Kingdom of Italy with the Order of Saints Maurice and Lazarus in April 1919, and by France with the Croix de guerre in April 1920. He was promoted to the full rank of major-general in June 1919, and left the War Office in November 1921 to take up the appointment of major-general in charge of administration at Aldershot Command.

In July 1926, he was appointed commanding officer of the 55th (West Lancashire) Division, later relinquishing command to Major-General Harold Higginson in September 1928, following Hitchcock's appointment to the British Indian Army. In India, he was appointed General Officer Commanding Deccan District in October 1928, an appointment he held until his retirement in December 1930; Upon his retirement, he was promoted to lieutenant general.

His membership of the Order of the Bath was promotion from Companion to Knight Commander in the 1932 Birthday Honours. Hitchcock died in November 1938, at his home in Mount Street, Mayfair. He had been married Anne Austin Robertson-Walker at St Margaret's, Westminster in 22 October 1902; her father was the cricketer James Robertson.

Military offices
Preceded by Hugo de Pree	GOC 55th (West Lancashire) Division; 1926–1928	Succeeded by Harold Higginson
