= Harold Higginson =

British Army general (1873–1954)

Major-General Harold Higginson CB DSO*
- Born: 10 November 1873; British India
- Died: 30 October 1954 (aged 80)
- Military career
- Allegiance: United Kingdom
- Branch: British Army
- Rank: Major-General
- Service number: 24748
- Unit: Royal Dublin Fusiliers
- Commands: 2nd Battalion, Royal Dublin Fusiliers; 53rd Infantry Brigade; 12th (Eastern) Division; 17th Infantry Brigade; 2nd Infantry Brigade; British Troops in Ceylon; 55th (West Lancashire) Infantry Division
- Conflicts: Second Boer War; First World War
- Awards: Companion of the Order of the Bath; Distinguished Service Order & Bar

Major-General Harold Whitla Higginson, CB, DSO & Bar (10 November 1873 – 30 October 1954) was a British Army officer.

== Military career ==
Born in British India in 1873, the son of Colonel Theophilus Higginson, and educated at St Lawrence College, Ramsgate and the Royal Military College, Sandhurst, Higginson was commissioned as a second lieutenant in the Royal Dublin Fusiliers in October 1894. He was promoted to lieutenant in October 1896.

He saw action in the Second Boer War and was promoted to captain in December 1899. In February 1903, he was reported to be joining his regiment in Aden.

After serving as adjutant of the 4th (Militia) Battalion of his regiment, from February 1904 until March 1907, he was promoted to major in January 1913. On 1 May 1914 he was made a brigade major of a Territorial Force (TF) brigade.

He became commanding officer (CO) of the 2nd Battalion, Royal Dublin Fusiliers on the Western Front during the First World War, for which he was later appointed a Companion of the Distinguished Service Order (DSO) on 14 January 1916. Promoted to the temporary rank of brigadier general in May 1916, he succeeded Major General Henry Macandrew as commander of the 53rd Infantry Brigade, part of Major General Ivor Maxse's 18th (Eastern) Division, and saw action with his brigade during the Battle of the Somme later that year and the Battle of Passchendaele in the autumn of 1917. He was made a brevet colonel in January 1918 and became general officer commanding (GOC) of the 12th (Eastern) Division in April and, after commanding his division at the Battle of Amiens in August, was awarded a bar to his DSO on 18 September 1918. The bar's citation reads as follows:

For conspicuous gallantry and devotion to duty while commanding his brigade. In fourteen days' fighting the losses of the brigade exceeded 70 per cent, but owing to his able leadership and the fine example set by him their fighting spirit was in no way impaired. The courageous stands made by them were of great assistance to other brigades.

He continued to command his division during the Hundred Days Offensive in autumn 1918 and was appointed a Companion of the Order of the Bath in the 1919 New Year Honours. He was promoted to substantive lieutenant colonel in January 1919, and reverted from temporary major general to temporary brigadier general in March.

After the war, he became commander of the 17th Infantry Brigade at Cork in Ireland in November 1919: this was a troubled time in the city leading up to the Burning of Cork by the Black and Tans in December 1920.

His last appointments were as commander of the 2nd Infantry Brigade at Aldershot in February 1922, and after being placed on half-pay in November 1923, was Officer Commanding the British Troops in Ceylon in 1924. Promoted to substantive major general in June 1927, he relinquished this assignment in September and was then again placed on half-pay. He was then made GOC 55th (West Lancashire) Infantry Division, a Territorial Army formation, in September 1928, an appointment he relinquished in September 1932, the same month he retired from the army.

Military offices
| Preceded by Basil Hitchcock | GOC 55th (West Lancashire) Infantry Division; 1928–1932 | Succeeded by George Weir |
