= Hugo de Pree =

British Army officer (1870–1943)

Major-General Hugo de Pree CB CMG DSO
- Born: 25 December 1870; Mussoorie, Bengal, India
- Died: 30 March 1943 (aged 72)
- Military career
- Allegiance: United Kingdom
- Branch: British Army
- Service years: 1890–1931
- Rank: Major General
- Unit: Royal Artillery
- Commands: Royal Military Academy, Woolwich; 55th (West Lancashire) Division; 13th Indian Infantry Brigade
- Conflicts: North West Frontier; Second Boer War; First World War
- Awards: Companion of the Order of the Bath; Companion of the Order of St Michael and St George; Distinguished Service Order; Mentioned in Despatches

Major-General Hugo Douglas de Pree, CB, CMG, DSO (25 December 1870 – 30 March 1943) was a British Army officer who served as Commandant of the Royal Military Academy, Woolwich.

== Military career ==
Educated at Eton College and the Royal Military Academy, Woolwich, de Pree was commissioned as a second lieutenant in the Royal Artillery on 25 July 1890. He was promoted to lieutenant on 25 July 1893, and served on the North West Frontier of India in 1897. Promotion to captain followed on 3 February 1900, when he was divisional adjutant at Royal Artillery Barracks at Woolwich. After the outbreak of the Second Boer War in South Africa, he volunteered for service with the Imperial Yeomanry. He served originally with the 17th Battalion, but was on 3 May 1902 appointed second-in-command of the 7th Battalion, with the temporary rank of major. He relinquished his appointment with the Imperial Yeomanry on 5 September 1902, and returned to the Royal Horse Artillery to be stationed at Secunderabad.

De Pree later served in the First World War, being made a General Staff Officer (Grade 1) in January 1915.

He was appointed commander of the 13th Indian Infantry Brigade in 1920, promoted on 1 January 1924 to major general, and made general officer commanding (GOC) of the 55th (West Lancashire) Division, Territorial Army (TA), in April 1925, in succession to Major General Sir Cecil Nicholson. He was commandant of the Royal Military Academy, Woolwich, in 1926, before retiring in 1931.

He lived at Beckley in East Sussex where there is a memorial to de Pree at All Saints' Church.

== Family ==
Pree married firstly Diones Thornhill; they had three sons and one daughter. He later married Mary Fisher.

== Bibliography ==
- Sheffield, Gary (2019). In Haig's Shadow: The Letters of Brigadier-General Hugo De Pree and Field-Marshal Sir Douglas Haig. Greenhill Books. ISBN 978-1784383534.

Military offices
Preceded by Sir Lothian Nicholson	GOC 55th (West Lancashire) Division; 1925–1926	Succeeded by Basil Hitchcock
Preceded by Ronald Charles	Commandant of the Royal Military Academy Woolwich; 1926–1930	Succeeded by Cyril Wagstaff
