= 1st Sussex Artillery Volunteers =

1st Sussex Artillery Volunteers 1st Home Counties Brigade, RFA 57th (Home Counties) Field Regiment, RA 113th (Home Counties) Field Regiment, RA 257 (County of Sussex) Field Regiment, RA 313 (Sussex) Heavy AA Regiment, RA
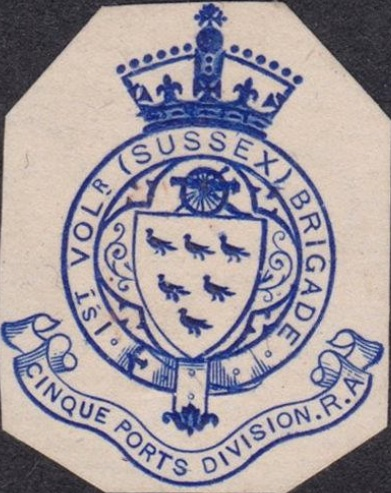
- Letterhead of the 1st Sussex Artillery Volunteers, c1900
- Active: 19 November 1859 – 4 October 1961
- Country: United Kingdom
- Branch: Volunteer Force/Territorial Army
- Type: Artillery Corps
- Role: Coastal Artillery; Field Artillery; Anti-Aircraft Artillery
- Size: Artillery Brigade/Regiment
- Garrison/HQ: Brighton
- Engagements: Mesopotamian Campaign; Battle of France; Alamein; Tunisian Campaign; Sicily; Italy

Commanders
- Notable commanders: Sir Charles Gervaise Boxall, KCB, VD

The 1st Sussex Artillery Volunteers was a part-time unit of the British Army's Royal Artillery from 1859 to 1961. Raised as coastal defence artillery, the unit later served as field artillery in Mesopotamia during World War I, and in North Africa, Sicily, Italy and North West Europe during World War II. It carried out a number of roles in the postwar Territorial Army.

== Volunteer Force ==
=== Origin ===
The enthusiasm for the Volunteer Movement following an invasion scare in 1859 saw the creation of many units composed of part-time soldiers eager to supplement the Regular British Army in time of need. The 1st Sussex Artillery Volunteer Corps (AVC) was formed at Brighton on 19 November 1859. This soon reached a strength of eight batteries. Other AVCs were formed along the Sussex Coast and, on 8 June 1860, the 1st Administrative Brigade, Sussex Artillery Volunteers was formed at Brighton with the following composition:

- 1st Sussex AVC at Brighton
- 2nd Sussex AVC, formed at Fairlight, East Sussex on 13 March 1860
- 3rd Sussex AVC formed at Hailsham on 15 May 1860; HQ moved to Eastbourne in 1878
- 4th Sussex AVC, formed at Shoreham-by-Sea on 28 December 1860; absorbed into 1st Sussex AVC September 1864, regained independence 14 July 1875.

G.C. Dalbaic, formerly of the 4th Light Dragoons, was appointed lieutenant-colonel of the 1st Admin Brigade in 1864, with Lt-Col Thomas G. Johnston of the 1st Sussex AVC as his major. Major Charles S. Hannington of the 1st Sussex AVC, owner of Hanningtons department store in Brighton, became lt-col of both the AVC and the Admin Brigade in 1868, and honorary colonel in 1873. In 1865, the 1st Sussex became the first unit to win the Queen's Prize at the annual National Artillery Association competition held at Shoeburyness. They subsequently won it again in 1867.

In April 1880, the 1st Admin Brigade was consolidated as the 1st Sussex Artillery Volunteers with 12 batteries organised as follows:

- Nos 1 to 8 at Brighton
- No 9 at Fairlight
- Nos 10 and 11 at Eastbourne
- No 12 at Shoreham

The 1st Sussex was assigned to the Cinque Ports Division of the Royal Artillery (RA) in 1882, transferring to the Eastern Division after the Cinque Ports Division was disbanded in 1889.

In 1886, the unit was divided into the 1st and 2nd Sussex Artillery Volunteers based at Brighton and Eastbourne respectively.

=== Position artillery ===
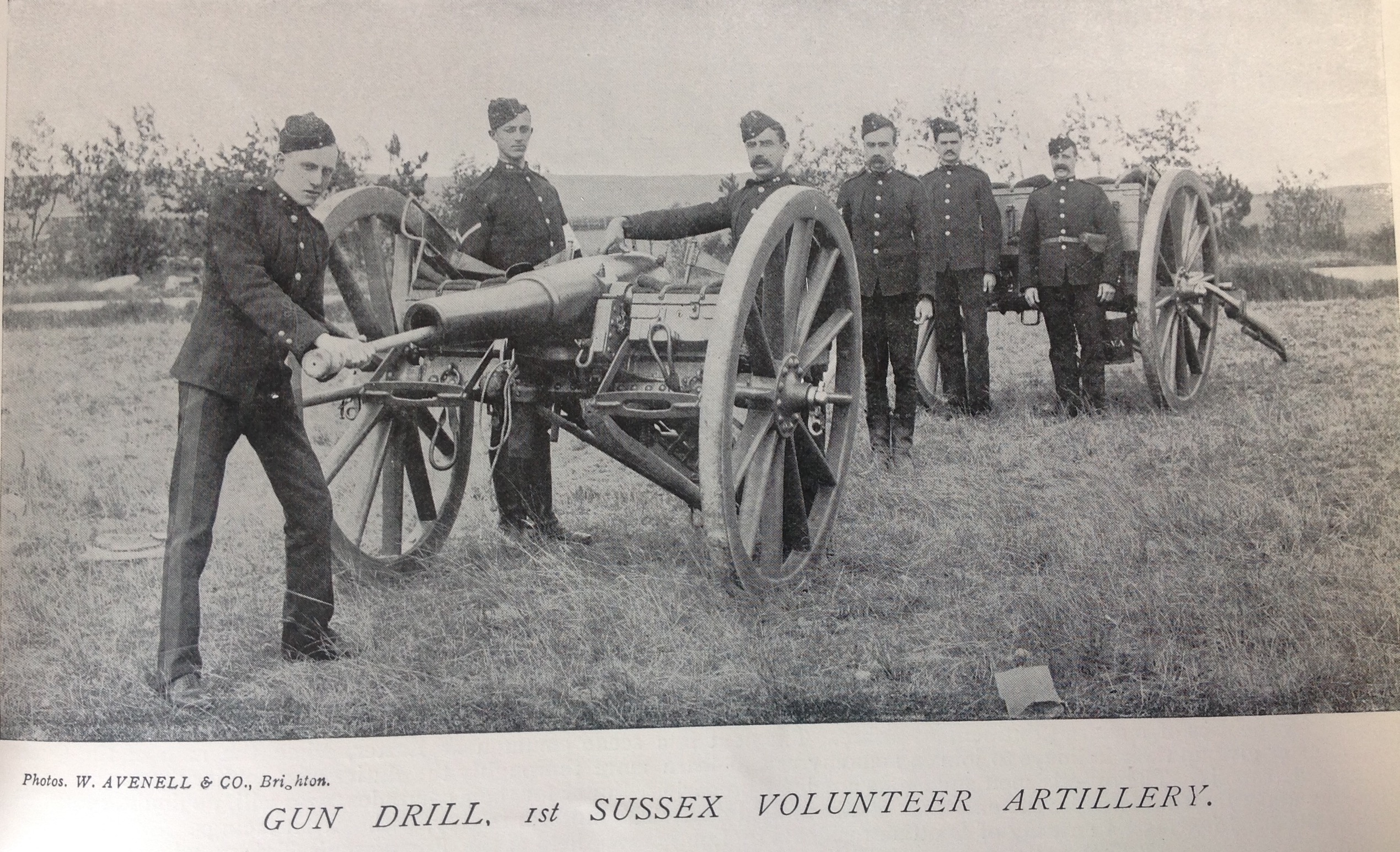
16 Pounder Rifled Muzzle Loading gun of one of 1st Sussex Artillery Volunteers position batteries

As well as manning fixed coast defence artillery, from the early days of the Artillery Volunteers, Captain George Darby of the 3rd Sussex AVC, a former MP for Sussex, had promoted the idea of the Volunteers manning semi-mobile 'position batteries' of smooth-bore field guns pulled by agricultural horses. This concept was put into practice by a number of AVCs, but the War Office refused to pay for the upkeep of field guns and they had died out among the AVCs in the 1870s. In 1888, the concept was revived and some Volunteer batteries were reorganised as position artillery to work alongside the Volunteer infantry brigades. In 1892, the 1st Sussex was reorganised as follows:

No 1 Position Battery at Brighton Nos 2–6 Garrison Companies at Brighton No 7 Garrison Company at Lewes No 8 Garrison Company at High Street, Shoreham

In 1899, the Artillery volunteers were transferred to the Royal Garrison Artillery (RGA), the Sussex units becoming the 1st Sussex RGA (V) at Brighton and 2nd Sussex RGA (V) at Eastbourne respectively, with the 2nd Sussex designated as position or 'heavy' artillery.

=== Railway gun ===
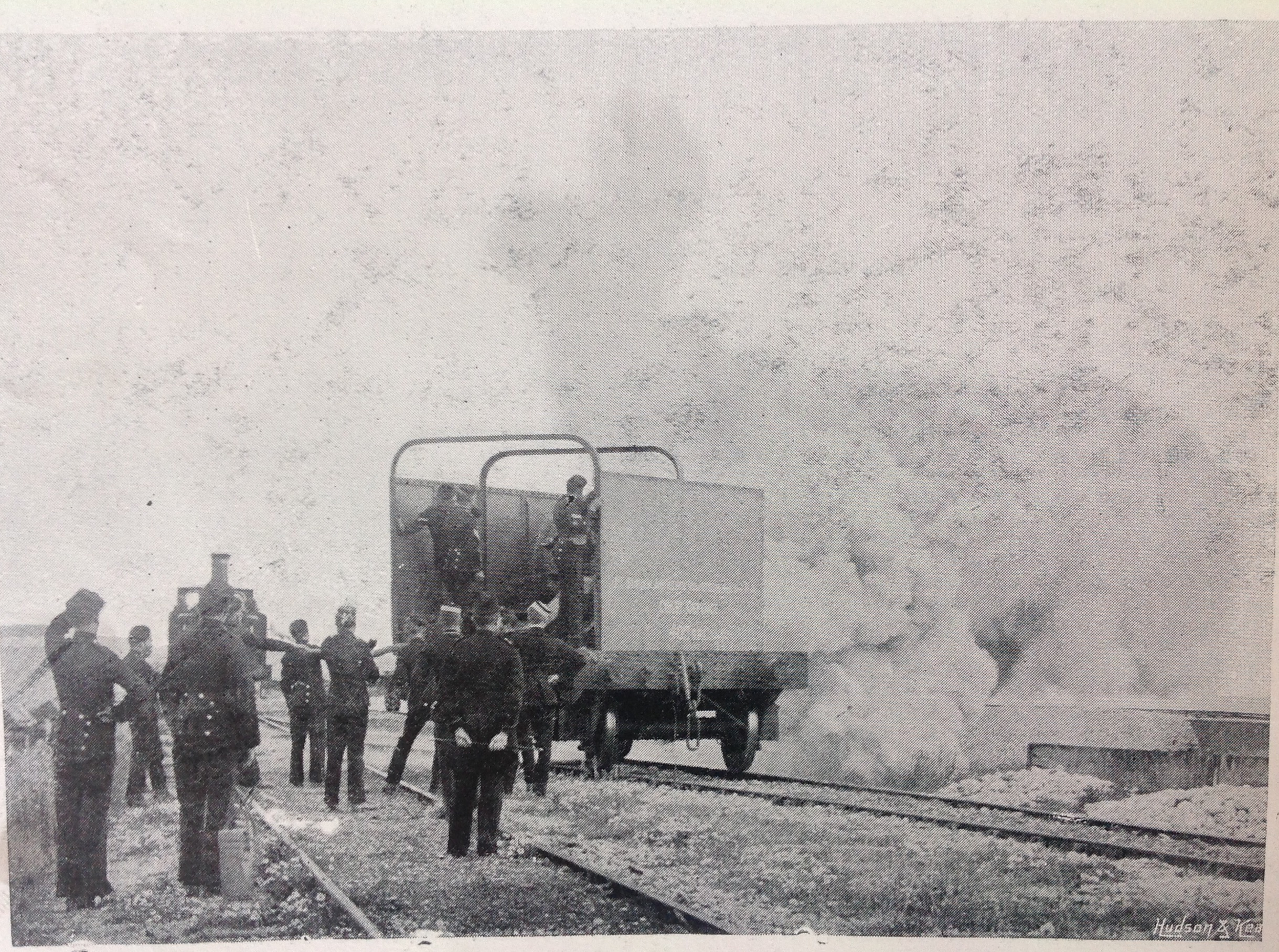
40 Pounder gun on armoured train, 1st Sussex Artillery Volunteers, 1896

Charles Gervaise Boxall (1852–1914), a Brighton-born London solicitor, was commissioned as a 2nd Lieutenant in the 1st Sussex in 1873 and rose to become its commanding officer (CO) in 1893. In 1884 he published The Armoured Train for Coast Defence in Great Britain, outlining a new way to employ heavy artillery. No 6 Garrison Company of the 1st Sussex AVC was formed entirely from railway workers, and in 1894 they manned an Armoured train constructed in the workshops of the London, Brighton and South Coast Railway (of which the unit's Honorary Colonel, Sir Julian Goldsmid, was a director).

Boxall was an enthusiastic member of the Volunteer Movement, and was awarded the Volunteer Decoration (VD) in 1894 and made a Companion of the Bath (CB) in 1897. He succeeded Goldsmid as Honorary Colonel in 1896. When the Second Boer War broke out, he suggested the creation of a combat unit drawn from the London volunteer units. This became the City of London Imperial Volunteers (CIV) to which he acted as secretary and depot commandant. Boxall was knighted (KCB) for his services during the war, and in 1906–7 he served on the committee that recommended the creation of the Territorial Force.

== Territorial Force ==
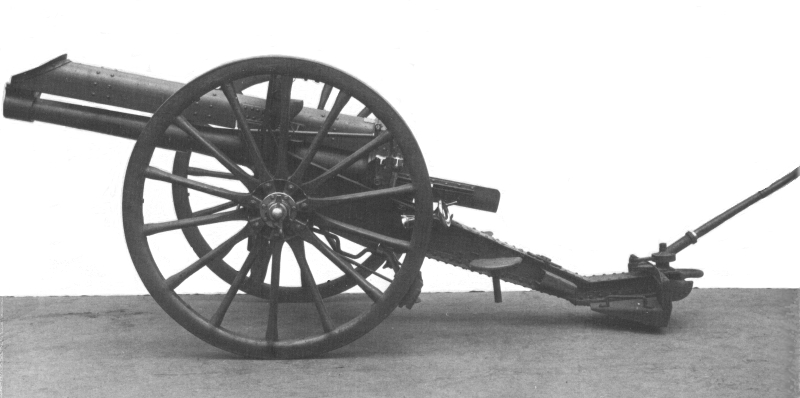
15-pounder gun.

When the Volunteers were subsumed into the new Territorial Force (TF) under the Haldane Reforms of 1908, the bulk of the 1st and 2nd Sussex RGA (V) transferred to the Royal Field Artillery (RFA), forming the I Home Counties Brigade and two batteries of the II Home Counties Brigade respectively. Two companies of the 1st Sussex remained with the RGA to form part of the Kent and Sussex RGA.

The I (or 1st) Home Counties Brigade had the following organisation:

I Home Counties Brigade, RFA

- HQ at Drill Hall, Church Street, Brighton
- 1st Sussex Battery at Brighton
- 2nd Sussex Battery at Brighton
- 3rd Sussex Battery at Drill Hall, Marmion Road, Hove; C Subsection at Shoreham
- 1st Home Counties Ammunition Column at Worthing

The three batteries were each equipped with four 15-pounder guns. The unit was assigned to the Home Counties Division of the TF.

Affiliated to the unit were the 1st Cadet Battalion, 1st Home Counties Bde, RFA, (Imperial Service Cadet Corps) at Brighton, the Steyne School Cadet Corps, and the Brighton Brigade, Sussex Cadets.

== World War I ==
=== Mobilisation ===
On the outbreak of war, the TF was mobilised for home defence and units were then invited to volunteer for overseas service. On 15 August 1914 the War Office issued instructions to separate those men who had signed up for Home Service only, and on 31 August, the formation of a reserve or 2nd Line unit was authorised for each 1st Line unit where 60 per cent or more of the men had volunteered for Overseas Service. Duplicate battalions, brigades and divisions were thereby created, mirroring those TF formations being sent overseas. The titles of these 2nd Line units would be the same as the original, but distinguished by a '2/' prefix. In this way the 1/I and 2/I Home Counties Brigades were formed.

On the outbreak of war in August 1914, the unit was under the command of Lt-Col Sir Berry Cusack-Smith, 5th Bt, KCMG, former Consul-General to Valparaíso, and the officer commanding 1st Sussex Bty was Major A.P. Boxall (nephew of Sir Charles Boxall).

=== 1/I Home Counties Brigade ===
The bulk of the Home Counties Division, including the 1/I Home Counties Brigade without its Brigade Ammunition Column, embarked at Southampton and sailed on 30 October 1914 for India to relieve Regular Army units to fight on the Western Front. The Territorials disembarked at Bombay 1–3 December, and were allotted to various peacetime stations across India. Although the Home Counties Division remained in the order of battle and received a number (as the 44th (Home Counties) Division) in May 1915, it never served as a complete formation during the First World War. On arrival in India 1/I Home Counties Bde was assigned to the 5th (Mhow) Division.

The Territorials completed their training in India to prepare them for possible active service, and they supplied drafts to units serving in the Mesopotamian campaign. When there was an urgent request for reinforcements to lift the Turkish Army's Siege of Kut, the 1/I Home Counties Bde was part of the 'Emergency Force' sent from India. Still armed with obsolescent 15-pounders it landed at Basra between 7 and 12 December 1915 and in January 1916 it joined Tigris Corps (soon afterward retitled III Indian Corps).

==== Mesopotamia 1916 ====
1/1st and 1/2nd Sussex Batteries moved up with the Emergency Force to reinforce Nasiriyah on the Euphrates, while 1/3rd Sussex Bty and Bde HQ followed later. During January, 12th Indian Division HQ at Nasiriyah pushed a force including 1/2nd Sussex Bty a few miles up the river to Butaniyah against some opposition, but there it halted. Meanwhile, 1/1st Sussex Bty with 7th (Meerut) Division took part in the Battle of Sheikh Sa'ad, attempting to dislodge the main Turkish force blocking the way to Kut. The force advanced on both banks of the Euphrates, the 1/1st Sussex Bty accompanying the column on the left bank. The attack went in on 6 January, but morning mist followed by Mirage made accurate artillery fire difficult in the flat featureless terrain. Even with the support of 1/1st Sussex Bty, the 37th Dogras had only got to about 800 yards from the Turkish trenches by 15.30 and were digging in under heavy fire. The attack was called off to allow the troops to regroup. In a renewed attack the following day, the battery suffered the same problems, and the column had no better success. The right bank column, however, succeeded in taking Sheikh Sa'ad, despite heavy casualties. The force was too exhausted to take immediate advantage of the position.

An attempt to turn the enemy line on 13 January led to the Battle of the Wadi. 1/1st Sussex Bty again supported 7th (Meerut) Division. The infantry forded the River Wadi with ease, but it constituted a serious obstacle to artillery, so the guns were not across until the afternoon. Once they had come into action at 13.30, firing into the rear of the Turkish guns and trenches at a range of 3500 yards, 7th (Meerut) Division began its attack. Most of the Turkish artillery fire was directed at the British guns rather than the infantry, but the attack still made little progress. The divisional artillery had to be concentrated before the next attack, and bad weather on 14 January delayed this. Meanwhile, the Turks had slipped away to their next position of strength at Hanna, and pursuit was hampered by the weather. On 7 February the detachment at Butaniyah was withdrawn, 1/2nd Sussex Bty covering the retirement.

By the beginning of March, the relief force had been reinforced, including 1/3rd Sussex Bty, and a new advance against the Hanna position was begun. 1/1st and 1/3rd Sussex Btys remained with the weak force left to contain the enemy and guard the British camp and bridges, so they played little part in the Battle of Dujaila, which was another failure.

For the third relief attempt, on 5 April, 1/1st and 1/3rd Sussex Btys were with the concentrated corps artillery, which was organised into separate counter-battery, enfilading, breaching and barrage groups. However, the Turks had abandoned their trenches and the attack hit 'thin air'. The force pushed on and made a rushed attack on poorly-reconnoitred positions at dawn the following day. The artillery fire was misdirected in the poor light, and the attack was bloodily repulsed at Sannaiyat. A series of deliberate attacks on the Sannaiyat position failed to break through, though they got to Bait Isa. On 18 April, the Turks put in a strong counter-offensive, against which the artillery caused terrible casualties, especially when the Turkish infantry retreated from the unbroken British line. A renewed British attack on 22 April failed to break through, despite the concentration of artillery, and shortly afterwards the garrison of Kut surrendered.

==== India ====
1/I Home Counties Bde was withdrawn to India in July 1916. On return to India the 1/1st and 1/2nd Sussex Btys went to Lahore where they were attached to 1/I Wessex Bde RFA in 3rd Lahore Divisional Area, while 1/3rd Sussex Bty went to Sialkot under II Mountain Brigade RGA in 2nd (Rawalpindi) Division.

In December 1916, the 1/1st and 1/3rd Sussex Btys, now at Multan and Delhi respectively, joined with the 1/4th and 1/5th Sussex Btys (from 1/II Home Counties Brigade) to form the I Combined Home Counties Brigade in 3rd Lahore Divisional Area.

During 1916, the brigade had been formally renumbered as CCXX Brigade (220th Bde) and the batteries designated A, B and C. In 1917 the batteries were finally re-equipped with 18-pounders and redesignated again as 1064, 1065 and 1066 Btys; 1065 Bty was then broken up between the other two to bring them up to six guns each. From April to September 1917, Brigade HQ and 1066 Bty were at Meerut and 1064 Bty still at Multan, all under 7th Meerut Divisional Area.

The brigade (with a reformed Brigade Ammunition Column) returned to Basra between 18 and 23 October 1917.

==== Mesopotamia 1918 ====
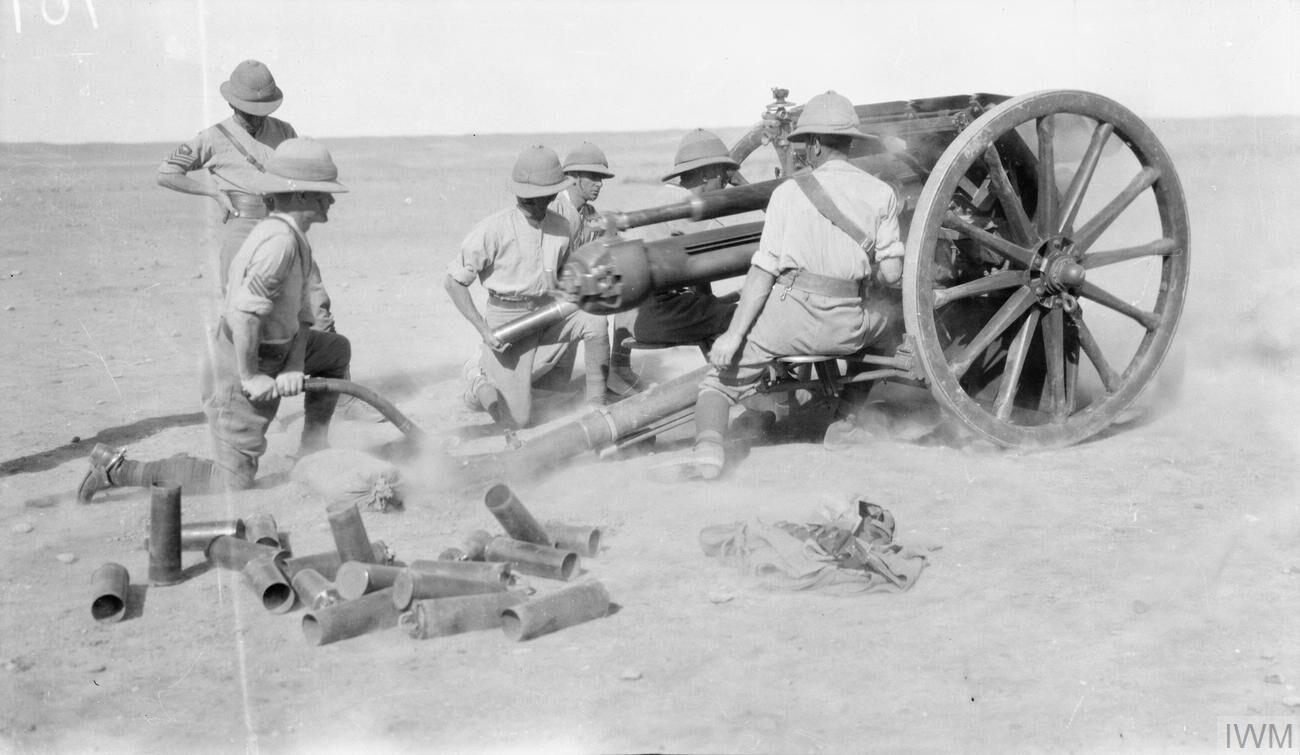
18-pounder in action in Mesopotamia.

CCXX Brigade made its way from Basra to Baghdad where it joined the newly formed 17th Indian Division on 11 November. In May 1918, it was joined by 403rd (Howitzer) Bty (with six 4.5-inch howitzers) from England and an Anglo-Indian battery formed in India with four 18-pounders. Other RFA brigades from 44th and 67th (HC) Divisions also served in 17th and 18th Indian Divisions, which constituted the bulk of I Indian Corps under Lt-Gen Sir Alexander Cobbe, VC, which concentrated at Tikrit on the Tigris in October 1918.

By now, the Turks were in retreat in Palestine and on the Euphrates Front in Mesopotamia, and it was time for the forces on the Tigris Front to exert pressure by advancing on Mosul. 17th Indian Division moved up the west bank and 18th Division up the east bank. The problem was the strong Turkish position on the Little Zab river and the Fat-Ha gorge, 35 miles further on. Rather than make a direct assault with the untried 17th and 18th Indian Divisions, Cobbe chose to outflank the gorge with a mobile column.

On 23 October, the 17th and 18th Divisions were within a mile of the Fat-Ha trenches; 220th Bde was on the west bank with 17th Division. The division advanced as the moon rose at 21.30, with the divisional artillery following close behind the leading infantry brigades to get as close as possible to the Turkish defences. But it found the Turkish positions empty; the flanking column had done its job. By 11.15 the following morning, the division was astride Jabal Makhul and shortly afterwards patrols crossed the Little Zab.

On 26 October, the division closed up to Mushak. This time the Turks stood and fought, catching 403rd (H) Bty in the open and putting it temporarily out of action with 25 casualties. Lieutenant-Colonel R.K. Lynch-Staunton, CO of 220th Bde, was mortally wounded in this action.

17th Division was ordered to assault along the crest of Jabal Makhul at dawn on 27 October and once again found the enemy trenches empty. It set off in pursuit, the advance guard comprising 220th Bde (403rd (H) Bty and one section each from 1064th and 1066th Btys, with 404th (H) and 25 Mountain Btys attached) with the 32nd Lancers and some infantry. The going was, however, appalling and progress was slow.

The main Turkish position was discovered at Sharqat. At dawn on 28 October, the Turks counter-attacked and were engaged by guns from the other bank of the river. This attack having been stopped, 17th Division then deployed to attack, with 1066th and 404th (H) Btys coming into action some 3000 yards from Sharquat. By last light, the Turks were trapped against the river by 17th Division and the cavalry with 220th Bde (403rd (H) Bty less a section, 404th (H) Bty and a section each from 1064th and 1066th Btys) in action. To make sure that the Turks surrendered, 17th Division was ordered to attack with the rising moon at 01.45 on 29 October. The advance was very slow over broken ground, but at 11.30 all the guns of both divisions were turned on the Turks. A final attack went in at 15.30 on 29 October, and at first light the following morning the Turks in Sharquat surrendered. At noon on 31 October, the Armistice of Mudros ended hostilities with Turkey.

At the end of the war, the 17th Indian Division was selected to form part of the occupation force in Iraq and served during the Iraq Rebellion of 1920. It is not clear when the TF units were demobilised and sent home; the 44th (Home Counties) Division began to reform in 1920.

=== 2/I Home Counties Brigade ===
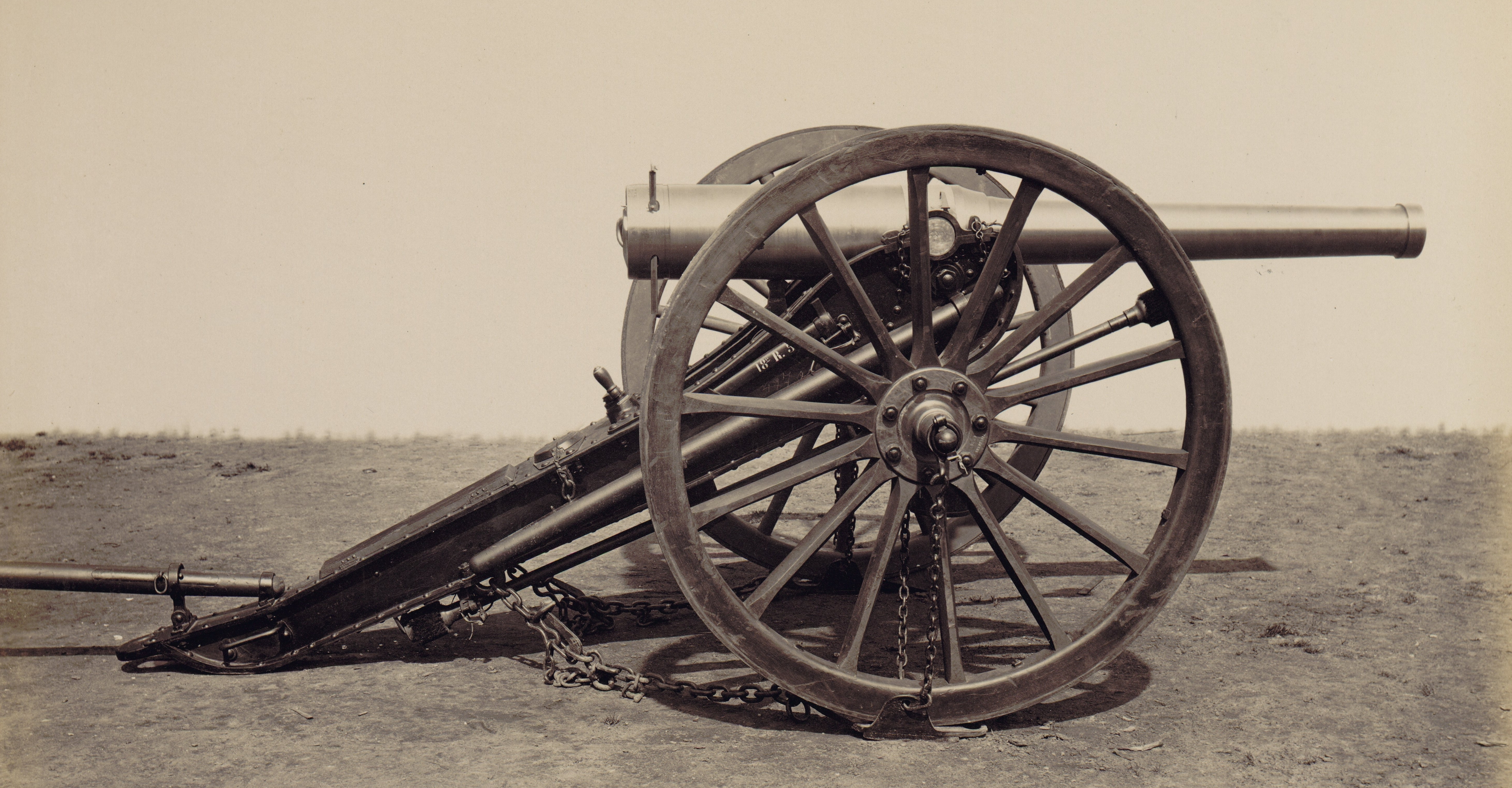
De Bange 90 mm French field gun issued to 2nd Line batteries.

Because the 1st Home Counties Division had gone to India, the 2nd Home Counties Division was among the earliest 2nd Line formations to be formed. By 27 November 1914, the division was settled in billets round Windsor, Berkshire, and was reported ready to receive its weapons. However, the only guns available for the RFA brigades were obsolete French 90 mm guns, and even then there were only four guns per brigade. It was not until January 1916 that the division's gunners received their modern 18-pounders, and even then some time elapsed before sights arrived.

Meanwhile, the division had been numbered as 67th (2nd Home Counties) Division and given a dual role of training drafts for units serving overseas and at the same time being part of the mobile force responsible for home defence. From November 1915 it formed part of Second Army, Central Force, quartered in Kent. Twice the division was warned to prepare for moves to Ireland, but these moves never happened and the division remained in England for the whole war.

In May 1916, the field brigades were numbered, with 2/II Home Counties becoming CCCXXXV Brigade (335th Bde) and the batteries were designated A, B and C. A howitzer battery (D (H)) equipped with 5-inch howitzers was added later in the year when CCCXXXVIII (2/IV Home Counties) Howitzer Bde was broken up. However, in 1917, the whole brigade was broken up to bring the batteries of the other RFA brigades of 67th Division up to a strength of six guns each before they went overseas to serve in Mesopotamia.

== Interwar ==
The 1st Home Counties Brigade re-formed in the renamed Territorial Army in 1920 and was designated the 57th (Home Counties) Brigade, RFA, the following year. In 1924, the RFA was subsumed into the Royal Artillery. During the interwar years, the unit had the following organisation:

57th (Home Counties) Field Brigade, RA

- HQ at Drill Hall, Church Street, Brighton
- 225th (Sussex) Bty at Brighton
- 226th (Sussex) Bty at Brighton
- 227th (Sussex) Bty at Marmion Road, Hove
- 228th (Sussex) Bty (Howitzer) at Ivy Arch Lane, Worthing

The brigade was once again assigned as divisional artillery to 44th (Home Counties) Division, and was initially under the command of Lt-Col A.P. Boxall until 1924. In 1924 the RFA was subsumed into the Royal Artillery (RA), and the word 'Field' was inserted into the titles of its brigades and batteries. The establishment of a TA divisional artillery brigade was four 6-gun batteries, three equipped with 18-pounders and one with 4.5-inch howitzers, all of World War I patterns. However, the batteries only held four guns in peacetime. The guns and their first-line ammunition wagons were still horsedrawn and the battery staffs were mounted. Partial mechanisation was carried out from 1927, but the guns retained iron-tyred wheels until pneumatic tyres began to be introduced just before World War II.

In August 1938, the brigade's batteries replaced the 'Sussex' subtitle with the name of their home town. In 1938, the RA modernised its nomenclature and a lieutenant-colonel's command was designated a 'regiment' rather than a 'brigade'; this applied to TA field brigades from 1 November 1938. The TA was doubled in size after the Munich Crisis, and most regiments split to form duplicates. Part of the reorganisation was that field regiments changed from four six-gun batteries to an establishment of two batteries, each of three four-gun troops. For the Home Counties brigade, this resulted in the following organisation from 1 May 1939:

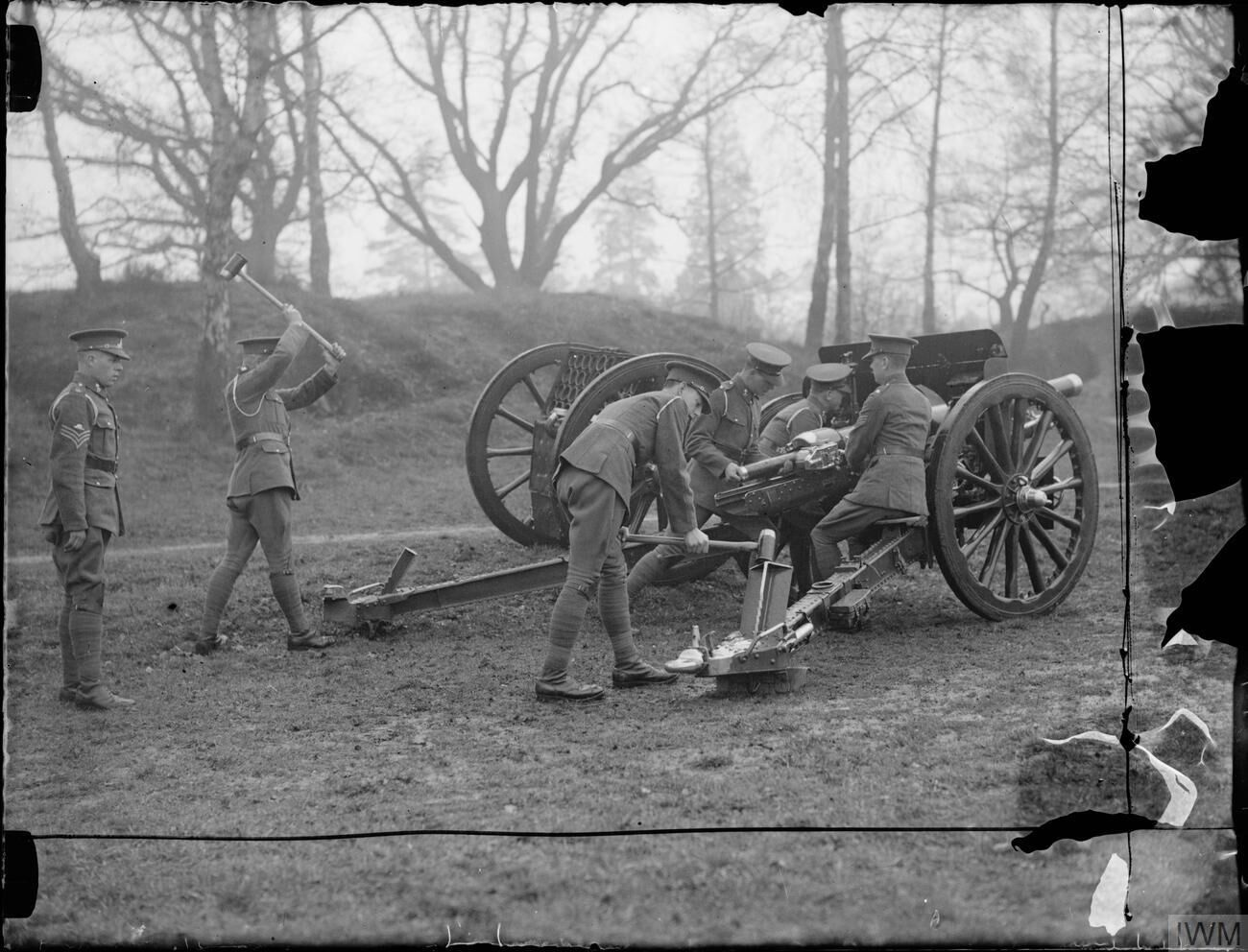
Emplacing an 18-pounder with wooden wheels at the start of World War II

57th (Home Counties) Field Regiment

- Regimental Headquarters (RHQ) at Brighton
- 225 (Brighton) Field Bty
- 226 (Brighton) Field Bty

113th Field Regiment

- RHQ at Shoreham
- 227 (Hove) Field Bty
- 228 (Worthing) Field Bty

== World War II ==
=== 57th (Home Counties) Field Regiment ===
==== Battle of France ====
Orders to mobilise were received on 1 September ahead of the outbreak of war on 3 September 1939. Mobilisation went smoothly and on 14 September 57th Fd Rgt moved to Forest Row for intensive training. On 24 October, the division concentrated in Somerset and the regiment moved to Stoke under Ham. However, the shortage of tools and equipment hampered training. The regiment carried out live firing exercises at Larkhill with 18-pounders and 18/25-pounders. 44th (HC) Division began moving to France to join the British Expeditionary Force (BEF) on 1 April 1940, and 57th Fd Rgt moved up to the St Pol area.

When the German offensive in the west opened on 10 May, the BEF advanced into Belgium in accordance with 'Plan D', with 44th (HC) Division moving up to the Escaut, where it was in reserve. However, the German Army broke through the Ardennes to the east, forcing the BEF to withdraw again, and by 19 May the whole force was back across the Escaut, with 57th Fd Rgt deployed at Jammel Hoek covering the canal line.

This was the most threatened part of the British line, and there was severe fighting after the enemy established bridgeheads across the Escaut at dawn on 20 May. However, it was the deep German penetration further east that forced the BEF to withdraw to the next canal line on the Belgian frontier by 23 May. 44th (HC) Division withdrew into GHQ Reserve, and then took up positions immediately south of Hazebrouck.

On the morning of 27 May, this line came under attack. By now the decision had been made to withdraw the BEF to Dunkirk for evacuation (Operation Dynamo). 44th Divisional artillery covered the division's retreat until close to Dunkirk, where all routes were completely blocked by abandoned French vehicles. The gunners destroyed their guns and vehicles before marching to the evacuation beaches on foot. 44th (HC) Division got away in pretty good order aboard boats on 30–31 May, but 57th Fd Rgt lost a number of officers and men in the process.

==== Home Defence ====
After evacuation, the artillery of 44th (HC) Division re-formed in the Oxford area before moving to Northern England to be re-equipped. 57th Field Rgt moved to Pontefract in July and some 25-pounder guns began to arrive later in the month. 44th (HC) Division then moved to Sussex to man a key part of the anti-invasion defences in South East England under I Corps.

One of the lessons learned from the Battle of France was that the two-battery organisation did not work: field regiments were intended to support an infantry brigade of three battalions. As a result, they were reorganised into three 8-gun batteries, but it was not until late 1940 that the RA had enough trained battery staffs to carry out the reorganisation. 57th Field Rgt accordingly formed 440 Fd Bty on 28 February 1941 while the regiment was stationed at Sittingbourne.

44th (HC) Division remained in Sussex and Kent until the end of May 1942, when it embarked for the Middle East. It landed in Egypt on 24 July, with 57th Fd Rgt equipped with 24 x 25-pounder guns.

==== North Africa ====
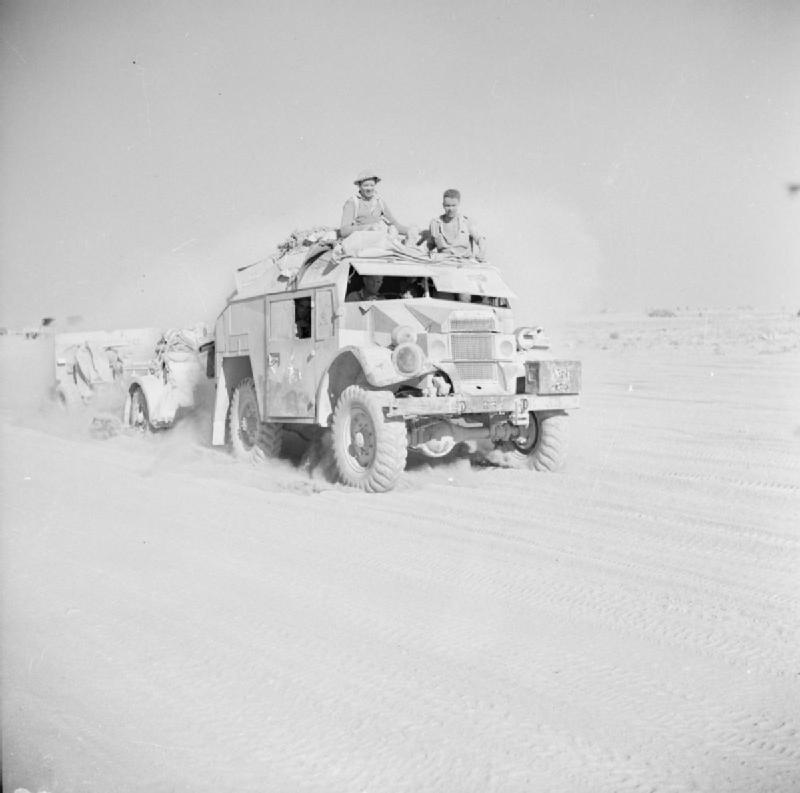
25-pounder and Quad tractor moving up to the front in the Western Desert, 29 October 1942.

At the time of its arrival, the British forces in Egypt were facing a crisis against Rommel's Panzerarmee Afrika, and the division was lucky not to be thrown straight into action without any desert experience. Instead it got a bare month to train and was positioned on the key south-facing Alam el Halfa ridge when Rommel resumed his offensive with a right hook round the British Eighth Army's defences at El Alamein. During the resulting Battle of Alam el Halfa on 31 August the German Afrika Korps was drawn into attacking dug-in British tanks, supported by 44th Divisional artillery.

During the Second Battle of El Alamein, 44th (HC) Division supported 7th Armoured Division, which itself was tasked with carrying out a subsidiary attack on the first day (23 October). Much of this support was with artillery fire. 57th Field Rgt contributed to the famous '1000 gun' barrage that opened the battle. In the later stages of the battle elements of the division were switched north to assist the main breakthrough.

44th (HC) Division was broken up after Alamein and 57th Fd Rgt became an Army Field Regiment under Eighth Army. In January 1943, it joined 5th Army Group Royal Artillery (5 AGRA) forming at Medenine in Tunisia. 5 AGRA usually supported XXX Corps. The regiment participated in the battles of Medenine, Mareth, Wadi Akarit, and the capture of Tunis.

440 Bty joined 74th (Northumbrian) Fd Rgt on 10 May 1943, and was replaced on 10 June by 160 Independent Fd Bty originally from 174th Fd Rgt.

==== Italy ====
57th Field Rgt took part in the Allied invasion of Sicily (Operation Husky) as part of 5 AGRA supporting XXX Corps' campaign in the east of the island. On 2 August the regiment supported the successful attack by 38th (Irish) Brigade on Centuripe. 5 AGRA and the rest of XXX Corps artillery then provided crushing support for XIII Corps in its assault crossing of the Straits of Messina (Operation Baytown) on 3 September 1943. Against this force, the landings were not seriously disputed, and Eighth Army began advancing up the Calabria coast.

In November, XXX Corps including HQ 5 AGRA were withdrawn to the UK to prepare for the Allied invasion of Europe (Operation Overlord), and 57th Fd Rgt transferred to 6 AGRA, which remained under Eighth Army in Italy.

6 AGRA supported V Corps at the crossing on the Sangro in November 1943, when 57th Fd Rgt was detached to work directly under 78th Division. The field regiments fired over 600 rounds per gun in the three days of this engagement. 6 AGRA was involved in other operations by Eighth Army and US Fifth Army, including the Battle of Monte Cassino in April 1944, the fighting on the Gothic Line (August) and at Castel del Rio (December 1944), and the crossing of the River Po (April 1945) that effectively ended the Italian Campaign.

57th (Home Counties) Field Regiment was placed in suspended animation on 15 February 1946.

=== 113th (Home Counties) Field Regiment ===
==== Home Defence ====
113th Field Regiment mobilised in 12th (Eastern) Infantry Division, the 2nd Line duplicate of 44th (HC) Division, but when the division moved to France in April 1940, it was only intended for labour duties and the RA units remained behind in the UK. After the Dunkirk evacuation, the 12th Division was broken up, and on 6 July 113th Fd Rgt joined 1st London Division (shortly afterwards designated 56th (London) Division). Post-Dunkirk, this formation was part of XII Corps in the south-east corner of England, the most-threatened area in the country, moving to XI Corps in November. 113th Field Rgt formed its third battery, 478 Fd Bty, on 27 February 1941. On 17 February 1942, 113th Fd Rgt was authorised to use its parent unit's 'Home Counties' subtitle.

==== Iraq and North Africa ====
In August 1942, the division embarked for the Middle East, arriving in Iraq to reinforce Persia and Iraq Command (PAIC) in November. By the time it arrived, the threats to the Persian oilfields had diminished with the British victory at El Alamein and the lack of German progress at the Battle of Stalingrad. The troops in PAIC were therefore free to undergo intensive training, and 56th Division was selected for the planned Allied invasion of Sicily (Operation Husky).

This involved a move from Kirkuk via Palestine and Egypt to join X Corps of Eighth Army in Tunisia, covering approximately 3200 miles between 19 March and 19 April 1943. As soon as it arrived it was thrown into the last stages of the Tunisian Campaign, because Gen Montgomery did not want an untried division in Husky. Given the task of capturing Tarhuna during the night of 28/29 April, it succeeded but was driven off the position the following morning. Montgomery realised that the division needed time to learn battlecraft. It went into action again during the final advance on Tunis (Operation Vulcan), moving north to meet 6th Armoured Division of First Army coming south, whose leading troops were able to spot for X Corps' guns via 56th Division's wireless net.

==== Salerno to Anzio ====
Because of Montgomery's doubts, 56th Division was not in fact used in Operation Husky. Instead, it moved back to Tripoli in Libya for further training, and then put to sea on 1 September for the invasion of mainland Italy, landing at Salerno on 9 September (Operation Avalanche). H-Hour was at 03.30, the division's leading infantry landing craft touched down at 03.35 covered by naval gunfire, and 113th Fd Rgt's guns began landing at 05.35. The whole regiment was ashore and ready for action at 16.15.

Over the next few days, the division fought its way forward to extend the beachhead against strong German counter-attacks, and the divisional artillery was heavily engaged in defensive fire (DF) tasks. X Corps began its advance out of the beachhead on the night of 22/23 September with massive artillery support and reached Naples on 30 September.

By 11 October, the division was on the Volturno Line but failed to cross the river the following day and had to wait until 16 October before it could cross and begin the pursuit through rough country beyond. This brought the division to the Bernhardt Line, where 113th Fd Rgt lent support to the attack of 201st Guards Brigade up 'Bare Arse Ridge' on 6 November during the Battle of Monte Camino. Attacks at Monte Camino continued in early December, with large numbers of guns in support, until the division seized the heights on 6 December.

56th Division was next tasked with capturing a bridgehead across the Garigliano using strong artillery support (400 rounds per gun were supplied for the division's 25-pounders). The attack on the night of 17/18 January 1944 was successful and by morning the leading battalions were across and attacking with plenty of artillery support. The division began its breakout from the bridgehead on 23 January, but at the end of the month was ordered to pull out and go by sea to reinforce the Anzio beachhead. By 15 February, the whole division had arrived and taken over part of the line under US VI Corps, in time to beat off the German counter-attack (Operation Fischfang or 'Catching Fish').

Trench warfare in the Anzio bridgehead continued for months. On 28 February, the German I Parachute Corps began an offensive against 56th Division that produced no change in the line. When the attack was widened to the front of 3rd US Division the following day, accompanied by unusually heavy support from field artillery, the whole artillery in VI Corps brought down a pre-emptive counter-preparation programme. Although this was too late to catch the German troops as they formed up, the attack made no real impression on the Allied defences. 56th Division was by now so weak that it was relieved and on 28 March went by sea to Egypt for recuperation.

==== Italy again ====
56th Division returned to Italy on 17 July 1944 and was assigned to V Corps for the attack on the Gothic Line (Operation Olive). When the offensive opened on 25 August 1944, V Corps was still moving up, and 56th Division was its reserve, but its artillery was sent on ahead to strengthen the Corps artillery. Once the Corps had broken into the German positions, 56th Division was used to widen the breach on 1 September, and then on 3 September to lead the pursuit, taking Monte Maggiore before opposition increased at the Gemmano–Coriano high ground. There followed hard methodical fighting to clear the Germans off successive ridge lines (the Battle of San Marino).

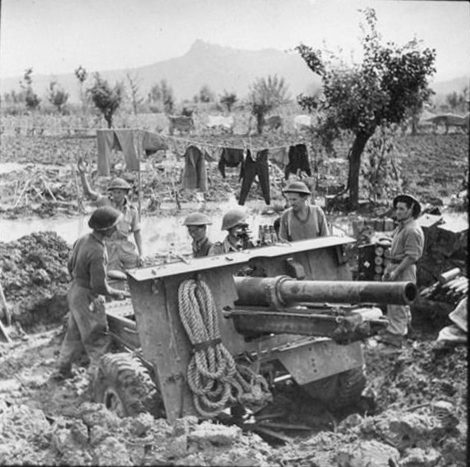
25-pounder and crew in a waterlogged position across the Rubicon, October 1944.

On the night of 27/28 September, the 56th Division attacked Savignano sul Rubicone on the Fiumicino river, supported by a 90-minute barrage fired by the heavily reinforced divisional artillery. Nevertheless, the attack failed, as did attempts to renew it on 29/30 September and 1 October. Later in October, the badly weakened 56th Division was relieved in the line. While the infantry were recuperating, 56th Division's artillery was brought up to reinforce V Corps' fire-plan for the capture of Forlì and the attempted crossings of the Montone on 8 November.

56th Division returned to the fighting in December to cover the Lamone crossing (2–13 December) and then to clear the ground between the Lamone and the Senio, forcing its way into Sant'Andrea on 31 December. However, ammunition shortages limited the use of the artillery.

For Eighth Army's Spring offensive in 1945 (Operation Grapeshot), 56th Division was responsible for the operations on Lake Comacchio to outflank the Senio line (5/6, 10/11 and 13 April) allowing it to breach the Argenta Gap (15–19 April) despite the shortage of artillery ammunition. Once through the gap, 56th Division drove on through German rearguards to the Po, arriving on 25 April and crossing immediately. The division reached Venice on 29 April. Here, it was halted due to shortage of fuel. The Surrender of Caserta came into force on 2 May, ending hostilities in the Italian theatre.

56th Division was made responsible for protecting lines of communication to the disputed city of Trieste in the immediate aftermath of the fighting. 113th (Home Counties) Field Regiment was placed in suspended animation on 10 November 1945.

== Postwar ==
When the TA was reconstituted in 1947, 57th Fd Rgt was reformed as 257 (Home Counties) Fd Rgt. Once again it was part of 44th (HC) Division. In 1955, the unit's title was changed to 257 (County of Sussex) Fd Rgt.

Meanwhile, 113th Field Rgt changed role and was reformed in 1947 as 313 (Sussex) Heavy Anti-Aircraft Rgt at Worthing. It was assigned to 99 (AA) AGRA, which became 99 AA Brigade the following year.

When Anti-Aircraft Command was disbanded in 1955, 313 (Sussex) HAA Rgt was merged with 258 (Sussex) Light AA Rgt, 344 (Sussex Yeomanry) HAA Rgt and 641 (Sussex) HAA Rgt to form 258 (Sussex Yeomanry) LAA Rgt, with R Battery at Worthing formed by 313 and 641 HAA Rgts. When 257 (County of Sussex) Field Rgt joined this amalgamation on 4 October 1961, it became 257 (Sussex Yeomanry) Fd Rgt with RHQ at Brighton.

== Uniforms and insignia ==
The original uniform of the Brighton AVC was of mixed grey Oxford cloth. The tunic had black Braid on the cuffs and collars and it is believed that a black stripe was worn down the trousers. A peaked Forage cap was worn with a white medal grenade badge and similar grenade badges were worn on the shoulder straps. When the guns were hauled by hired horses, the civilian carters wore a form of straw Boater with a ribbon bearing the corps title, similar to a naval Cap tally.

The 3rd Sussex AVC wore a forage cap badge consisting of an oval surmounted by a crown and inscribed 'S A III V C' at the top and 'H I C' at the bottom in Old English letters, with an oak tree in the centre. From 1878 a standard RA helmet with ball Finial was worn with 'FIRST ('2nd', 'THIRD', 'FOURTH') SUSSEX ARTILLERY VOLUNTEERS' on the scrolls of the helmet plate. The band wore a scarlet plume in place of the ball finial, and a helmet plate of crowned star pattern with sheet music and musical instruments superimposed.

The Other Ranks' waist belt clasp ca 1890–1908 was a rectangular plate surrounded by a scroll inscribed '1st SUSSEX VOLUNTEER ARTILLERY' worn with a brown leather belt, pouch and pouch belt.

The two men of No 6 (Railwaymen's) Garrison Company responsible for driving the armoured train wore silver arm badges bearing a locomotive and the word 'DRIVER' and 'FIREMAN'

From 1908 to 1919, the men of the TF Sussex batteries wore a brass shoulder title 'T/RFA/SUSSEX' on their service dress, while the men of the Brigade Ammunition Column wore 'T/RFA/HOME COUNTIES'.

From 1955 to 1961, 257 Fd Rgt wore a supplementary shoulder title 'COUNTY OF SUSSEX' embroidered in yellow on a navy background, immediately below the 'ROYAL ARTILLERY' title in red on navy blue.

== Honorary Colonels ==
The following served as Honorary Colonel of the unit:

- Charles Smith Hannington, former CO, appointed 9 January 1878.
- Sir Julian Goldsmid, 3rd Bt, MP, appointed 17 August 1881.
- Spencer Cavendish, 8th Duke of Devonshire, appointed (to 2nd Sussex) 5 March 1887.
- Sir Charles Boxall, KCB, VD, former CO, appointed (to 1st Sussex) 17 June 1896.
- Sir Berry Cusack-Smith, 5th Bt, KCMG, appointed 20 May 1917.
- Sir Alleyne Percival Boxall, 2nd Bt, OBE, TD, former CO, appointed 8 July 1929.

== Prominent members ==
- Sir Reginald Blaker, 2nd Bt, MP, served in 57th Field Brigade (commissioned 2nd lieutenant 11 December 1923, lieutenant 11 December 1925, captain 1 August 1930, major 8 March 1935) and fought in the Second World War.

== See also ==
- Shoreham Redoubt
