= Lothian Nicholson (British Army officer, born 1865) =

British Army officer (1865–1933)

Major-General Sir Lothian Nicholson KCB CMG
- Nicholson in 1919
- Born: Cecil Lothian Nicholson; 1 November 1865; Kensington, London, England
- Died: 3 March 1933 (aged 67); Elham, Kent, England
- Military career
- Branch: British Army
- Rank: Major-General
- Commands: 2nd Battalion, East Lancashire Regiment; 16th Brigade; 34th Division; Eastern Division of the British Army of the Rhine; 55th (West Lancashire) Infantry Division
- Conflicts: First World War
- Awards: Knight Commander of the Order of the Bath; Companion of the Order of St Michael and St George

Major-General Sir Cecil Lothian Nicholson KCB CMG (1 November 1865 – 3 March 1933) was a British Army officer.

== Military career ==
Born on 1 November 1865 in Kensington, London, the son of Sir Lothian Nicholson, a former governor of Gibraltar and current British Army officer, and Mary Romilly. After attending the Royal Military College, Sandhurst, Nicholson was commissioned as a subaltern, with the rank of second lieutenant, into the Princess of Wales's Own Yorkshire Regiment on 29 August 1885.

In May 1891 he was appointed as an aide-de-camp to his father, now a full general, and was promoted to lieutenant in February 1893. He attended the Staff College, Camberley, from 1893 to 1894.

In October 1905 he became brigade major of the 15th Infantry Brigade.

He served as a general staff officer, grade 2 (GSO2) in May 1911. Having transferred at some point to the Worcestershire Regiment, he was again transferred, this time to the East Lancashire Regiment, as a lieutenant colonel in February 1912. He later became commanding officer (CO) of the 2nd Battalion, East Lancashires.

He served on the Western Front from November 1914 and commanded his battalion at the Battle of Neuve Chapelle in March 1915 where he was wounded. He was promoted to brevet colonel in June 1915. Two months after being promoted to the temporary rank of brigadier general, in June 1915, he went on to succeed Major General Edward Ingouville-Williams in command of the 16th Infantry Brigade, and led the brigade at Hooge in August. In July 1916 he was promoted to temporary major general and became general officer commanding (GOC) 34th Division, again taking over from Ingouville-Williams, who had been killed, commanding it at the Battle of the Somme in the autumn of 1916, the Battle of Arras in April 1917 and the Battle of the Lys in April 1918 as well as subsequent battles on the Western Front. He was promoted to substantive major general in June 1918.

He was appointed a Companion of the Order of St Michael and St George in the 1916 Birthday Honours and a Companion of the Order of the Bath in the 1918 New Year Honours. He was then advanced to Knight Commander of the Order of the Bath in the 1919 Birthday Honours.

He went on to become GOC the Eastern Division of the British Army of the Rhine in March 1919.

He was appointed colonel of the East Lancashire Regiment on 20 May 1920, taking over from General Sir Percy Lake. He was GOC of the 55th (West Lancashire) Infantry Division in April 1921 before retiring from the army in April 1925.

He died in March 1933 at the age of 67.

Military offices
Preceded by Edward Ingouville-Williams	GOC 34th Division; 1916–1919	Succeeded by Post disbanded
Preceded by Sir Reginald Barnes	GOC 55th (West Lancashire) Infantry Division; 1921–1925	Succeeded by Hugo de Pree
