= George Weir (British Army officer) =

British Army officer

General Sir George Weir KCB CMG DSO DL
- Born: 1 December 1876; Upton upon Severn, Worcestershire
- Died: 15 November 1951 (aged 74)
- Military career
- Allegiance: United Kingdom
- Branch: British Army
- Service years: 1899–1938
- Rank: General
- Commands: 84th Brigade; Bombay District; 55th (West Lancashire) Division; British Troops in Egypt
- Conflicts: Second Boer War; First World War
- Awards: KCB, CMG, DSO, Croix de Guerre
- Other work: Deputy Lieutenant of Worcestershire; Vice-Chairman of the Worcester Territorial Army Association

General Sir George Alexander Weir KCB CMG DSO DL (1 December 1876 – 15 November 1951) was a British Army officer who served in the Second Boer War and the First World War.

== Early life ==
George Weir was born in Upton upon Severn, Worcestershire, on 1 December 1876 to Dr Archibald Weir of Malvern. He was educated at Harrow School and Trinity College, Cambridge. In 1917, he married Margaret Irene, daughter of Robert More of Bexhill; the couple had a son and a daughter.

== Military career ==
Weir served in South Africa between 1899 and 1901 as a non-commissioned volunteer in the Worcestershire Yeomanry and was mentioned in despatches twice and awarded four clasps to his Queen's Medal. After about six months, he was commissioned as a second lieutenant and transferred into the Regular Army on 11 January 1902 as a captain on probation in the 3rd Dragoon Guards, the appointment being confirmed the following year. He was subsequently seconded for service with a Provisional Regiment of Dragoons from January 1903.

He was promoted to major in July 1912.

By 1914, Weir had passed staff college and attained the rank of major. He was on 29 June appointed to the Cavalry School as an instructor.

At the start of the First World War just a few weeks later he deployed with the 4th Cavalry Brigade, as a staff captain, to France with the British Expeditionary Force (BEF). Soon afterwards, in October, he was appointed GSO2 of the newly formed 2nd (Cavalry) Division and in June 1915, he became commanding officer of the 2nd Battalion, Royal Irish Rifles and was slightly wounded in September. In October, Weir was promoted to the temporary rank of brigadier general and took command of the 28th Division's 84th Infantry Brigade. The brigade, together with the rest of the division, was almost immediately transferred to the Macedonian front, where it remained for the rest of the war, with Weir as its commander until March 1918. He was promoted to brevet lieutenant colonel in January 1917 and brevet colonel in January 1918.

During his war service during this period, Weir was wounded, mentioned in despatches, and awarded the Distinguished Service Order.

After the war, in 1922, Weir was appointed as Commandant of the Equitation School and Inspector of Cavalry. In 1927, he was posted to India as General Officer Commanding, Bombay District, and in September 1929 he succeeded Field Marshal Sir William Robertson as colonel of the 3rd Dragoon Guards.

In 1932 he took command of the 55th (West Lancashire) Division of the Territorial Army. In October 1933 he was promoted to lieutenant general. In 1934 he became General Officer Commanding the British Troops in Egypt (re-titled as General Officer Commanding-in-Chief in 1936), and was promoted to full general on 12 October 1937. He relinquished this position in April 1938 when he retired from the army.

== Honorary roles and retirement ==
Weir retired from the Army on 12 April 1938 and joined the Officers' Reserve (until December 1943).

Weir held appointments as Honorary Colonel to the 3rd Carabiniers (Prince of Wales's Dragoon Guards) (September 1929 until December 1946), to the 8th Battalion, The Worcestershire Regiment (TA) (June 1938 until December 1946) and the 639th Heavy Regiment, Royal Artillery (The Worcestershire Regiment) (January 1947 until September 1949).

Weir was Deputy Lieutenant of Worcestershire from 26 June 1941 and served as Vice-Chairman of the Worcester Territorial Army Association. He died on 15 November 1951.

Military offices
Preceded by Harold Higginson	GOC 55th (West Lancashire) Division; 1932–1934	Succeeded by James Cooke-Collis
Preceded by Sir John Burnett-Stuart	GOC-in-C the British Troops in Egypt; 1934–1938	Succeeded by Sir Robert Gordon-Finlayson
