= 53rd Brigade (United Kingdom) =

53rd Brigade 53rd Infantry Brigade
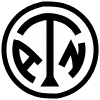
- British 18th (Eastern) Division insignia
- Active: 1914-1919; 1939-1942
- Country: United Kingdom
- Branch: Territorial Army
- Type: Infantry
- Size: Brigade
- Part of: 18th (Eastern) Division; 18th Infantry Division
- Engagements: Battle of Muar (Malayan Campaign); Battle of Singapore

Commanders
- Notable commanders: Sir William Hickue; Harold Higginson

The 53rd Brigade was an infantry brigade of the British Army that saw active service in both the First and Second World Wars. In the First World War, the brigade served with 18th (Eastern) Division and during the Second with the 18th Infantry Division.

== First World War ==
The 53rd Brigade was raised in 1914 during the Great War and was part of the 18th (Eastern) Division. Both the brigade and division were part of Lord Kitchener's New Armies and fought on the Western Front from 1915 to 1918.

=== Order of battle ===
- 8th (Service) Battalion, Norfolk Regiment (disbanded February 1918)
- 8th (Service) Battalion, Suffolk Regiment (disbanded February 1918)
- 10th (Service) Battalion, Essex Regiment
- 6th (Service) Battalion, Princess Charlotte of Wales's (Royal Berkshire Regiment) (disbanded February 1918)
- 7th (Service) Battalion, Queen's Own (Royal West Kent Regiment) (from February 1918)
- 8th (Service) Battalion, Princess Charlotte of Wales's (Royal Berkshire Regiment) (from February 1918)
- 53rd Machine Gun Company, Machine Gun Corps (formed 13 February 1916, moved to 18th Battalion, Machine Gun Corps 16 February 1918)
- 53rd Trench Mortar Battery (formed 17 June 1916)

== Second World War ==
After the war, the brigade and the division were disbanded in 1919. However, the brigade was reformed, as the 53rd Infantry Brigade, on 18 September 1939, after the outbreak of the Second World War, in the Territorial Army from the redesignation of the 163rd Infantry Brigade, originally part of the 54th (East Anglian) Infantry Division. The brigade was assigned to the 18th Infantry Division, a duplicate of the 54th Division. During the early years of the war, the brigade remained with the 18th Division in the United Kingdom, mainly on training duties and on home defence and anticipating a German invasion. However, the invasion never arrived. In late 1941, the brigade was sent, with the rest of the 18th Division, overseas, initially to the Middle East but later to Singapore after Japan entered the war in December. The brigade landed first and fought in the short but bitter and violent Battle of Singapore where they were forced to surrender to the Imperial Japanese Army and became prisoners for the next three years, and received extremely harsh and degrading treatment.

=== Order of battle ===
- 5th Battalion, Royal Norfolk Regiment
- 6th Battalion, Royal Norfolk Regiment
- 7th Battalion, Royal Norfolk Regiment (until 1 November 1939)
- 2nd Battalion, Cambridgeshire Regiment (from 1 November 1939)
- 53rd Infantry Brigade Anti-Tank Company (formed 23 September, disbanded 14 December 1940)
