= Gilmour Anderson =

Sir Gilmour Anderson
- Born: 29 April 1914; Hillhead, Glasgow, Scotland
- Died: 12 December 1977 (aged 63) Glasgow, Scotland
- Allegiance: United Kingdom
- Branch: British Army
- Service years: 1939–1945
- Rank: Brigadier
- Service number: 87944
- Commands: 16th Infantry Brigade
- Conflicts: Second World War
- Awards: Knight Bachelor, Commander of the Order of the British Empire

Brigadier Sir Gilmour Menzies Anderson CBE (29 April 1914 – 12 December 1977) was an officer of the British Army and Conservative and Unionist Party politician.

== Early life ==
Anderson was born in Hillhead, Glasgow, the son of William Menzies Anderson DSO MC and Jessie Jack Gilmour. He was educated at the High School of Glasgow and Glasgow University. He trained as a solicitor and started to practice law in 1938.

== Military career ==
On 24 May 1939 Anderson was commissioned as a 2nd lieutenant into the 6th Battalion, Highland Light Infantry (City of Glasgow Regiment), a Territorial Army unit. In September 1939 his battalion was fully mobilised following the outbreak of the Second World War although he was not to see action with it. Between 1942 and 1945 Anderson served with the Chindits in the Burma campaign. On 16 December 1943 he was made a Member of the Order of the British Empire for his services to Brigadier Orde Wingate during the campaign. From December 1944 to July 1945, he was Commanding Officer of the 16th Infantry Brigade and led the brigade during the Second Chindit Campaign. He left the Army after the war with the rank of brigadier.

== Political career ==
Anderson was elected to the Glasgow Corporation as a Conservative in 1945 and sat until 1947. From 1954 to 1957 he was Chairman of Glasgow Unionist Association and from 1960 to 1961 he was President of the Scottish Unionist Association. In January 1956 he was made a Commander of the Order of the British Empire. He was made a Knight bachelor for political services in Scotland in February 1962. In 1967 Anderson became Chairman of the Conservative Party in Scotland, retiring from the role in 1971.

== Personal life ==
He married Ivy Beryl Shairp (née Chadwick) in 1943. Together they had one daughter, plus one step-son & one step-daughter, both adopted, from Mrs Shairp's previous marriage. He died in Glasgow in 1977.
