= 174th Field Regiment, Royal Artillery =

8th Defence Regiment, RA 174th Field Regiment, RA
- Royal Artillery cap badge
- Active: 4 October 1940–10 March 1943
- Country: United Kingdom
- Branch: British Army
- Role: Field artillery
- Size: 3 Batteries
- Part of: 55th (West Lancashire) Infantry Division

The 174th Field Regiment was a unit of Britain's Royal Artillery (RA) during the Second World War. Originally formed to man beach defence batteries, it was later converted to field artillery. It served in Home Forces and supplied trained gunners to the fighting fronts, but saw no active service. It was disbanded in 1943.

== 8th Defence Regiment ==
After the British Expeditionary Force was evacuated from Dunkirk and the United Kingdom was threatened with invasion, a crash programme of installing coastal artillery batteries was implemented in the summer of 1940.

Later, as the Home Defence strategy developed, the Royal Artillery formed a number of 'Defence Batteries' to deploy around the coastline for general beach defence. These were not part of the RA's Coast Artillery branch, nor were they included in the field forces under Commander-in-Chief, Home Forces, but equipped with whatever old guns were available they freed up scarce field artillery from static beach defence for the mobile counter-attack forces. Most of these batteries were formed on 1 September 1940, and they were grouped into regiments from 4 October. 8th Defence Regiment was formed at Leven, East Riding of Yorkshire, with 930–934 Defence Batteries. On 15 March 1941 931 and 934 Defence Btys were disbanded.

== 174th Field Regiment ==
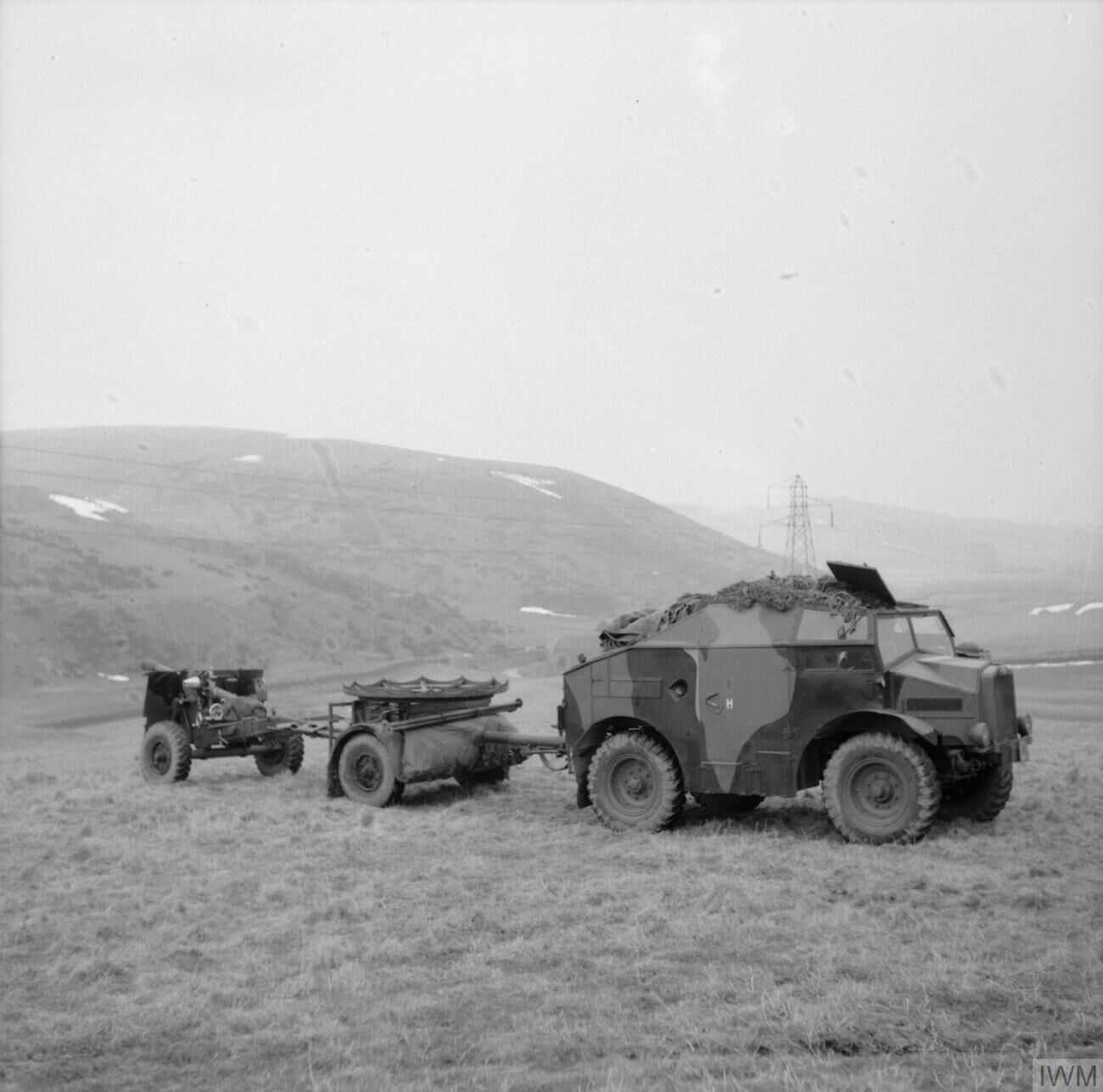
A 25-pounder gun and Quad tractor on a training exercise in the UK.

By the beginning of 1942 the imminent threat of invasion had passed, the coast artillery batteries were fully established, and the RA required gunners for the field forces. The remaining Defence Regiments in the UK were disbanded or converted into field artillery. On 12 January 1942 8th Defence Rgt at Neswick Hall, Driffield, East Riding, was converted into 174th Field Regiment, and 930, 932 and 933 Defence Btys were designated A, B and C Btys. A, B and C Btys were redesignated P, Q and R on 11 March. At this period the establishment of a field regiment was three batteries, each of two troops of four 25-pounder guns.

Divisional insignia of 55th (West Lancashire) Division.

On 25 July 1942 the regiment was assigned to 55th (West Lancashire) Infantry Division, which had recently been placed on a lower establishment as a home defence formation with no immediate prospect of overseas service. At the time the division was in Northern Command, moving at the beginning of 1943 to South Western District.

On 1 January 1943 the regiment's batteries were numbered as 159, 160 (Note: A previous 160 Bty had existed in the Royal Field Artillery between 1919 and 1920.) and 161 Field Btys. But on 9 January the batteries were mobilised as independent batteries and later posted to units in Middle East Forces as follows:

- 159 Field Bty – joined 32nd Field Rgt, converted to 32nd Heavy Rgt 18 September 1943
- 160 Field Bty – joined 57th (Home Counties) Field Rgt 10 June 1943
- 161 Field Bty – joined 121st (West Riding) Field Rgt 20 June 1943

Regimental HQ (RHQ) of 174th Field Rgt remained without any batteries to command until 10 March when it was disbanded and the personnel used to reform RHQ of the disbanded 52nd (Bedfordshire Yeomanry) Heavy Rgt at Fleetwood in Lancashire, with new batteries formed from coast artillery personnel.
