= Edward Ingouville-Williams =

British Army general (1861-1916)

Major-General Edward Ingouville-Williams CB DSO
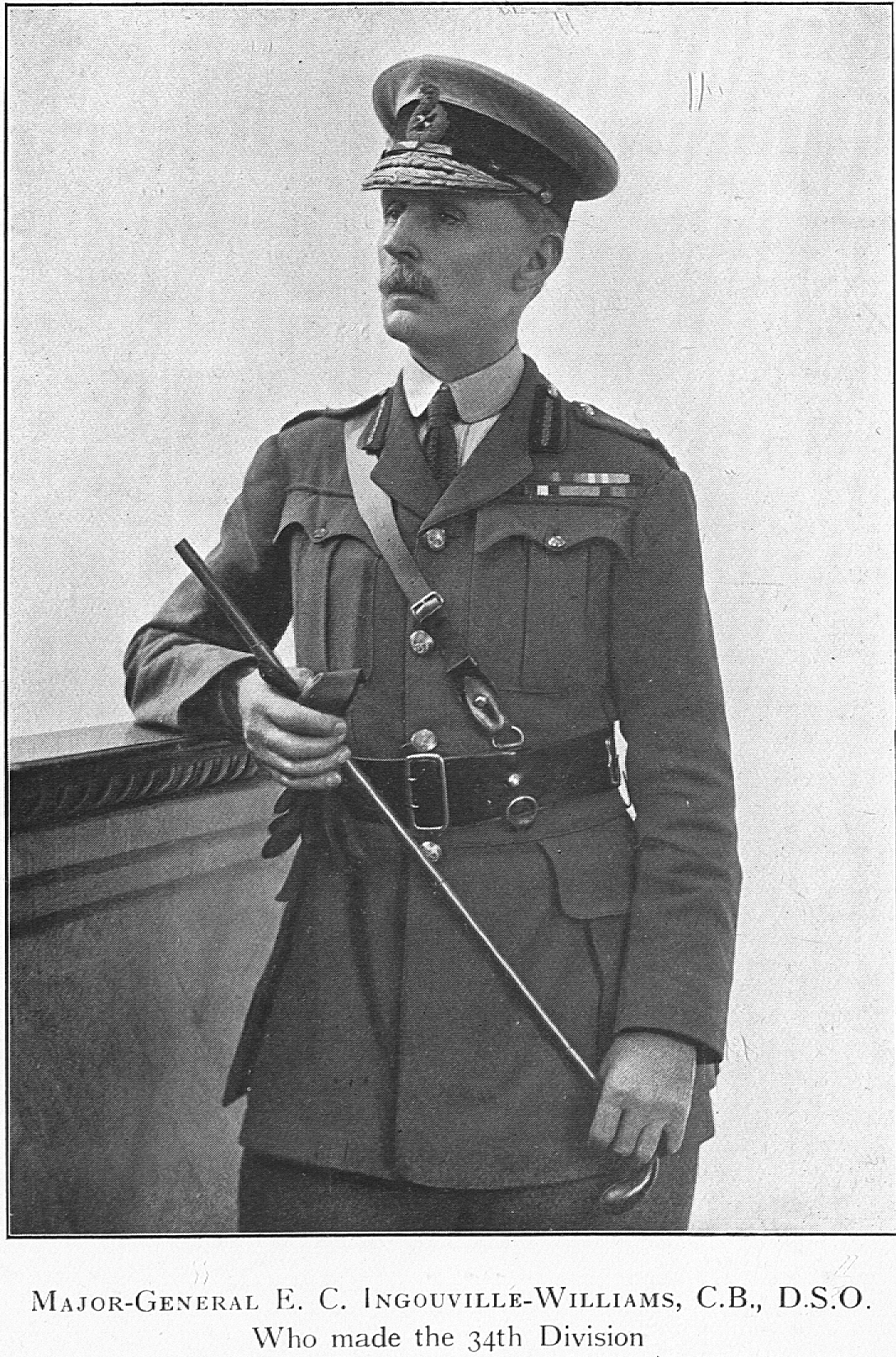
- Born: Edward Charles Ingouville-Williams; 13 December 1861; Purbrook, Hampshire, England
- Died: 22 July 1916 (aged 54); Somme, France
- Military career
- Allegiance: United Kingdom
- Branch: British Army
- Service years: 1881–1916
- Rank: Major-General
- Nickname: "Inky Bill"
- Units: Buffs (East Kent Regiment); Worcestershire Regiment
- Commands: 2nd Battalion, Worcestershire Regiment; 16th Brigade; 34th Division
- Conflicts: Nile Expedition: Battle of Atbara; Battle of Khartoum; Second Boer War: Relief of Ladysmith; First World War: Battle of the Somme
- Awards: Companion of the Order of the Bath; Distinguished Service Order; Mentioned in dispatches (4)

Major-General Edward Charles Ingouville-Williams CB DSO (13 December 1861 – 22 July 1916) was a British Army officer of the First World War. He was killed in action while serving as commander of the 34th Division during the Battle of the Somme in July 1916.

== Early life and military career ==
Edward Charles Ingouville-Williams was born on 13 December 1861 in Purbrook, Hampshire, to General Sir John W. C. Williams, an officer of the Royal Marines, and Georgiana Isabella, the daughter of a wealthy landowner.

He was commissioned as a subaltern, with the rank of second lieutenant, in the East Kent Regiment (3rd Regiment of Foot; known as "the Buffs") on 23 April 1881. Promoted to lieutenant on 1 July, he participated in the Nile Expedition (1884–1885) and served as adjutant to the regiment from 1894 to 1898 after promotion to captain on 1 November 1892. He was seconded to the Egyptian Army in 1898 and 1899, during which time he was appointed a brevet major in November 1898 and took part in the Battle of Atbara, and the Battle of Khartoum, for which he was later mentioned in dispatches. He was promoted from supernumerary captain to captain in June 1899.

From 1899 to 1902, he served under Lieutenant General Sir Charles Warren in the Second Boer War, which broke out in October 1899. He was present at the Relief of Ladysmith and was twice mentioned in dispatches during the war. His brother George Albanus, a major in the South Staffordshire Regiment, was killed in action during the conflict. By the end of the war, he had been awarded the Queen's South Africa Medal King's South Africa Medal, and the Distinguished Service Order (DSO), and had been promoted to lieutenant colonel, after having held the local rank earlier in the war. He changed his name to Ingouville-Williams in 1902, apparently in memory of his mother, whose maiden name was Ingouville.

In April 1903, Ingouville-Williams was transferred from the East Kents to the Worcestershire Regiment as a major. The next year he took command of the 2nd Battalion of the Worcesters, with whom he spent much of the following five years in British India, during which time he was promoted twice, first to lieutenant colonel in March 1904 and then to brevet colonel in December 1905. After completing his tour as his battalion's commanding officer (CO), he was, after being promoted to the full rank of colonel in March 1908, placed on a period of half-pay.

He was appointed a Companion of the Order of the Bath in June 1910 and went on to serve as commandant of the School of Instruction for Mounted Infantry in March. After relinquishing command of the school to Sydney Lawford, he then became general officer commanding (GOC) of the 16th Infantry Brigade, part of the 6th Division, from June 1912 until the outbreak of the First World War just over two years later. As a result of his new appointment, he received a temporary promotion to the rank of brigadier general.

== First World War ==
Ingouville-Williams deployed to France with his brigade, and the rest of the 6th Division, in September 1914 to reinforce the British Expeditionary Force (BEF).

After seeing action at the First Battle of the Aisne, he commanded the brigade during the Battle of Armentières in October. He directed the brigade's operations throughout the First Battle of Ypres, which lasted until late November and saw the BEF sustain severe casualties, and led it during the severe winter of 1914 and into 1915.

In April 1915, he led the brigade during the Second Battle of Ypres, specifically during the intense fighting at St. Julien and Hooge, where his men were among the first to experience German gas attacks.

He remained in command of the 16th Brigade until June 1915, by which time he had been in command for nearly three years, when he was promoted to major general, "for distinguished service in the Field", and sent to Britain to command the newly formed 34th Division, a Kitchener's Army unit.

After training in England, he took the 34th to the Western Front in January 1916 and led the division at the beginning of the Battle of the Somme in summer 1916. He earned another four mentions in despatches during the war. On 22 July, Ingouville-Williams and his aide-de-camp personally inspected the ground on which the division was expected to fight the following week. On his way back, he was caught in an artillery barrage and was killed instantly after being struck by a piece of shrapnel.

He was buried at Warloy-Baillon Communal Cemetery extension in France.

Military offices
Preceded by New post	GOC 34th Division; 1915–1916	Succeeded by Lothian Nicholson
