= 84th Brigade (United Kingdom) =

Military unit

The 84th Brigade was a formation of the British Army. It was originally formed from regular army battalions serving away from home in the British Empire. It was assigned to the 28th Division and served on the Western Front and the Macedonian Front during the First World War. The Brigade was temporarily attached to the 5th Division between March and April 1915.

== Formation ==
The infantry battalions did not all serve at once, but all were assigned to the brigade during the war.

- 2nd Battalion, Northumberland Fusiliers
- 1st Battalion, Suffolk Regiment
- 2nd Battalion, Cheshire Regiment
- 1st Battalion, Welsh Regiment
- 1/6th (Glamorgan) Battalion, Welsh Regiment
- 1/1st Battalion, Monmouthshire Regiment
- 1/12th Battalion, London Regiment
- 84th Machine Gun Company
- 84th SAA Section Ammunition Column
- 84th Trench Mortar Battery

== General Officers Commanding ==
Commanding officers
Rank	Name	Date appointed	Notes
Brigadier-General	F. Wintour	25 December 1914	Sick 23 February 1915
Lieutenant-Colonel	W. B. Wallace	23 February 1915	Acting
Brigadier-General	L. J. Bols	24 February 1915	
Brigadier-General	T. H. F. Pearse	7 September 1915	
Brigadier-General	G. A. Weir	13 October 1915	
Lieutenant-Colonel	F. A. Greer	1 December 1916	Acting
Brigadier-General	G. A. Weir	14 February 1917	
Brigadier-General	F. C. Nisbet	23 March 1918	
Brigadier-General	R. H. Hare	8 March 1919	
Lieutenant-Colonel	H. R. A. Hunt	3 April 1919	Acting
Brigadier-General	R. H. Hare	28 June 1919	
Lieutenant-Colonel	R. C. Dobbs	14 August 1919	Acting
Lieutenant-Colonel	J. L. Furney	9 October 1919	Acting
Brigadier-General	R. H. Hare	17 October 1919	
Lieutenant-Colonel	J. L. Furney	25 October 1919	Acting
Lieutenant-Colonel	A. H. Yatman	5 November 1919	Acting
Colonel	H. A. V. Cummins	21 December 1919	Acting
Lieutenant-Colonel	A. H. Yatman	29 December 1919	Acting
Colonel	C. Bonham-Carter	2 January 1920	Acting
Brigadier-General	W. B. Emery	29 February 1920	Converted into an "Army Brigade" in Turkey 25 September 1922
