= 16th Infantry Brigade (United Kingdom) =

Infantry brigade of the British Army during World Wars I and II

16th Brigade 16th Infantry Brigade
- Active: 1914-1918; 1939–1945
- Country: United Kingdom
- Branch: British Army
- Type: Infantry
- Role: Infantry
- Size: Brigade
- Part of: 8th Infantry Division; 6th Infantry Division; 70th Infantry Division
- Engagements: First World War; Second World War

The 16th Infantry Brigade was an infantry brigade of the British Army that saw active service during the Second Boer War and the First and Second World Wars.

== History ==
=== Second Boer War ===
During the Second Boer War, the 16th brigade was active in South Africa as part of the 8th Division from early 1900 until the war ended in 1902. It was under the command of major-general Barrington Campbell, and included the following battalions:

- 2nd Battalion Grenadier Guards, 2nd Battalion Scots Guards, 2nd Battalion East Yorkshire Regiment, 1st Battalion Leinster Regiment

=== First World War ===
The brigade was part of the 6th Infantry Division during the First World War. It served on the Western Front throughout the War.

==== Order of battle ====
Component units included:

- 1st Battalion, the Buffs
- 1st Battalion, the Leicestershire Regiment (left November 1915)
- 1st Battalion, the King's Shropshire Light Infantry
- 2nd Battalion, the York and Lancaster Regiment
- 1/5th Battalion, the Loyal North Lancashire Regiment (joined February 1915, left June 1915)
- 8th Battalion, the Bedfordshire Regiment (joined 17 November 1915, disbanded 16 February 1918)
- 16th Machine Gun Company (formed in February 1916, left to move into 6th Machine Gun Battalion 1 March 1918)
- 16th Trench Mortar Battery

==== Officers commanding ====
The following commanded the 16th Infantry Brigade during the First World War:

- Brigadier-General E. C. Ingouville-Williams (at mobilization)
- Brigadier-General C. L. Nicholson (16 June 1915)
- Brigadier-General W. L. Osborn (26 July 1916)
- Brigadier-General H. A. Walker (26 October 1917)
- Brigadier-General P. W. Brown (16 October 1918 - temporary)
- Brigadier-General W. G. Braithwaite (19 October 1918)

=== Second World War ===
The brigade was based in Palestine before the Second World War during the Arab revolt, and at the beginning of the war as part of the British 8th Infantry Division. It was later part of the British 6th Infantry Division which was redesignated as the British 70th Infantry Division on 10 October 1941. This brigade was involved in the breakout from Tobruk and after being transferred, along with the rest of the 70th Division, to India and Burma, it was transformed into a Chindit formation. It fought in the Second Chindit Campaign of 1944, commanded by Brigadier Gilmour Anderson. Battles which the brigade took part in included, Battle of Sidi Barrani, Battle of Bardia, Battle of Damascus, Battle of Tobruk (both stages).

==== Order of battle ====
According to War Office policy, regiments would be assigned to formations/commands for max of 3 years, and be rotated at the end of their tenure. Units which formed under the brigade during the war included:

- 2nd Battalion, Leicestershire Regiment, Mobilisation—12 May 1941 / 30 May 1941 – 14 October 1944
- 1st Battalion, South Staffordshire Regiment, Mobilisation—16 October 1939 / 7 May 1945 – 31 August 1945
- 1st Battalion, Welch Regiment, Mobilisation—6 November 1939
- 1st Battalion, Worcestershire and Sherwood Foresters, Mobilisation—6 January 1940
- 2nd Battalion, Rifle Brigade (The Prince Consort's Own), 15 October 1939 – 6 January 1940
- 2nd Battalion, West Yorkshire Regiment, 16 October 1939 – 5 December 1939
- 1st Battalion, Buffs (Royal East Kent Regiment), 28 December 1939 – 15 January 1940
- 1st Battalion, Argyll and Sutherland Highlanders, 17 January 1940 – 15 May 1941 / 30 May 1941 – 11 June 1941
- 2nd Battalion, Queen's Royal Regiment (West Surrey), 24 January 1940 – 22 October 1944
- 2nd Battalion, King's Own Royal Regiment (Lancaster), 11 June 1941 – 25 September 1943 / 15 October 1944 – 28 October 1944
- 1st Battalion, Lancashire Fusiliers, 15 October 1944 – 28 October 1944
- 1st Battalion, Cameronians (Scottish Rifles), 23 October 1944 – 5 August 1945
- 2nd Battalion, Duke of Wellington's Regiment, 29 October 1944 – 31 August 1945
- 1st Battalion, Bedfordshire and Hertfordshire Regiment, 29 October 1944 – 31 August 1945
- 4th Battalion, Border Regiment, 29 October 1944 – 20 February 1945
- 1st Battalion, King's Regiment (Liverpool), 6 May 1945 – 31 August 1945
- 1st Battalion, Royal Scots Fusiliers, 27 May 1945 – 31 August 1945
- 16th Infantry Brigade Anti-Tank Company, 20 September 1941 – 28 February 1942

During the period 26 February 1942 to 7 February 1943, when the brigade went to Ceylon, the following additional units were under its command:

- 51st (Westmorland and Cumberland) Field Regiment, Royal Artillery
- 2 Field Company, Royal Engineers
- 61 Company, Royal Army Service Corps
- 215th Field Ambulance, Royal Army Medical Corps

In September 1943 the brigade was re-organised for Long-range penetration role under Special Force. During this period, the brigade controlled (in addition to their regular units):

- 45th (South Western) Reconnaissance Regiment, Reconnaissance Corps — Forming 45 & 54 Columns, under command from 16 September 1943 – 17 October 1944 as infantry
- 2nd Battalion, Queen's Royal Regiment (West Surrey) — Forming 21 & 22 Columns
- 2nd Battalion, Leicestershire Regiment — Forming 17 & 71 Columns
- 51st/69th Infantry Regiment, Royal Artillery — Forming 51 & 69 Columns, under command from 18 October 1943 – 28 October 1944 as infantry

==== Officers Commanding ====
Commanding officers included:

- Brigadier C.E.N. Lomax
- Brigadier O.L. Roberts
- Brigadier A.R. Aslett
- Brigadier R.G. Price
- Brigadier B.E. Fergusson
- Brigadier C.J. Wilkinson
- Brigadier G.M. Anderson

== See also ==
- Order of Battle of the Chindits
- Battle of Tobruk
- British Army Order of Battle - September 1939
