= James Robertson (cricketer, born 1850) =

Scottish cricketer

James Robertson (10 November 1850 – 21 March 1927) was a Scottish cricketer.

Robertson was born in Wardieburn, Edinburgh and educated at Edinburgh Academy. He failed to win a blue at Oxford. He was a tall and athletically built Scot who was known for his Right-arm fast round-arm bowling, as well as his aggressive right-handed batting and good slip fielding.

He made his county debut for Middlesex aged 27 in 1878 (having made his first-class debut a year earlier for an England XI) and represented the county in 102 first-class matches until 1891. He took 6/22 on his Middlesex debut versus Surrey at Lord's. He took 289 wickets in his career at an average 22.03, with a personal best of 8/48 versus Nottinghamshire at Lord's in 1887.
