= Boxall baronets =

Extinct baronetcy in the Baronetage of the United Kingdom

- Escutcheon of the Boxall baronets of Cambridge Square, London
- Creation date: 1919
- Status: extinct
- Extinction date: 1945
- Motto: Spes mea in Deo, My hope is in God

The Boxall baronetcy, of Cambridge Square in the County of London was created on 4 September 1919, for the solicitor, Alleyne Boxall.

In 1900, Boxall had been created Baron Boxall, a peerage in the Duchy of Saxe-Coburg and Gotha by Alfred, Duke of Saxe-Coburg and Gotha for having helped the duke out of a financial embarrassment. Although Boxall had no connection with Germany, the title was created in the duke's own country (instead of the United Kingdom) as the Prime Minister, Lord Salisbury, advised against granting Boxall a British honour due to the nature of the case. Queen Victoria (mother of the duke) allowed Boxall to use the title in Britain but he later voluntarily relinquished it during World War I as it was considered an 'enemy title'. As a compensation, he was awarded the baronetcy in 1919.

On Boxall's death in 1927, the baronetcy passed to his son but the title became extinct upon the latter's death, without male heirs, in 1945.

== Boxall baronets, of Cambridge Square, London (1919) ==
- Sir Alleyne Alfred Boxall, 1st Baronet (1855–1927)
- Sir Alleyne Percival Boxall, 2nd Baronet (1882–1945)
