= 55th (West Lancashire) Infantry Division =

British Army Second World War division

55th (West Lancashire) Division 55th (West Lancashire) Motor Division 55th (West Lancashire) Infantry Division
- The divisional insignia, the Red Rose of Lancaster, used during the Second World War.
- Active: 1920–1945
- Country: United Kingdom
- Branch: Territorial Army (1920–1945)
- Type: Infantry; Motorised infantry
- Peacetime HQ: Liverpool

The 55th (West Lancashire) Infantry Division was an infantry division of the British Army's Territorial Army (TA) that was formed in 1920 and existed through the Second World War, although it did not see combat. The division had originally been raised in 1908 as the West Lancashire Division, part of the British Army's Territorial Force (TF). It fought in the First World War, as the 55th (West Lancashire) Division, and demobilised following the fighting. In 1920, the 55th (West Lancashire) Division started to reform. It was stationed in the county of Lancashire throughout the 1920s and 1930s, and was under-funded and under-staffed. In the late 1930s, the division was reduced from three to two infantry brigades and gave up some artillery and other support units to become a motorised formation, the 55th (West Lancashire) Motor Division. This was part of a British Army doctrine change that was intended to increase battlefield mobility.

Following the German occupation of Czechoslovakia, the division created new units around cadres of its own personnel, a process called "duplicating". The division then used these new formations to create its "duplicate", the 59th (Staffordshire) Motor Division. The 55th remained in the United Kingdom, in a defensive role, after the outbreak of the Second World War. In 1940, following the Battle of France, the motor division concept was abandoned. The division regained its third infantry brigade, and became the 55th (West Lancashire) Infantry Division. It remained within the United Kingdom, training for future operations as well as training replacements for combat units, and assigned to anti-invasion duties. By 1944, the division had been drained of many of its assets. The remnant of the division was used in Operation Fortitude, a deception effort that supported the Allied invasion of France. At the end of the war, the division was demobilised and not reformed.

== Background ==
The West Lancashire Division was formed in 1908, following the passing of the Territorial and Reserve Forces Act 1907 that created the Territorial Force (TF). The division was broken up between 1914 and 1915, to provide reinforcements for the British Expeditionary Force that was fighting in France during the First World War. It was reformed as the 55th (West Lancashire) Division in late 1915, deployed to the Western Front and fought during the Battles of the Somme, Passchendaele, and Estaires, and took part in the Hundred Days Offensive. During two years of war, 63,923 men served in the division, over half becoming casualties. Following the end of the war, in 1918, and through 1919, the division was demobilised. In April 1920, the division started the process of reforming in Lancashire, as part of Western Command. In 1921, the TF was reconstituted as the Territorial Army (TA) following the passage of the Territorial Army and Militia Act 1921. (Note: The TA was the reserve of the British regular army made up of part-time volunteers. Its intended role was the sole method of expanding the size of the British Armed Forces (comparable to the creation of Kitchener's Army during the First World War). First-line territorial formations would create a second-line division using a cadre of trained personnel and, if needed, a third division would be created. All TA recruits were required to take the general service obligation: if the British Government decided, territorial soldiers could be deployed overseas for combat (This avoided the complications of the First World War-era TF, whose members were not required to leave Britain unless they volunteered for overseas service, until the Military Service Act 1916.).)

== Interwar period ==
The 55th (West Lancashire) Division was headquartered and primarily based in Liverpool, although it had units throughout Lancashire. At various times units were located in Chester, Lancaster, Lichfield, Seaforth, Southport, and Warrington. The division was reformed with the 164th (North Lancashire), the 165th (Liverpool), and the 166th (South Lancashire and Cheshire) Infantry Brigades. On 19 July 1924, the division was reviewed by George V, during a visit to Liverpool. During the interwar period, TA formations and units were only permitted to recruit up to 60 per cent of their establishment. Due to chronic underfunding, the lack of a pressing national threat, and a diminished level of prestige associated with serving in the TA, it was rare for units to reach even this level of manpower. By the 1930s, this resulted in the TA having limited access to modern equipment, under-trained men, and officers with inadequate experience in command.

=== Motor division ===
The development of British military doctrine during the interwar period resulted in three types of division by the end of the 1930s: the infantry division; the mobile division (later called the armoured division); and the motor division. Historian David French wrote "the main role of the infantry ... was to break into the enemy's defensive position." This would then be exploited by the mobile division, followed by the motor divisions that would "carry out the rapid consolidation of the ground captured by the mobile divisions" therefore "transform[ing] the 'break-in' into a 'break-through'." French wrote that the motor division had a similar role to the German Army's motorised and light divisions, "but there the similarities ended." German motorised divisions contained three regiments (akin to a British brigade) and were equipped similarly to a regular infantry division, while their smaller light divisions contained a tank battalion. The British motor division, while being fully motorised and capable of transporting all their infantry, was "otherwise much weaker than normal infantry divisions" or their German counterparts as it was made up of only two brigades, had two artillery regiments as opposed to an infantry division's three, and contained no tanks.

In 1938, the army decided to create six motor divisions from TA units. Only three infantry divisions were converted before the war, including the 55th (West Lancashire). (Note: The other two were the 1st London and 50th (Northumbrian) divisions.) This resulted in the removal of infantry and artillery elements from the division. Many of the division's battalions were converted to new roles, and transferred to other branches of the army. For example: the 6th Liverpool Rifles were retrained and transferred to the Royal Engineers (RE), becoming the 38th (The King's Regiment) Anti-Aircraft Battalion, RE; the 5th King's Own Royal Regiment (Lancaster) was converted to artillery, becoming the 56th (King's Own) Anti-Tank Regiment, Royal Artillery; the 7th King's Regiment (Liverpool) became the 40th (The King's) Royal Tank Regiment. The division retained three brigades until March 1939, when the 164th Brigade was disbanded, bringing the division into line with the intention of the new organisation. Now the 55th (West Lancashire) Motor Division, it comprised the 165th (Liverpool) and the 166th (South Lancashire and Cheshire) Infantry Brigades.

=== Rearmament ===
During the 1930s, tensions increased between Germany and the United Kingdom and its allies. In late 1937 and throughout 1938, German demands for the annexation of the Sudetenland in Czechoslovakia led to an international crisis. To avoid war, the British Prime Minister Neville Chamberlain met with German Chancellor Adolf Hitler in September and brokered the Munich Agreement. The agreement averted a war and allowed Germany to annexe the Sudetenland. Although Chamberlain had intended the agreement to lead to further peaceful resolution of issues, relations between the two countries soon deteriorated. On 15 March 1939, Germany breached the terms of the agreement by invading and occupying the remnants of the Czech state.

On 29 March, British Secretary of State for War Leslie Hore-Belisha announced plans to increase the TA from 130,000 to 340,000 men and double the number of TA divisions. The plan was for existing TA divisions, referred to as the first-line, to recruit over their establishments (aided by an increase in pay for Territorials, the removal of restrictions on promotion which had hindered recruiting, construction of better-quality barracks and an increase in supper rations) and then form a new division, known as the second-line, from cadres around which the new divisions could be expanded. This process was dubbed "duplicating". The 55th (West Lancashire) Motor Division provided cadres to create a second line "duplicate" formation, which became the 59th (Staffordshire) Motor Division. By September, the 55th (West Lancashire) Motor Division had also reformed the 164th Brigade. Despite the intention for the army to grow, the programme was complicated by a lack of central guidance on the expansion and duplication process and a lack of facilities, equipment and instructors. In April 1939, limited conscription was introduced. At that time 34,500 men, all aged 20, were conscripted into the regular army, initially to be trained for six months before being deployed to the forming second line units. It had been envisioned by the War Office that the duplicating process and recruiting the required numbers of men would take no more than six months. The process varied widely between the TA divisions. Some were ready in weeks while others had made little progress by the time the Second World War began on 1 September.

== Second World War ==
=== Home defence ===
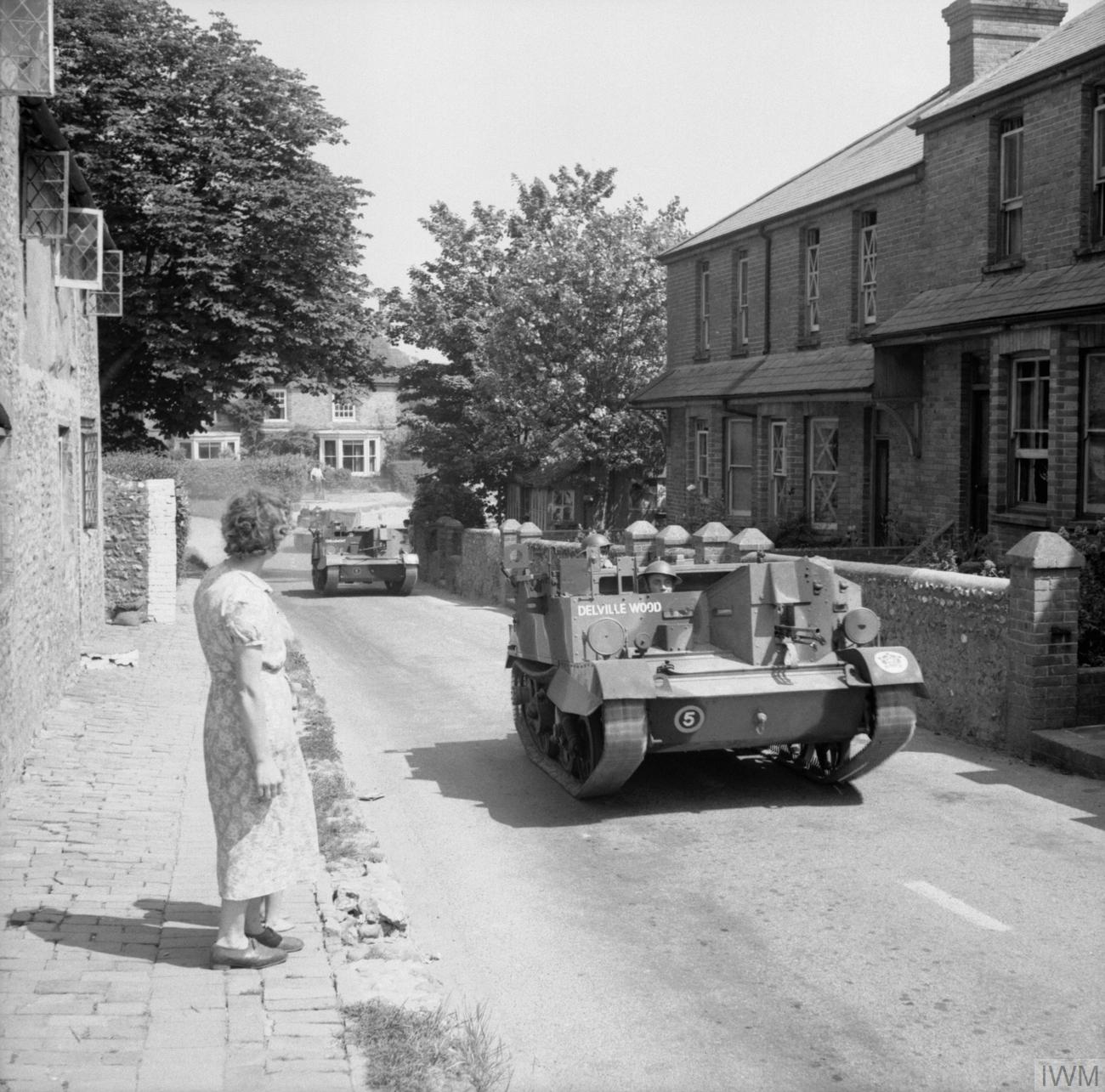
Universal Carriers of the 9th Battalion, King's Regiment (Liverpool), of the 164th Brigade, moving through a Sussex village, 3 July 1941.

On 4 September, the division established the second line duplicate of the 166th Brigade, the 177th. On 15 September, the 166th Infantry Brigade (renamed the 176th Infantry Brigade) and the 177th Brigade were transferred to the 59th (Staffordshire) Motor Division. This left the 55th (West Lancashire) Motor Division with the 164th and 165th Brigades. The former consisted of the 9th Battalion, King's Regiment (Liverpool), the 1/4th Battalion, the South Lancashire Regiment, and the 2/4th Battalion, South Lancashire Regiment. The 165th Brigade was made up of the 5th Battalion, King's Regiment (Liverpool), and the 1st and the 2nd Battalions, Liverpool Scottish (Queen's Own Cameron Highlanders). Major-General Vivian Majendie was the division's general officer commanding (GOC), and had been in command since 1938.

The division's initial war-time duties included deploying guards to the docks at Birkenhead, the Port of Liverpool, and the naval defences at Crosby, while also assisting the civilian authorities during air raids. On 6 September, the division fired its first shots of the war. Divisional anti-aircraft and machine guns fired on three aircraft flying low over the River Mersey. The shots missed, and the aircraft were later determined to be Royal Air Force Handley Page Hampden bombers.

The war deployment plan for the TA envisioned its divisions being sent overseas, as equipment became available, to reinforce the British Expeditionary Force (BEF) that had already been dispatched to Europe. The TA would join regular army divisions in waves as its divisions completed their training, the final divisions deploying a year after the war began. In October 1939, the Commander-in-Chief, Home Forces, General Walter Kirke, was tasked with drawing up a plan, codenamed Julius Caesar, to defend the United Kingdom from a potential German invasion. (Note: Julius was the codeword to bring troops to a state of readiness within eight hours. The codeword Caesar meant an invasion was imminent, and units were to be readied for immediate action. Kirke's plan assumed that the Germans would use 4,000 paratroopers, followed by 15,000 troops landed via civilian aircraft once airfields had been secured (Germany only actually had 6,000 such troops), and at least one division of 15,000 troops to be used in an amphibious assault.) As part of this plan, the division was assigned to Home Forces' reserve. It was transferred to Northern Command and moved to Charnwood Forest in Leicestershire. Here the division furthered its training, while also having to be ready to act as a counter-attack force for Julius Caesar in case of a German invasion between the Humber and The Wash. Other duties included the protection of RAF Finningley.

In January 1940, the division was used to obtain drafts for formations overseas as well as volunteers to man anti-aircraft guns on small ships. In March, the division was relieved as a reserve formation. It was assigned to Eastern Command the following month, and transferred to defend the coastline of Suffolk and then Essex. These moves were part of a larger effort by Kirke to reinforce the defences in the east of England, which he believed would be the location most in danger of an invasion as a result of the German operations on mainland Europe. Other than coastal defence, the division was also responsible for guarding Ipswich Airport, constructing roadblocks inland from potential invasion beaches, and providing mobile detachments to respond to any German airborne landings. In April, following the start of the Norwegian campaign, the division organised No. 4 Independent Company, which departed for Norway on 7 May. Following the conclusion of that campaign, many of these men joined the Commandos. As a result of the German victory in France and the return of the BEF following the Dunkirk evacuation, the division was not deployed overseas per the original TA deployment timeline.

The British Army began implementing lessons learnt from the campaign in France. This included a decision to base the standard division around three brigades, and the abandonment of the motor division concept. This process involved breaking up four-second-line territorial divisions to reinforce depleted formations and aid in transforming the Army's five motor divisions, each made up of two brigades, into infantry divisions made up of three brigades. As part of this process, on 23 June, the 66th Infantry Division was disbanded. This freed up the 199th Infantry Brigade and an artillery regiment to be transferred to the 55th (West Lancashire) Motor Division, which became the 55th (West Lancashire) Infantry Division. (Note: The other brigades of the 66th Division were transferred to the 1st London and the 59th (Staffordshire) divisions to complete their transition to infantry formations. 12th (Eastern) Infantry Division was disbanded on 11 July 1940, its brigades being allocated to 1st London and 2nd London Motor Divisions as part of their transition to infantry formations. 23rd (Northumbrian) Division was broken up on 30 June, one brigade being transferred to 50th (Northumberland) Motor Division. On 7 August, the 51st (Highland) Infantry Division was re-created by the re-designation of its second-line duplicate, the 9th (Highland) Infantry Division.) General Edmund Ironside, who had replaced Kirke, believed the division (along with the others which had remained in the UK) to be insufficiently trained, equipped, and unable to undertake offensive operations. The division was therefore assigned a static coastal defence role in Essex, while leaving enough troops available to deal with any German paratrooper landings that may occur in its area. Duties also included the digging and improving of defensive positions, and ongoing training. On paper, an infantry division was to have seventy-two 25-pounder field guns. By 31 May, the division only had eight such modern guns. These were supplemented by four First World War-vintage 18-pounder field guns, and eight 4.5 in (110 mm) howitzers of similar vintage. The division had only two anti-tank guns, against a nominal establishment of 48, and only 47 of the required 307 Boys anti-tank rifles. General Alan Brooke, who replaced Ironside, reviewed the division on 1 August. He recorded in his diary that the 55th (West Lancashire) Infantry Division "should be quite good with a bit of training."

The division remained in Essex until November 1940, when it was assigned to IV Corps. This was a reserve formation, based away from the coast, the intended role being to counterattack German landings in East Anglia. Elements of the division moved to more central locations, for example the two Liverpool Scottish battalions took up winter quarters in Oxfordshire. While based there, they conducted training in a counterattack role that involved moving to concentration areas behind units based along the south and southeast coasts. In February 1941, the 55th (West Lancashire) Infantry Division moved south to defend the Sussex coast. This included manning coastal defensive positions, being assigned to hunt down any German paratroopers, improving and expanding defences in their sector, and training. With the arrival of increased levels of ammunition, the men of the division were able to considerably improve their proficiency in the use of small arms and mortars. On 1 June 1941, Major-General William Duthie Morgan replaced Majendie as GOC. In July, the division was relieved from coastal defence. It relocated to Aldershot to act as a reserve formation, and increased the tempo of training. Morgan maintained his position until October, when he was wounded during a training exercise, and was replaced by Major-General Frederick Morgan. During the final months of 1941, the 55th (West Lancashire) Infantry Division started to provide drafts of men to other formations. This was followed by the division being placed on the lower establishment in January 1942. (Note: During the war, divisions of the British Army were organised as either higher or lower establishment formations. The former were intended for deployment overseas and combat, whereas the latter had been strictly detailed for home defence in a static role.) In December 1941, the 55th (West Lancashire) Infantry Division relocated to Yorkshire and was reassigned to Northern Command, and was spread out with troops based in the East Riding of Yorkshire and North Yorkshire. The intention of this deployment was to counter-attack any German landings along the coast or at nearby airfields. The 165th Brigade also spent some time at Catterick Garrison. During its stay with Northern Command, the majority of the time was spent training, from the battalion to the brigade level. The division relocated to Devon in January 1943, and was assigned to the South West District. The primary role now was to counter any raids conducted by German forces along the coast. This was in addition to continued training, guarding vulnerable points, and rendering assistance to nearby civilian authorities as needed after air raids. In June, the division lost five men killed following a German bombing raid. In December 1943, the division received drafts from anti-aircraft regiments. These men were then given a ten-week training course to make them viable drafts for infantry units. The same month, the 55th (West Lancashire) Infantry Division transferred to Northern Ireland, under the command of British Troops Northern Ireland. In Northern Ireland, the soldiers aided farmers, helped train elements of the reforming Belgian Army, and trained with newly arrived troops from the United States Army. The division continued to provide men to other formations through 1944.

=== Wind down and deception ===
In May 1944, the 55th (West Lancashire) Infantry Division was raised to higher establishment. The division did not increase in size; the war establishment (the paper strength) of a higher establishment infantry division, in this period, was 18,347 men. The 55th (West Lancashire), the 38th (Welsh), the 45th, the 47th (London), and the 61st Infantry Divisions had a combined total of 17,845 men. The division remained within the United Kingdom and was drained of manpower to a point that it was all but disbanded, and was then maintained as a deception formation. Of these 17,845 men, around 13,000 were available as replacements for the 21st Army Group fighting in France. The remaining 4,800 men were considered ineligible at that time for service abroad for a variety of reasons, including a lack of training or being medically unfit. Over the following six months, up to 75 per cent of these men would be deployed to reinforce 21st Army Group following the completion of their training and certification of fitness. For example, the two Liverpool Scottish battalions were used as training units and a source of reinforcements for other Scottish regiments. Entire units were also stripped from the division and deployed abroad; the 2nd Loyal Regiment (North Lancashire) (previously the 10th Battalion, Loyal Regiment) was transferred to Italy. While the 199th Brigade remained part of the division, it was attached to Northern Ireland District in July 1944. The same month, the division, minus the 199th Brigade, returned to the mainland and moved to southern Wales. The 199th Brigade, renumbered the 166th Brigade, physically rejoined the division in June 1945. In April 1945, the 304th and the 305th Infantry Brigades were attached to the division. These were recently converted anti-aircraft formations. The latter remained with the division for seventeen days, before being sent to the 21st Army Group. The former stayed with the division into May, and then deployed to Norway.

In the final months of 1943 and through June 1944, the division's actual and notional moves were deliberately leaked by double agents as part of the "Fortitude North" segment of the Operation Fortitude deception, the effort to make the Germans believe that the notional 250,000-strong Fourth Army, based in Scotland, would assault Norway. The division was assigned to the fictional II Corps, which was notionally preparing to assault Stavanger. The division participated in this deception effort by maintaining wireless signals suggesting it was moving around the United Kingdom as part of the Fourth Army. The overall ruse of an attack on Norway was maintained through July 1944, the plan officially coming to an end in September. Historian Mary Barbier wrote "the evidence seems to indicate that [Fortitude North] was only partially successful" and "a heated debate has erupted over whether or not [the operation] was a success." (Note: Barbier discussed the opposing arguments. Those in favour of the success of the operation have highlighted that German troop levels in Norway stayed relatively the same, and none were transferred to Normandy. Opponents have pointed out that troops were transferred from Norway, albeit to the Eastern Front. The troop levels in Norway could also have several explanations: the Germans did not realise there was sufficient forces based in Scotland to carry out an invasion, the deception plan played into the German understanding of how important Norway was, and the levels could have remained the same as a way to guard the German northern flank and protect Finnish nickel ore shipments. The former two points have been used to highlight the success of the operation. Detractors have also noted that the Germans were "more interested in radio traffic that originated in the Soviet Union than that from Scotland".)

The division then joined the II Corps's notional move south from Scotland to England, in June 1944, becoming part of "Fortitude South" to convince the Germans that the Normandy landings were a feint and the main Allied invasion would take place in the Pas-de-Calais with a force of 500,000 men. The deception aimed to persuade the Germans not to move the 18 divisions of the 15th Army from the Pas-de-Calais to Normandy. The division also provided the signal and headquarters staff to create the phantom 55th US Infantry Division. In July, the division was reported as an assault division training near Southampton. In September, as the "Fortitude" deception was wound down and the Fourth Army dispersed, it was allowed to be known that the division had reverted to a training role. Historian Gerhard Weinberg wrote that the Germans readily believed in the threat to the Pas de Calais and "it was only at the end of July" that they realised a second assault was not coming, and "by that time, it was too late to move reinforcements". Nevertheless, Barbier concludes "that the importance of the deception has been overrated". (Note: The 15th Army was made up of seven static divisions trained for defensive operations, and supplemented with two Luftwaffe Field Divisions. The army lacked equipment, transport and was under-trained.) The 15th Army was largely immobile, and not combat-ready. Despite the deception, several German divisions, including the 1st SS Panzer Division in reserve behind the 15th Army, were transferred to Normandy. The Germans had realised, as early as May, that the threat to Normandy was real. Barbier concluded that while the Germans believed the deception due to "preconceived ideas about the importance of the Pas De Calais", the Allied staff had overestimated the effectiveness of the deception in causing the inaction of the 15th Army, because they also held a "preconceived notion of what [Operation Fortitude] would accomplish".

The British army demobilised after the war. The TA was reformed in 1947, on a much smaller scale of nine divisions and did not include the 55th (West Lancashire) Infantry Division. (Note: The 16th Airborne Division, the 49th (West Riding) and 56th (London) Armoured Divisions and the 42nd (Lancashire), 43rd (Wessex), 44th (Home Counties), 50th (Northumbrian), 51st/52nd (Scottish), and 53rd (Welsh) Infantry Divisions.) In 1947, the division's insignia was temporarily adopted by the 87th Army Group Royal Artillery, but was replaced at some point before the unit was disbanded in 1955. This formation was based in Liverpool and was made up primarily of units from the West Lancashire area, creating a connection with the division.

== Order of battle ==
55th (West Lancashire) Division (January 1937)

164th (North Lancashire) Infantry Brigade

- 4th Battalion, South Lancashire Regiment
- 5th Battalion, South Lancashire Regiment
- 4th Battalion, Loyal North Lancashire Regiment
- 5th Battalion, Loyal North Lancashire Regiment

165th (Liverpool) Infantry Brigade

- 5th Battalion, King's Regiment (Liverpool)
- 7th Battalion, King's Regiment (Liverpool)
- 10th Battalion, King's Regiment (Liverpool)
- 4th/5th Battalion, Cheshire Regiment

166th (South Lancashire and Cheshire) Infantry Brigade

- 7th Battalion, Cheshire Regiment
- 5th Battalion, South Staffordshire Regiment
- 6th Battalion, South Staffordshire Regiment
- 6th Battalion, North Staffordshire Regiment

Divisional Troops

- 55th (West Lancashire) Divisional Royal Artillery (61st Field Brigade and 2 batteries of the 62nd Field Brigade attached)
  - 87th Field Brigade
  - 88th Field Brigade
  - 89th Field Brigade
- Royal Engineers (46th Divisional Royal Engineers attached)
  - Headquarters, 55th Divisional Royal Engineers
- 55th Divisional Signals, Royal Corps of Signals
- Royal Army Service Corps (46th Divisional Royal Army Service Corps attached)
  - Headquarters, 55th Divisional Royal Army Service Corps
- 164th Field Ambulance, Royal Army Medical Corps
- Royal Army Ordnance Corps
  - 55th Divisional Royal Army Ordnance Corps

55th (West Lancashire) Motor Division (September 1939 – June 1940)

164th Infantry Brigade

- 9th Battalion, King's Regiment (Liverpool)
- 1/4th Battalion, South Lancashire Regiment
- 2/4th Battalion, South Lancashire Regiment

165th Infantry Brigade

- 5th Battalion, King's Regiment (Liverpool)
- 1st Battalion, Liverpool Scottish, (Queen's Own Cameron Highlanders)
- 2nd Battalion, Liverpool Scottish, (Queen's Own Cameron Highlanders)

Divisional Troops

- 55th (West Lancashire) Divisional artillery, Royal Artillery
  - 87th (1st West Lancashire) Field Regiment
  - 136th Field Regiment
  - 66th Anti-Tank Regiment (left 17 November 1939)
- 55th (West Lancashire) Divisional engineers, Royal Engineers
  - 509th Field Company (until 10 January 1940)
  - 510th Field Company (until 1 March 1940)
  - 557th Field Company (from 27 December 1939)
  - 558th Field Company (from 27 December 1939)
  - 511th Field Park Company (left 30 December 1939)
  - 559th Field Park Company (joined 27 December 1939)
- 55th (West Lancashire) Divisional Signals, Royal Corps of Signals
- 5th Battalion, Loyal Regiment (North Lancashire) (motorcycle battalion)

55th (West Lancashire) Infantry Division (June 1940 onwards)

164th Infantry Brigade (until 17 June 1945)

- 9th Battalion, King's Regiment (Liverpool) (until 17 September 1942)
- 1/4th Battalion, South Lancashire Regiment (until 23 July 1944)
- 2/4th Battalion, South Lancashire Regiment (until 8 September 1942)
- 164th Infantry Brigade Anti-Tank Company (from 14 September 1940, until 8 July 1941)
- 17th Battalion, Durham Light Infantry (from 10 September 1942, until 25 September 1943)
- 10th Battalion, Green Howards (from 20 September 1942, until 18 May 1943)
- 9th Battalion, South Lancashire Regiment (from 13 August 1943, until 12 July 1944)
- 9th Battalion, Buffs (Royal East Kent Regiment) (from 29 September 1943, until 25 July 1944)
- 4th Battalion, Devonshire Regiment (from 1 August 1944)
- 5th Battalion, Somerset Light Infantry (from 1 August 1944)
- 1st Battalion, Duke of Cornwall's Light Infantry (from 1 August 1944)

165th Infantry Brigade

- 5th Battalion, King's Regiment (Liverpool) (until 16 April 1943)
- 1st Battalion, Liverpool Scottish, (Queen's Own Cameron Highlanders) (until 13 July 1944)
- 2nd Battalion, Liverpool Scottish, (Queen's Own Cameron Highlanders) (until 13 September 1942)
- 165th Infantry Brigade Anti-Tank Company (from 14 September 1940, until 26 December 1941)
- 10th Battalion, Duke of Wellington's Regiment (from 13 September 1942, until 31 July 1944)
- 9th Battalion, King's Regiment (Liverpool) (from 12 April 1943, until 12 July 1944)
- 4th Battalion, Black Watch (Royal Highland Regiment) (from 26 July 1944)
- 2nd Battalion, Royal Irish Fusiliers (from 26 July 1944)
- 5th Battalion, West Yorkshire Regiment (from 28 August 1944)

199th Infantry Brigade (renamed 166th Infantry Brigade on 15 August 1944)

- 2/8th Battalion, Lancashire Fusiliers (left 23 July 1944)
- 6th Battalion, Manchester Regiment (left 27 May 1942)
- 7th Battalion, Manchester Regiment (left 31 October 1942)
- 199th Infantry Brigade Anti-Tank Company (until 26 December 1941)
- 1st Battalion, Manchester Regiment (from 28 May, until 15 September 1942)
- 2nd Battalion, Loyal Regiment (North Lancashire) (from 16 September 1942, until 16 October 1944)
- 5th Battalion, Royal Inniskilling Fusiliers (from 11 October 1942, until 1 January 1943)
- 11th Battalion, South Staffordshire Regiment (from 29 December 1942, until 15 October 1943)
- 9th Battalion, Bedfordshire and Hertfordshire Regiment (from 16 October 1943, until 13 July 1944)
- 1st Battalion, Liverpool Scottish (Queen's Own Cameron Highlanders) (from 14 July 1944)
- 1/4th Battalion, South Lancashire Regiment (from 24 July 1944)
- 8th Battalion, Manchester Regiment (from 28 November 1944)

Divisional Troops

- 55th (West Lancashire) Divisional artillery, Royal Artillery
  - 87th (1st West Lancashire) Field Regiment(left 30 November 1941)
  - 136th Field Regiment(left 22 August 1942)
  - 109th (Westmorland and Cumberland Yeomanry) Field Regiment (from 1 July 1940)
  - 174th Field Regiment (from 25 July 1942, until 7 March 1943)
  - 192nd Field Regiment (from 23 February, until 20 December 1943)
  - 170th Field Regiment (from 22 May 1943, until 15 March 1944)
  - 5th Field Regiment (from 1 August 1944, until 27 June 1945, when it became 5th Light Regiment)
  - 141st (Queen's Own Dorset Yeomanry) Field Regiment (from 1 August 1944, until 11 June 1945)
  - 124th Field Regiment (from 14 June 1945)
  - 66th Anti-Tank Regiment (from 1 July 1940, until 24 July 1944)
  - 89th (Liverpool Scottish) Anti-Tank Regiment (from 21 October 1944, until 29 August 1945)
  - 103rd Light Anti-Aircraft Regiment (from 4 February, until 30 November 1942)
  - 149th (Sherwood Foresters) Light Anti-Aircraft Regiment (from 31 August, until 23 December 1943)
  - 150th (Loyals) Light Anti-Aircraft Regiment (from 1 August 1944, until 24 February 1945)
- 55th (West Lancashire) Divisional Engineers, Royal Engineers
  - 557th Field Company (became 557th Assault Squadron in 42nd Assault Regiment 4 October 1943)
  - 558th Field Company (joined IX Corps Troops RE 7 December 1941)
  - 55th Field Company (from 18 July 1940, until 22 January 1943)
  - 613th Field Company (from 28 January 1943, until 7 July 1944)
  - 61st Field Company (from 30 October 1943, until 7 July 1944)
  - 259th Field Company (from 1 August 1944, until 22 August 1944, rejoined 15 August 1945)
  - 283rd Field Company (from 25 August 1944)
  - 205th (Wessex) Field Company (from 1 August 1944)
  - 599th Field Park Company (until 7 December 1941)
  - 108th Field Park Company (from 30 August 1944)
  - 9th Bridging Platoon (from 30 August 1944)
  - Divisional Field Stores Section (from December 1942, until 20 July 1944)
- 55th (West Lancashire) Divisional Signals, Royal Corps of Signals
- Divisional reconnaissance (Note: In June 1942, the Reconnaissance Corps universally adopted cavalry nomenclature. As a result, all companies were redesignated as squadrons.)
  - 55th Independent Company, Reconnaissance Corps (from 27 December 1941; re-designated on 6 June 1942 as the 55th Independent Squadron, left 29 October 1943)
  - 161st Regiment, Reconnaissance Corps (from 23 December 1943; renamed 161st Reconnaissance Regiment, Royal Armoured Corps 1 January 1944, left 24 July 1944)
  - 1st Royal Gloucestershire Hussars (from 2 August 1944, until left 15 June 1945)
- 5th Battalion, Manchester Regiment (Machine Gun Battalion) (from 22 October 1944)

== See also ==
- Altcar Training Camp, a training facility that was used by the division.
- British Army Order of Battle (September 1939)
- Everton Road drill hall
- List of commanders of the British 55th Division
- List of British divisions in World War II
