= Gurdaspur District (British Punjab) =

District of British India

- District of British India
- 1849–1947
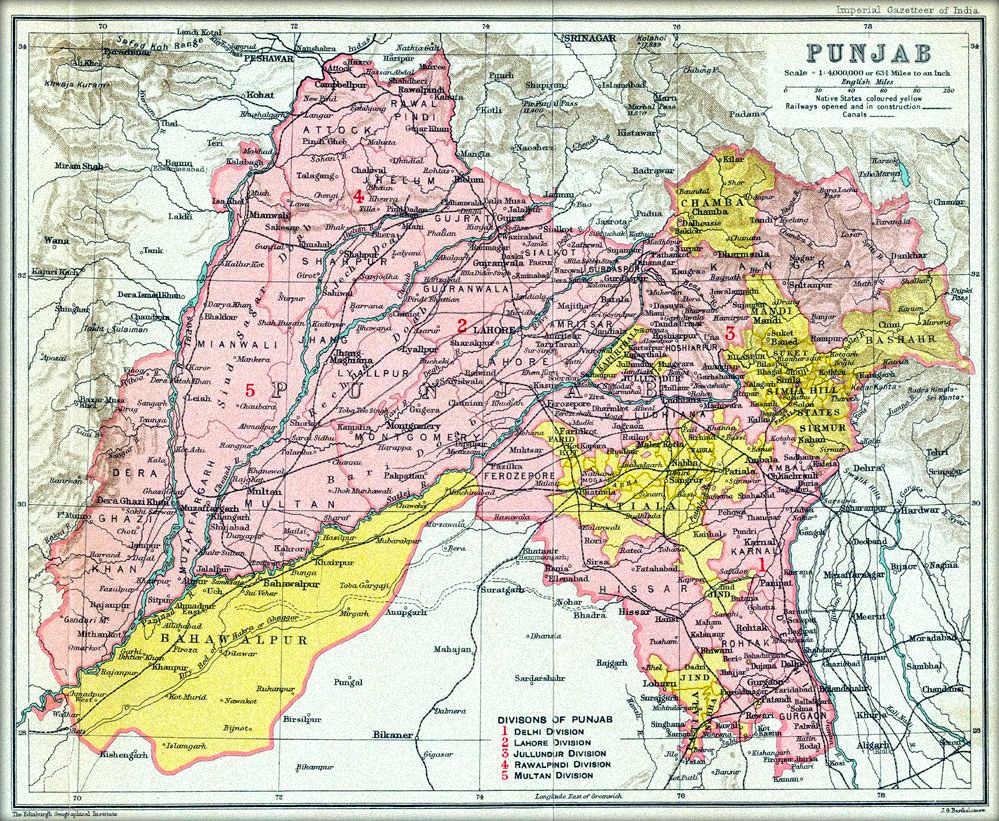
- Maps of the Punjab Province
- Capital: Gurdaspur
- History
  - Second Anglo-Sikh War: 29 March 1849
  - Partition of India: 14–15 August 1947
- Political subdivisions: Gurdaspur Tehsil; Batala Tehsil; Shakargarh Tehsil; Pathankot Tehsil
Preceded by	Succeeded by
1849: Sikh Empire	1947: Gurdaspur district; Shakargarh Tehsil
- Today part of: India; Pakistan

Gurdaspur District was a district in the Lahore Division of the Punjab Province of British India with its headquarters at Gurdaspur. It lay between 31°35' and 32°30′ N. and 74° 52′ and 75° 56′ E., with an area of 1,889 square miles(4892 sq. km). It was bounded north by the Jammu province of Kashmir; on the west by Sialkot District; on the south-west by Amritsar District; on the south-east and east by the Beas River, which separated it from the Kapurthala State and Hoshiarpur District, and also by Kangra District; and on the north-east by the Chamba State.

== Geography ==
The District occupied the flat-land area of the Bari Doab, together with a triangular wedge of territory west of the Ravi River. It included the hill stations of Dalhousie and Bakloh, two isolated pieces of hill territory acquired from the Chamba State, together with a strip of territory on which the cart road ran connecting these outlying stations with the main body of the district. The Pathankot Tehsil (tehsil means subdistrict) comprised 130 miles of hilly country between the Ravi and the Chakki torrent, which divided it from Kangra District.

West of the Ravi is a small tract between that river and the Jammu hills, watered by numerous flowing streams and of great fertility; but the rest of the District west of the Ravi was, with the exception of the riverain strips, an arid expanse of rolling downs intersected by sandy torrent beds. The Chakki River (a tributary of river Beas River), formed the eastern border of the Pathankot Tehsil, - the Beas river then formed the boundary separating Gurdaspur from Hoshiarpur District on the east. On the west, the Ravi River formed the border between Gurdaspur and the Jammu State for about 25 miles and then further south formed the boundary between Sialkot and Amritsar Districts.

== History ==
The chief historical importance of the district lay in its connexion with the rise of the Sikhs. Dera Baba Nanak on the Ravi was named after the founder of Sikhism, who died in 1538 on the opposite bank. Both Guru Amar Das and Guru Har Rai were also connected with the district. In 1710 the Sikh leader Banda captured Batala and Kalanaur, and made the district the headquarters of his raids on the neighbourhood. Driven into the hills by Bahadur Shah in 1711, he returned and built a fort at Lohgarh, identified with the modern Gurdaspur, and defeated Islam Jang, viceroy of Lahore. In 1713 Abdus Samad Khan drove him back to the hills, and, though he again returned and recaptured Kalanaur, finally took him prisoner at Lohgarh in 1716.

The next period in the history of the District is closely connected with Adina Beg Khan. At first governor of Bahrampur and subsequently of the Jalandhar Doab, he founded Dinanagar in 1730, which he seems generally to have made his headquarters. This ruler is chiefly remarkable for the astuteness with which he played off Ahmad Shah, the Mughal emperors, and the Marathas, one against the other, until he was installed by the last-named power as governor of Lahore with head-quarters at Batala. His death in 1758 removed the main obstacle to the spread of the Sikh power, which was only temporarily checked by their defeat at Barnala in 1762.

The Sikh Ramgarhia confederacy, under the famous Jassa Singh, then occupied Batala, Dinanagar, Kalanaur, Sri Hargobindpur, and other places, the rest of the Bari Doab south of Dinanagar falling into the hands of the Kanhaiyas, while west of the Ravi River the Bhangi confederacy rose to power. The rival confederacies soon fell out, and a struggle for supremacy ensued between the Ramgarhias and Kanhaiyas; the Bhangis, who supported the former, lost their power in these parts in 1774, and Jassa Singh himself was expelled by the Kanhaiyas. He returned in 1783, but again lost Batala to the Kanhaiyas in 1786; and two years after his death, in 1806, all the remaining possessions of the Ramgarhia confederacy were annexed by Ranjit Singh. The Kanhaiya estates were confiscated in 1811, and later on Batala and its dependencies were assigned to Sher Singh, a putative son of Ranjit Singh by his Kanhaiya wife, Mehtab Kaur. Dinanagar was a favourite resort of Ranjit Singh, and it was there that in 1838 he received the Macnaghten mission which negotiated the proposed alliance for placing Shah Shuja on the throne of Kabul.

Pathankot and a few neighbouring villages in the plains, together with all the hilly portion of the district, formed part of the country ceded by the Sikhs to the British after the First Anglo-Sikh War in 1846. Under the original distribution of the new territory they were attached to Kangra; but after the final annexation in 1849, the upper portion of the Bari Doab became a separate district, with its head-quarters at Batala. In 1852 the headquarters were moved to Gurdaspur, and in 1853 the district received was expanded gaining the Shakargarh tahsil from Sialkot District. After the 1947 Partition of India, Gurdaspur would lose this Shakargarh subdivision as the district was split between India and Pakistan.

During the Indian Rebellion of 1857 no outbreak took place in the district, in spite of the large number of Indians then employed on canal works. In 1853 the site for the new sanitarium of Dalhousie, together with the strip of hill road connecting it with the plains, was purchased by the British government from Chamba State and in 1862 the further transfer of hill country between the Ravi and the Chakki rivers brought the district into its final shape before partition.

== Demography ==
Gurdaspur contained 11 towns and 2,244 villages in 1901, its population at the last three enumerations were:

- (1881) 823,695
- (1891) 943,922
- (1901) 940,334.

The fall in the decade to 1901 was largely due to emigration, some 44,000 settlers leaving the district for the Chenab Colony, that year the population was distributed between the tehsils (subdistricts) as follows:

Tahsil	Area (Sq mi)	Towns	Villages	Population	Population per sq mi	% Change since 1891	People who were literate
Gurdaspur	496	3	668	238,379	520.9	+ 2.5	7,478
Shakargarh	485	..	703	234,465	483.4	-6.3	4,789
Pathankot	367	5	395	141,623	385.9	+0.5	5,250
Batala	476	3	478	305,867	642.6	+1.7	9,262
District total	1,889	11	2,244	940,334	497.8	+0.4	26,779

Muslims numbered 463,371, or over 49 per cent of the total population; Hindus, 380,636, or over 40 per cent.; and Sikhs, 91,756, or 10 per cent. Mirza Ghulam Ahmad of Qadian, who claimed to be the Mahdi and the Messiah, founded a sect known as the Ahmadiyyas. The district contained several important Sikh shrines, especially at Dera Baba Nanak, and a large number of Hindu and Sikh religious houses. The density of the population was high. The language of the District was chiefly Punjabi, but a good deal of Dogri was spoken on the Jammu border.

Religious groups in Gurdaspur District (British Punjab province era)
Religious group	1881		1891		1901		1911		1921		1931		1941	
Religious group	Pop.	%	Pop.	%	Pop.	%	Pop.	%	Pop.	%	Pop.	%	Pop.	%
Islam	391,400	47.52%	459,039	48.63%	463,371	49.28%	408,216	48.78%	422,877	49.62%	493,216	50.8%	589,923	51.14%
Hinduism (Note: 1931-1941: Including Ad-Dharmis)	359,329	43.62%	396,582	42.01%	380,636	40.48%	284,017	33.94%	258,823	30.37%	255,949	26.36%	290,774	25.21%
Sikhism	72,395	8.79%	85,837	9.09%	91,756	9.76%	121,078	14.47%	137,625	16.15%	178,471	18.38%	221,261	19.18%
Christianity	463	0.06%	2,400	0.25%	4,471	0.48%	23,365	2.79%	32,832	3.85%	43,243	4.45%	51,522	4.47%
Jainism	108	0.01%	64	0.01%	72	0.01%	73	0.01%	20	0%	15	0%	25	0%
Zoroastrianism	0	0%	0	0%	28	0%	22	0%	12	0%	2	0%	6	0%
Buddhism	0	0%	0	0%	0	0%	0	0%	3	0%	2	0%	0	0%
Judaism	—N/a	—N/a	0	0%	0	0%	0	0%	0	0%	0	0%	0	0%
Others	0	0%	0	0%	0	0%	0	0%	0	0%	0	0%	0	0%
Total population	823,695	100%	943,922	100%	940,334	100%	836,771	100%	852,192	100%	970,898	100%	1,153,511	100%

Religion in the Tehsils of Gurdaspur District (1941)
Tehsil	Hinduism		Islam		Sikhism		Christianity		Jainism		Others (Note: Including Anglo-Indian Christians, British Christians, Buddhism, Zoroastrianism, Judaism, Tribals, others, or not stated)		Total	
Tehsil	Pop.	%	Pop.	%	Pop.	%	Pop.	%	Pop.	%	Pop.	%	Pop.	%
Gurdaspur Tehsil	57,281	17.42%	171,498	52.16%	76,695	23.32%	22,506	6.84%	22	0.01%	817	0.25%	328,819	100%
Batala Tehsil	33,610	8.84%	209,277	55.07%	116,413	30.63%	20,670	5.44%	0	0%	83	0.02%	380,053	100%
Pathankot Tehsil	83,330	54.42%	59,548	38.89%	7,580	4.95%	2,307	1.51%	3	0%	366	0.24%	153,134	100%
Shakargargh Tehsil	116,553	39.98%	149,600	51.32%	20,573	7.06%	4,779	1.64%	0	0%	0	0%	291,505	100%
Note1: British era tehsil borders are not an exact match in the present-day due to various bifurcations to tehsil borders — which since created new tehsils — throughout the historic Punjab Province region during the post-independence era that have taken into account population increases. Note2: Tehsil religious breakdown figures for Christianity only includes local Christians, labeled as "Indian Christians" on census. Does not include Anglo-Indian Christians or British Christians, who were classified under "Other" category.

Religion in the Tehsils of Gurdaspur District (1921)
Tehsil	Hinduism		Islam		Sikhism		Christianity		Jainism		Others (Note: Including Buddhism, Zoroastrianism, Judaism, Tribals, others, or not stated)		Total	
Tehsil	Pop.	%	Pop.	%	Pop.	%	Pop.	%	Pop.	%	Pop.	%	Pop.	%
Gurdaspur Tehsil	46,297	19.77%	122,606	52.36%	48,817	20.85%	16,406	7.01%	20	0.01%	0	0%	234,146	100%
Batala Tehsil	45,129	16.37%	145,672	52.84%	73,212	26.56%	11,682	4.24%	0	0%	0	0%	275,695	100%
Pathankot Tehsil	76,752	59.27%	48,431	37.4%	3,293	2.54%	1,011	0.78%	0	0%	15	0.01%	129,502	100%
Shakargargh Tehsil	90,645	42.59%	106,168	49.88%	12,303	5.78%	3,733	1.75%	0	0%	0	0%	212,849	100%
Note: British era tehsil borders are not an exact match in the present-day due to various bifurcations to tehsil borders — which since created new tehsils — throughout the historic Punjab Province during the post-independence era that have taken into account population increases.

Mother Tongue (MT) statistics from 1931 Census, Gurdaspur District
District	Punjabi		Hindustani		Western Pahadi		Others	
District	Total	MT only	Total	MT only	Total	MT only	Total	MT only
Gurdaspur	98.94%	98.91%	0.34%	0.20%	0.27%	0.11%	0.45%	0.78%

== Administration ==
The district was divided into the four tehsils these were:

- Gurdaspur
- Batala
- Shakargarh
- Pathankot

These were the municipalities of the District (besides the administrative headquarters of the District at Gurdaspur):

- Dalhousie
- Batala
- Dinanagar
- Kalanaur
- Pathankot
- Sujanpur
- Dera Nanak
- Sri Hargobindpur

The district also contained two notified areas:

- Fatehgarh
- Bahrampur

== Missionaries ==
The American United Presbyterian Mission was established in Gurdaspur in 1872, and occupied the Pathankot and Shakargarh tahsils. The Church Missionary Society had an important station at Batala, established in 1878, where it maintained the Baring High School. In 1901, the District contained 4,198 native Christians.

== Transport ==
Opened in 1894, a branch of the North-Western Railway from Amritsar passed through the district, with its terminus at Pathankot, from which a metalled cart-road ran to Dalhousie and another to Palampur in Kangra District, with a branch to Dharamsala. The most important unmetalled roads were the Hoshiarpur-Sialkot road, which passed through Gurdaspur and Sialkot, and the road from Pathankot passing through Gurdaspur to Amritsar. The Hoshiarpur-Sialkot road was split by an international border once India and Pakistan became separate independent states, the total length of metalled roads was 59 miles and of un-metalled roads 608 miles.

== District officials ==
A Deputy-Commissioner ran the district - aided by six Assistant or Extra-Assistant Commissioners, of whom one was a sub-divisional officer in charge of Dalhousie during the summer months, and another in charge of the administration. Each tehsil of the district was under a tehsildar assisted by a naib-tehsildar (deputy tehsildar).

=== Law ===
The Deputy-Commissioner as District Magistrate was responsible for criminal justice. The civil judicial work was under a District Judge, both supervised by the Divisional Judge of the Amritsar Civil Division (also the Sessions Judge). There were five munsifs, one at mead-quarters, two at Batala, and one at each of the other tehsils. There were also Cantonment Magistrates at Dalhousie and Bakloh, and two honorary magistrates. The predominant form of crime was burglary.

==== Police ====
The regular police force consisted of 566 of all ranks, including 5 cantonment and 147 municipal police, in charge of a Superintendent, who usually had 4 inspectors under him. The village watchmen numbered 1,957. There were 18 police stations and 12 outposts. The District Jail at Gurdaspur could accommodate 287 prisoners.

== Education ==
Gurdaspur stood twenty-fourth among the twenty-eight Districts of the Punjab Province in respect of the literacy of its population. In 1901 the proportion of literate persons was 2.8 per cent. (5.1 males and 0.2 females). The number of pupils under instruction was 5,697 in 1880-1, 10,631 in 1890-1, 8,790 in 1900-1, and 8,323 in 1903-4. In 1904, there were 15 secondary and 142 primary (public) schools, and 5 advanced and 58 elementary (private) schools, with 258 girls in the public and 76 in the private schools. The District possessed 3 Anglo-vernacular high schools, one of which contained only Christian boys. It also possessed 2 public schools for girls, the most important of which was the Dalhousie Convent School. The total expenditure on education in 1903-4 was Rs. 92,000, to which Government contributed Rs. 7,000, and local funds Rs. 27,000, while fees brought in Rs. 28,000.

== Health ==
Besides the Gurdaspur civil dispensary, the district had twelve outlying dispensaries, these in 1904 treated a total of 208,766 out-patients and 1,537 in-patients, and 7,268 operations were performed. The income and expenditure were Rs. 30,000, local and municipal funds contributing Rs. 12,000 and Rs. 15,000 respectively. The number of successful vaccinations in 1903-4 was 28,641, representing 30.6 per 1,000 of population, the Vaccination Act was in force at Dalhousie - this was to inoculate children against smallpox.

== Maps ==
Map of Gurdaspur District, surveyed by R. Shortrede, T. C. Blagrave, and J. W. B. Blagrave, 1850–52 (F.5-12)

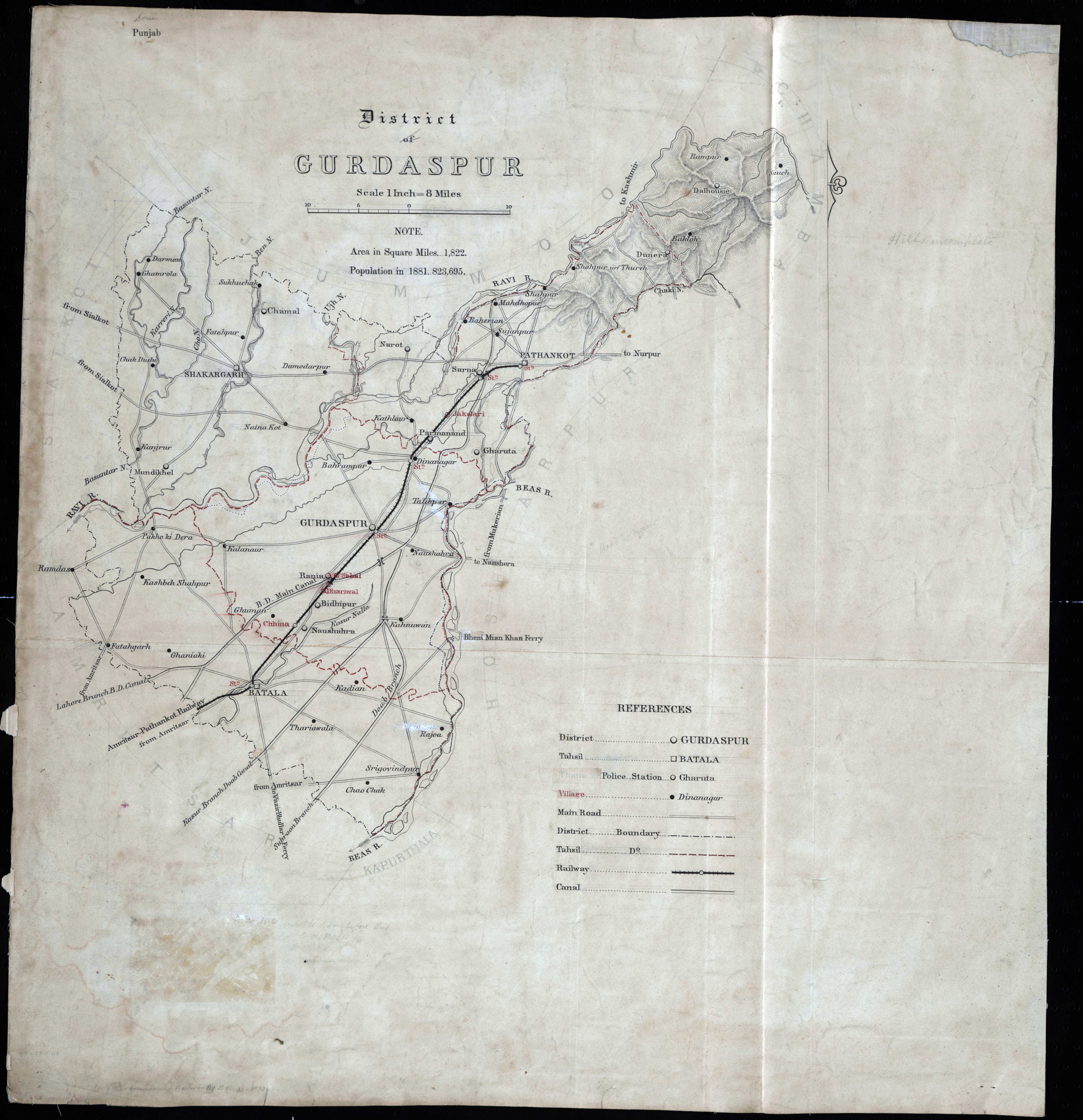
Map of Gurdaspur District, 1881 (F.5-34)

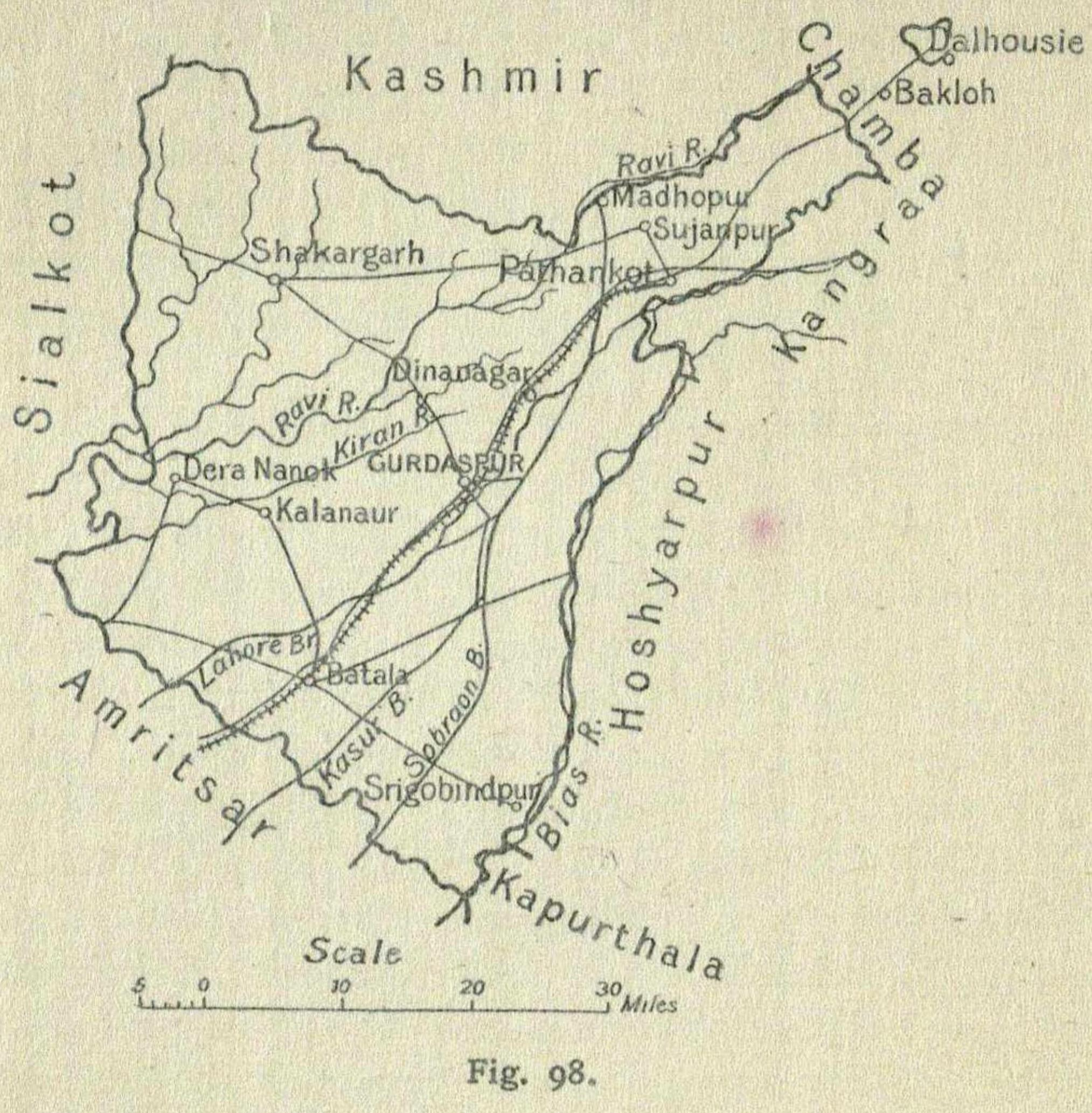
Map of Gurdaspur district of Punjab Province, British India, published in The Panjab, North-West Frontier Province and Kashmir (1916)
