= The Chindits order of battle =

The Order of battle of the Chindits, an Allied special force which carried out two deep penetration raids behind Japanese line during the Burma campaign in the South-East Asian Theatre of World War II

== First Chindit expedition, 1943, codenamed Operation Longcloth ==
Headquarters 77th Indian Infantry Brigade

Commander Brigadier Orde Wingate
Brigade Major Major R.B.G. Bromhead (succeeded by Major G.M. Anderson)
Staff Captain Captain H.J. Lord

Deception party

Officer Commanding (O.C.) Major Jeffries

No. 1 Group (Southern)

Officer Commanding (O.C.) Lieutenant Colonel Leigh Alexander (died during the operation)

1 Column (Major Dunlop)
2 Column (Major Burnett)

No. 2 Group (Northern)

O.C. Lieutenant Colonel S.A. Cooke

3 Column (Major Michael Calvert)
4 Column (Major R.A. Conron)(replaced by Major R.B. Bromhead March 1, 1943)
5 Column (Major Bernard Fergusson)
7 Column (Major K. Gilkes)
8 Column (Major Walter Scott)

HQ Group (Burma Rifles)

O.C. Lt-Colonel L.G. Wheeler 2nd Burma Rifles (replaced by Captain P.C. Buchanan on the death of Lt-Colonel Wheeler)

== Second Chindit expedition, 1944, codenamed Operation Thursday ==
Headquarters 3rd Indian Infantry Division

Division Commander Major-General Orde.C. Wingate (succeeded by Major-General W.D.A. Lentaigne)
Deputy Commander Major-General G.W. Symes (succeeded by Brigadier D. Tulloch)
Brigadier General Staff Brigadier D. Tulloch ( succeeded by Brigadier H.T. Alexander)

Locations of Headquarters

Rear HQ at Gwalior, Central India
Main HQ first at Imphal later at Sylhet, Assam
Launching HQ at Lalaghat
Tactical/Forward HQ, Shaduzup, Burma

Thunder 3rd West African Brigade

Officer Commanding (O.C.) Brigadier A.H. Gillmore, (succeeded by Brigadier A.H.G. Ricketts): 10 HQ column
6th Battalion, Nigeria Regiment: 66 and 39 Columns
7th Battalion, Nigeria Regiment: 29 and 35 Columns
12th Battalion, Nigeria Regiment: 12 and 43 Columns
3rd West African Field Ambulance: Support

(From disbanded 70th British Infantry Division );

Javelin British 14th Infantry Brigade

O.C. Brigadier Thomas Brodie: 59 HQ column
2nd Battalion, Black Watch: 42 and 73 Columns - Lt.Col.G.C.Green
1st Battalion, Bedfordshire and Hertfordshire Regiment: 16 and 61 Columns
2nd Battalion, York and Lancaster Regiment: 65 and 84 Columns
7th Battalion, Leicestershire Regiment: 47 and 74 Columns - Lt Col F.R.(Wilf) Wilford; Maj (later Lt Col) F.H.J.Wileman & Maj J.G.Lockett MC (att from Seaforth H.). Maj F.H.J.Wileman later detached to help train Merrill's Marauders in Jungle Warfare.
54th Field Company Royal Engineers & Medical Detachment:support

Enterprise British 16th Infantry Brigade

O.C. Brigadier B.E. Fergusson: 99 HQ column
2nd Battalion, The Queen's Royal Regiment (West Surrey): 21 and 22 Columns
2nd Battalion, Leicestershire Regiment: 17 and 71 Columns
51st/69th Regiment, Royal Artillery: 51 and 69 Columns (infantry columns made up of R.A. personnel)
45th Reconnaissance Regiment: 45 and 54 Columns (infantry columns made up recce units)
2nd Field Company Royal Engineers & Medical Detachment: support

Emphasis 77th Indian Infantry Brigade

O.C. Brigadier Mike Calvert: 25 HQ column
1st Battalion, The King's Regiment (Liverpool): 81 and 82 Columns
1st Battalion, The Lancashire Fusiliers: 20 and 50 Columns
1st Battalion, South Staffordshire Regiment: 38 and 80 Columns
3rd Battalion, 6th Gurkha Rifles: 36 and 63 Columns
3rd Battalion, 9th Gurkha Rifles: 57 and 93 Columns
142 Company, Hong Kong Volunteers & Medical and veterinary detachments: Support

Profound 111th Indian Infantry Brigade

O.C. Brigadier W.D.A. Lentaigne, (succeeded first by Major John Masters and then by Brigadier Morris): 48 HQ Column
1st Battalion, The Cameronians: 26 and 90 Columns
2nd Battalion, The King's Own Royal Regiment (Lancaster): 41 and 46 Columns
3rd Battalion (part), 4th Gurkha Rifles: 30 Column
Mixed Field Company Royal Engineers/Royal Indian Engineers & Medical and veterinary detachments: Support

Morris Force

O.C. Lt-Colonel (later promoted Brigadier) J.R. Morris
4th Battalion, 9th Gurkha Rifles: 49 and 94 Columns
3rd Battalion (part), 4th Gurkha Rifles: 40 Column

Dah Force

O.C. Lieut-Colonel D.C. Herring
Kachin Levies

Bladet (Blain's Detachment)

O.C. Major Blain
Gliderborne commando engineers

Royal Artillery Supporting non-mobile units designed to defend Chindit Jungle Fortresses.

R, S and U Troops 160th Field Regiment Royal Artillery (All 25 pounders)
W, X, Y, and Z Troops 69th Light Anti Aircraft Regiment (40mm Bofors)

Support Units

NO 1 Air Commando USAAF – strike and casualty evacuation (until 1/5/1944 only)
Eastern Air Command – supply
U.S. Army 900th Field Unit (engineers)

Divisional Support Troops

2nd Battalion Burma Rifles – one section assigned per column except for columns in the 3rd West African Brigade
145th Brigade Company R.A.S.C.
219th Field Park Company, Royal Engineers
61st Air Supply Company R.A.S.C.
2nd Indian Air Supply Company, R.I.A.S.C.

Galahad 5307th Composite Unit (Provisional) US Army

1st Battalion; Red and White Combat Teams
2nd Battalion; Blue and Green Combat Teams
3rd Battalion; Khaki and Orange Combat Teams
Also known as Merrill's Marauders. After being trained, the force was transferred to General Joseph Stilwell's Northern Combat Area Command and operated independently of the Chindits.

23rd British Infantry Brigade

O.C. Brigadier Lancelot Perowne: 32 HQ Column
1st Battalion Essex Regiment: 44 and 56 Columns
2nd Battalion Duke of Wellington's Regiment (West Riding): 33 and 76 Columns
4th Battalion Border Regiment: 34 and 55 Columns
60th (North Midland) Field Regiment, Royal Artillery: 60 and 68 Columns (fighting as infantry)
12th Field Company Royal Engineers & Medical Detachment: Support
This Brigade trained as a Chindit Brigade, but was diverted to the main front in Assam and took part in the Battle of Kohima.
