= Punjab Reorganisation Act, 1966 =

Act of the Parliament of India

Punjab Reorganization Act, 1966
- The region before and after reorganisation

Parliament of India
- Long title: An Act to provide for the Reorganisation of the existing State of Punjab and for matters connected therewith.
- Citation: No. 31 of 1966
- Enacted by: Parliament of India
- Enacted: 18 September 1966
- Status: In force

The Punjab Reorganisation Act, 1966 was passed by the Indian Parliament on 18 September 1966, separating territory from the state of Punjab, most of which formed the new state of Haryana. Some of the Punjab state territory was transferred to Himachal Pradesh, then a Union territory; while Chandigarh, the capital of Punjab, was made a temporary Union territory to serve as the provisional capital of both Punjab and Haryana. The larger state of Punjab had been formed under the States Reorganisation Act, 1956 by merging East Punjab and PEPSU. The 1966 separation was the result of the Punjabi Suba movement, which agitated for the creation of a Punjabi-speaking state (the modern state of Punjab); in the process a majority Hindi-speaking state was created (effectively, Haryana).

The territorial changes as a result of the reorganisation of the erstwhile composite Punjab State are listed below :

1. Entire districts of Hisar, Rohtak, Gurgaon, Karnal and Mahendra-garh, complete tahsils of Ambala, Jagadhri, Naraingarh and 153 villages along with Kalka town of Kharar tahsil of Ambala district and two tahsils viz., Jind and Narwana of Sangrur District (44,222.0 kmsq.) were transferred from the composite Punjab for formation of the newly created State of Haryana on 1 November 1966.
2. Entire districts of Kangra, Simla, Lahaul and Spiti, three towns viz. Bakloh(C.B.), Dalhousie(M.C) and Dalhousie Cantt. town (14.3 kmsq.) of Gurdaspur district, complete Nalagarh tahsil of Ambala district and 290 villages along with Una town of the Una tahsil of Hoshiarpur district (27,277.3 kmsq.) were transferred to Himachal Pradesh.
3. 36 villages, Manimajra and Chandigarh towns of Kharar tahsil of Ambala district (114.0 kmsq, were lumped together to come out as a separate administrative unit styled as Union Territory of Chandigarh.
4. Entire districts of Amritsar, Bathinda, kapurthala, Jalandhar, Ludhiana, Firozpur, Patiala and Complete tahsil of Barnala, Malerkotla & Sangrur tahsil of Sangrur district and Gurdaspur district without Bakloh, Dalhousie and Dalhousie Cantt. town, Complete tahsils of Dasuya, Garhshankar, Hoshiarpur, 237 villages with Nangal, Naya Nangal and Anandpur Sahib towns of the Una tahsil of Hoshiarpur district, Entire tahsil of Ropar, 282 villages along with Kharar and Kurali towns Kharar tahsil of composite Ambala district remain in Punjab.

Within the Chandigarh Capitol Complex, the Palace of Justice hosts a sole Punjab and Haryana High Court as the common state supreme court for both states; the Palace of Assembly houses both the Punjab Legislative Assembly and the Haryana Legislative Assembly; and the Secretariat Building hosts the offices of the Chief Secretaries of both states. The state governors' residences, Punjab Raj Bhavan and Haryana Raj Bhavan, are next to each other on Sukhna Lake.
