= HMS Gurkha (G63) =

Royal Navy destroyer

Coordinates: 31°50′N 26°15′E

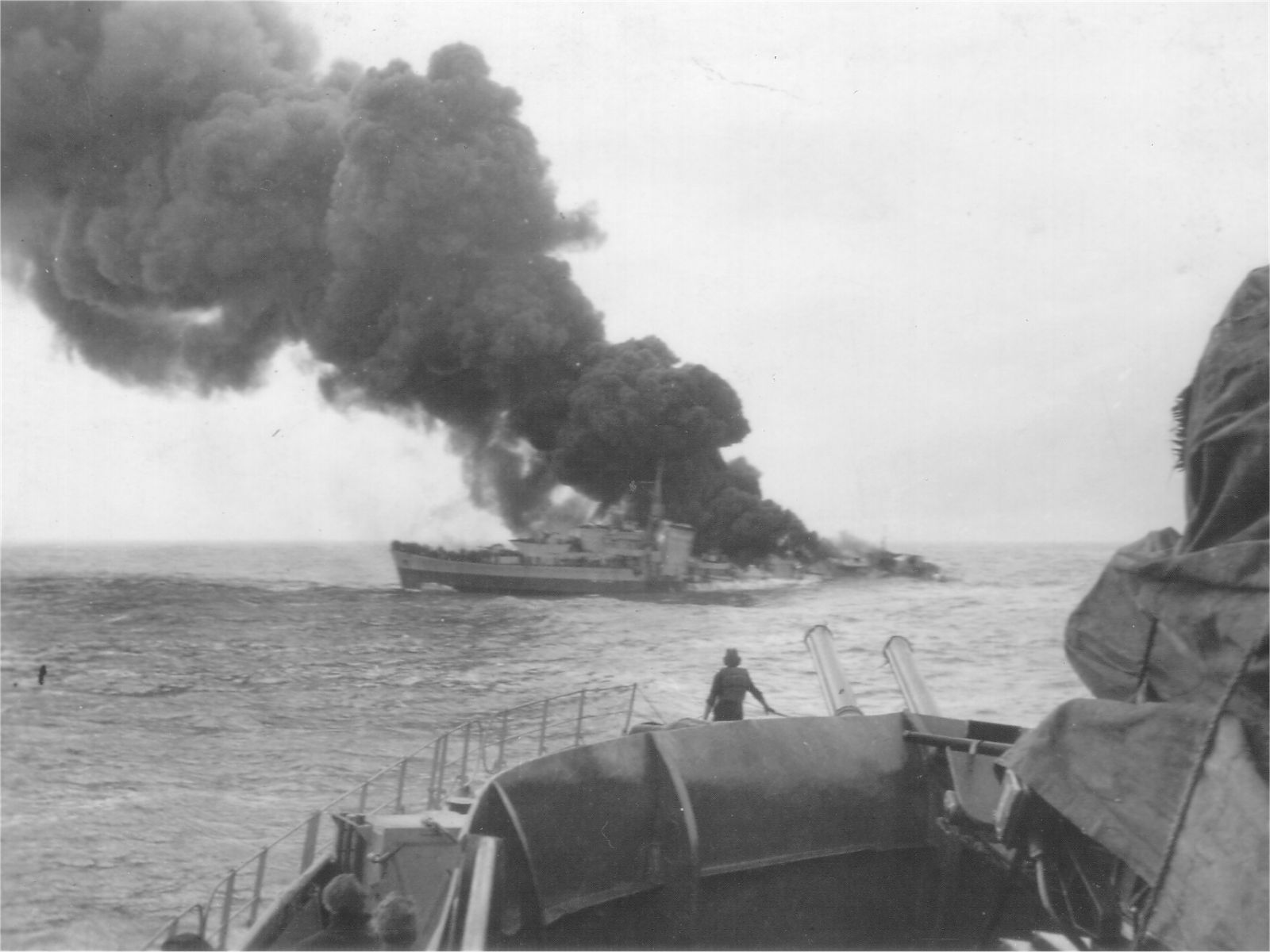
- HMS Gurkha sinking after being torpedoed

History

United Kingdom
- Name: HMS Gurkha
- Namesake: Gurkha
- Ordered: 31 March 1938
- Builder: Cammell Laird & Co Ltd, Birkenhead
- Laid down: 18 October 1938
- Launched: 8 July 1940
- Commissioned: 18 February 1941
- Identification: pennant number: G63
- Fate: Torpedoed and sunk, 17 January 1942

General characteristics
- Type: L-class destroyer
- Displacement: 1,920 long tons (1,950 t) (standard); 2,660 long tons (2,700 t) (deep)
- Length: 362 ft 3 in (110.4 m) o/a
- Beam: 37 ft (11.3 m)
- Draught: 10 ft (3.0 m)
- Installed power: 48,000 shp (36,000 kW)
- Propulsion: 2 × shafts; 2 × Parsons geared steam turbines; 2 × Admiralty 3-drum boilers
- Speed: 36 knots (67 km/h; 41 mph)
- Range: 5,500 nmi (10,200 km; 6,300 mi) at 15 knots (28 km/h; 17 mph)
- Complement: 190
- Sensors & processing systems: ASDIC; Type 285 anti-aircraft (AA) radar
- Armament: 4 × 2 – QF 4-inch Mk XVI dual purpose guns; 1 × 4 – QF 2-pounder Mk VIII anti-aircraft guns; 2 × 1 – QF 20 mm Oerlikon guns; 2 × 2 – QF .5-inch Vickers Mk III anti-aircraft machine guns; 2 × 4 – 21-inch (533 mm) torpedo tubes; 110 × depth charges, 2 rails and 8 throwers

HMS Gurkha was an L-class destroyer in Britain's Royal Navy during World War II. She was originally to be named Larne in line with her class letter. However, after the Tribal-class Gurkha was sunk in April 1940 the officers and men of the Gurkha regiments each subscribed one day's pay to replace her and Larne was renamed before launching.

Her only commanding officer (Commander Charles Nugent Lentaigne) was brother of Joe Lentaigne who was an officer in the 4th (Prince of Wales' Own) Gurkhas.

== Construction and design ==
On 31 March 1938 an order was placed with Cammell Laird for Larne, one of eight L-class destroyers ordered that day and was laid down on 18 October 1938, the first of her class.

In April 1940, the Tribal-class destroyer Gurkha was sunk off Norway, and in June it was decided to rename Larne as Gurkha to continue the relationship between the ship and the Gurkha Regiment. She was launched on 8 July 1940 by Mary Churchill, the youngest child of the Prime Minister and his wife Clementine. Only 17 years old at the time, she later recalled the "emotion and excitement" of the launch, describing the occasion as "thrilling":

"It was a beautiful day and I waved the new vessel away most proudly. It was at that time customary for the shipbuilders to give the sponsor of a ship a present: my 'prize' was a lovely Victorian diamond necklace."

Her parents were not present at the launch, but Soames says that when she got home they were ". . . knocked endways by my diamonds." Even near the end of her life, she remembered the launch as being like a "fairy-tale."

The L class was intended to have a main gun armament of six QF 4.7 inch Mark XI guns in three enclosed twin Mark XX mounts, but delays in production of the new gun mount resulted in the July 1940 decision to complete four of the class, including Gurkha, with a revised main gun armament of eight QF 4-inch (102 mm) Mk XVI naval guns in four twin mounts. Close-in anti-aircraft armament consisted of a single quadruple 2-pounder (40 mm) "pom-pom", two single 20 mm cannon and two quadruple Vickers .50 machine gun mounts. Eight 21-inch (533 mm) torpedo tubes were carried in two quadruple mounts. 110 depth charges were carried.

Gurkha reached a speed of 33.73 knots (62.47 km/h; 38.82 mph) on sea trials and was completed on 18 February 1941.

== Service history ==
On commissioning, Gurkha joined the 11th Escort Group. On 25 March 1941, the steamer Beaverbrae was sunk by German bombers and Gurkha, together with the destroyer Tartar rescued Beaverbrae's crew. While returning to Scapa Flow the next day, Gurkha collided with a wooden drifter, sinking the fishing boat and sustaining serious damage. She was under repair at Rosyth until June 1941.

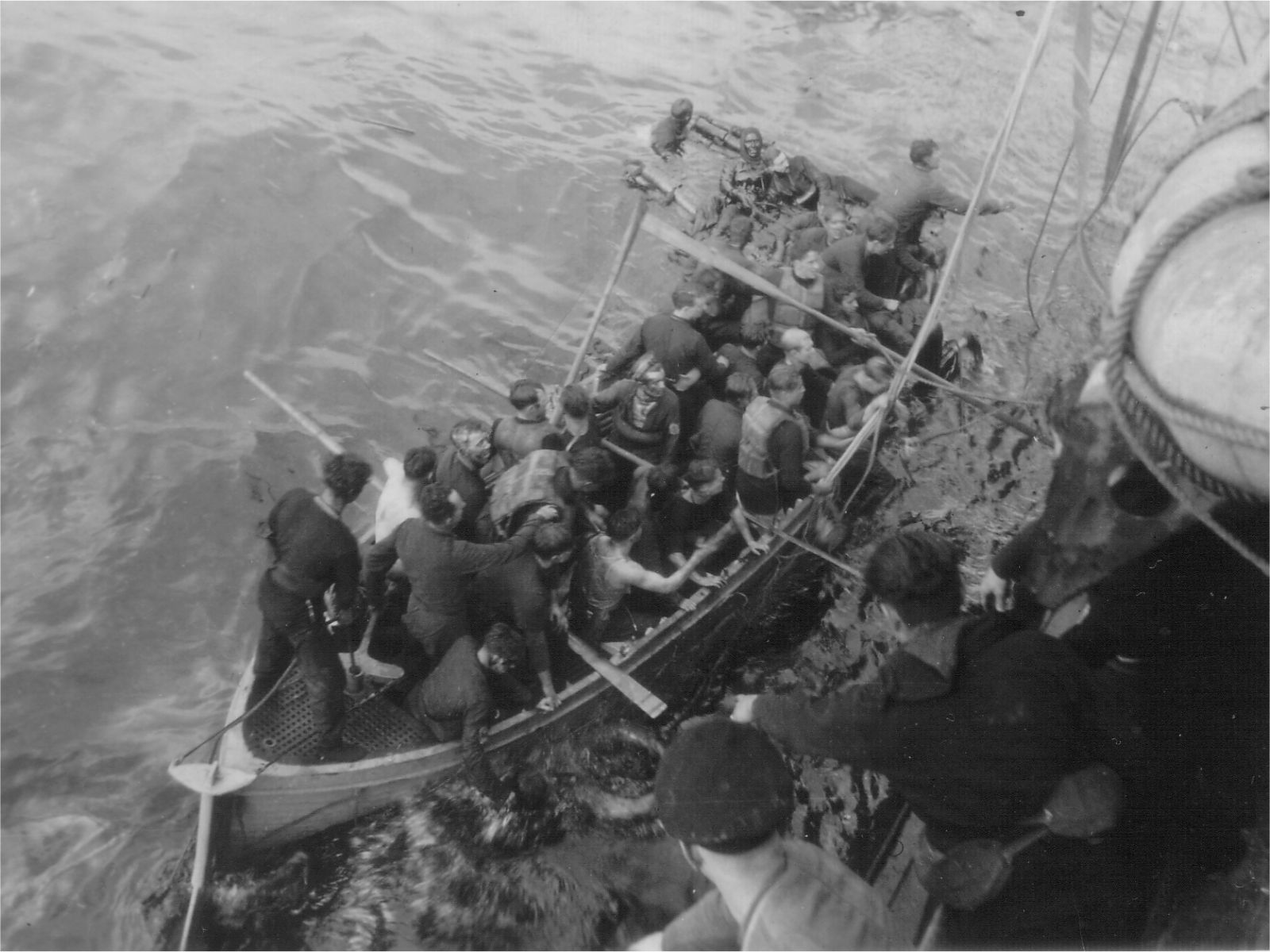
Some of the survivors of HMS Gurkha arriving at the Dutch destroyer Isaac Sweers.

Following repair, Gurkha was deployed on convoy escort duties in the Western Approaches. She guarded Malta Convoys (1941), destroyed the Italian submarine Adua, and guarded United Kingdom to Gibraltar convoys.

She was torpedoed by U-133 off Sidi Barrani on 17 January 1942 and sank after 90 minutes. The surviving crew members were saved by the Dutch destroyer Isaac Sweers.
