= 4th Gorkha Rifles =

Infantry regiment of the Indian Army

- Regimental insignia
- Active: Aug 1857–present
- Country: British India 1857–1947; India 1947–Present
- Branch: British Indian Army 1857–1947; Indian Army 1947–Present
- Type: Rifles
- Role: Light Infantry
- Size: Five battalions
- Regimental Centre 14 GTC Subathu Simla Hills (HP): Bakloh, Dharamshala, Chakrata. Presently, Subathu, Himachal Pradesh
- Nicknames: 4 GR: 1/4 GRJethi, 2/4 GrMahili, 3/4 GRSahili. 4/4 GrKahili &5/4 GR Kanchhi Paltan
- Motto: "Kafar Hunu Bhanda Marnu Ramro (Better to die than live like a coward)
- Colors: Rifle Green; faced black and Red
- March: 'Barde Jaun' (Onwards.. Advance.. Sons of Balla Bhadra); War Cray "Ayo Gorkhali" (Hail, Goddess Kali, The Gorkhas are here)
- Anniversaries: Regimental Day (11 March) 08-11 Mar 1917Baghdad Victory in Iraq
- Decorations: 1858–1946:Victoria Cross1, Commander of the Most Excellent Order of the British Empire 1, Distinguished Service Order 10, Order of the British Empire 1, Bar to DSO 1, Military Cross 24, 1 Bar to MC, 1 MBE, 1 French Legion of Honour, 96 Mention in Despatches, 9 Order of British India, 15 Indian Order of Merit, 6 IDM, 42 Indian Distinguished Service Medal, 1 Croix De Guerre, 11 Médaille militaire, 1 Bronze Medal for Military Valour, 1 Medal of Saint George, 2 Star of Nepal 1947–present 3 Param Vishisht Seva Medal, 3 Maha Vir Chakra, 1 Kirti Chakra, 3 Ati Vishishtha Seva Medal, 5 Vir Chakra, 2 Shaurya Chakra, 1 Yudh Seva Medal, 24 Sena Medals, 6 Vishisht Seva Medals, 9 Mention in Dispatches, 40 Commendation Cards.
- Battle honours: 1866–1914:Ali Masjid, Kabul 1879 and Kandahar 1880, Afghanistan 1878–80, Chitral Campaign, Waziristan Campaign 1895, Tirah Campaign, Punjab Frontier, Boxer Rebellion, China 1900 World War I: Givenchy 1914, Neuve Chapelle, Ypres 1915, St. Julien, Aubers, Festubert (1915), France and Flanders 1914–15, Gallipoli 1915, Egypt 1916, Tigris 1916, Battle of Kut 1917, Baghdad Mesopotamia 1916–18, N.W. Frontier India 1917, Baluchistan 1918. 1919–39: Afghanistan 1919. World War II Iraq 1941, Syria 1941, The Cauldron, North Africa 1940–43, Trestina, Monte Cedrone, Italy 1943–45 Burma 1942–45, Pegu 1942, Chindits 1944, Bishenpur, Shwebo, Mandalay. 1947–present: Punch, Gurais and Bilafond La Theatre Honours: Punjab 1965, Jammu and Kashmir 1971

Commanders
- Colonel of the Regiment: Lt General Balbir Singh
- Notable commanders: khukuri IV & Ashoke ' Change 1988

Insignia
- Regimental Insignia: A pair of crossed Khukris with the Roman numeral IV below, and Ashoka on top.
- Tartan: Government (1st Bn pipers plaids and pipe bags); Mackenzie HLI (2nd Bn pipers plaids and pipe bags)

The 4th Gorkha Rifles or the Fourth Gorkha Rifles, abbreviated as 4 GR, is an infantry regiment of the Indian Army comprising Gurkha soldiers of Indian Gorkha or Nepalese nationality, especially Magars and Gurungs hill tribes of Nepal. The Fourth Gorkha Rifles has five infantry battalions. The regiment was raised in 1857 as part of the British Indian Army. In 1947, after India's independence, the Fourth Gurkha Rifles became part of the Indian Army as the Fourth Gorkha Rifles.

The regiment has seen action in wars in Africa, Europe and Asia, including the Second Afghan War, the Boxer Rebellion (China), World War I, and World War II. Since Independence, in 1947, the regiment has seen action in the India-Pakistan Wars of 1947–48, 1965, 1971, 1987, and 1999, and the Chinese aggression in 1962. The regiment has also participated in UN peace-keeping missions.

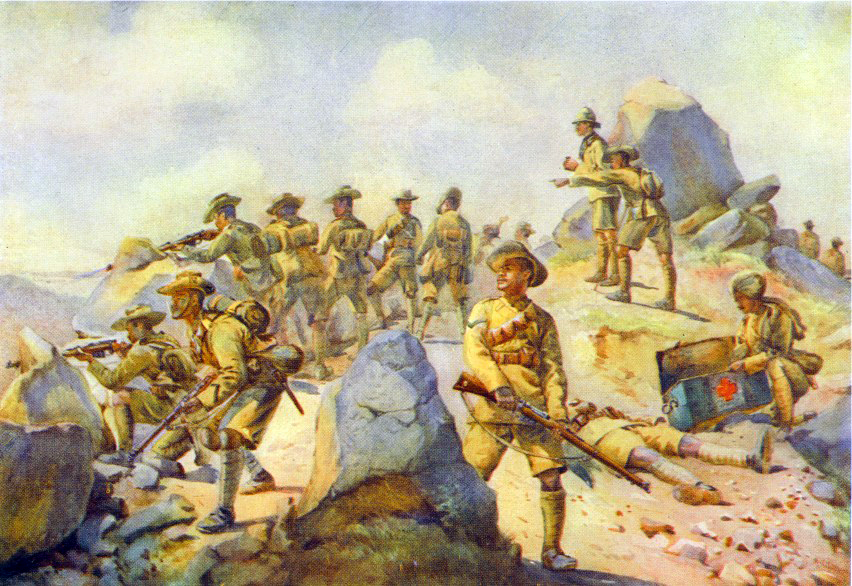
4th Gurkha Rifles 'Rearguard Action', by A.C. Lovett (1909)

== History ==
4th Prince of Wales' Own (PWO) Gurkha Rifles insignia

4th Gorkha Rifles insignia

In the wake of the 1857 rebellion, an Extra Goorkha Regiment, was raised later that year as part of the East Indian Company Army, and was briefly known as 19th Regiment of Bengal Native Infantry. Following the decision in 1861, to number the Goorkha Regiments sequentially, in order of raising, the regiment was designated as the 4th Goorkha Regiment. In 1924, the regiment was honored with a Royal connection and redesignated as the 4th Prince of Wales' Own (PWO) Gurkha Rifles and Edward Albert, the Prince of Wales, later the lovelorn King Edward VIII, was appointed as Colonel-in-Chief. In 1950, after India become a republic, the appellation PWO was discarded.

In 1866, Bakloh was acquired as Goorkha Cantonment for the 4th Goorkha Regiment and Balun, Dalhousie Cantonment, as cantonment for British troops, along with a sliver of territory to connect the two cantonments, from the Raja of Chamba for a sum of Rupees 5000. Bakloh, a hill station, remained the home, and the Regimental Center and Depot, of the 4th Gurkha Rifles, for 82 years, from 1866 to 1948.

=== 1857–1914 ===
Between 1857 and 1914, the regiment saw action in small wars, in India's North East, in the Lushai Hills, present day Mizoram, and along India's North-West Frontier, including during the Second Afghan War. In 1900 the Regiment formed part of the Expeditionary Force deployed to China in response to the Boxer Rebellion.

In 1903, in Somalia, during the Third Somaliland Campaign, Captain William George Walker, a Regimental officer, on deputation with Somali Camel Corps, became the first person from the regiment to be awarded the Victoria Cross, for risking his life to save the life of another officer.

=== World War I ===
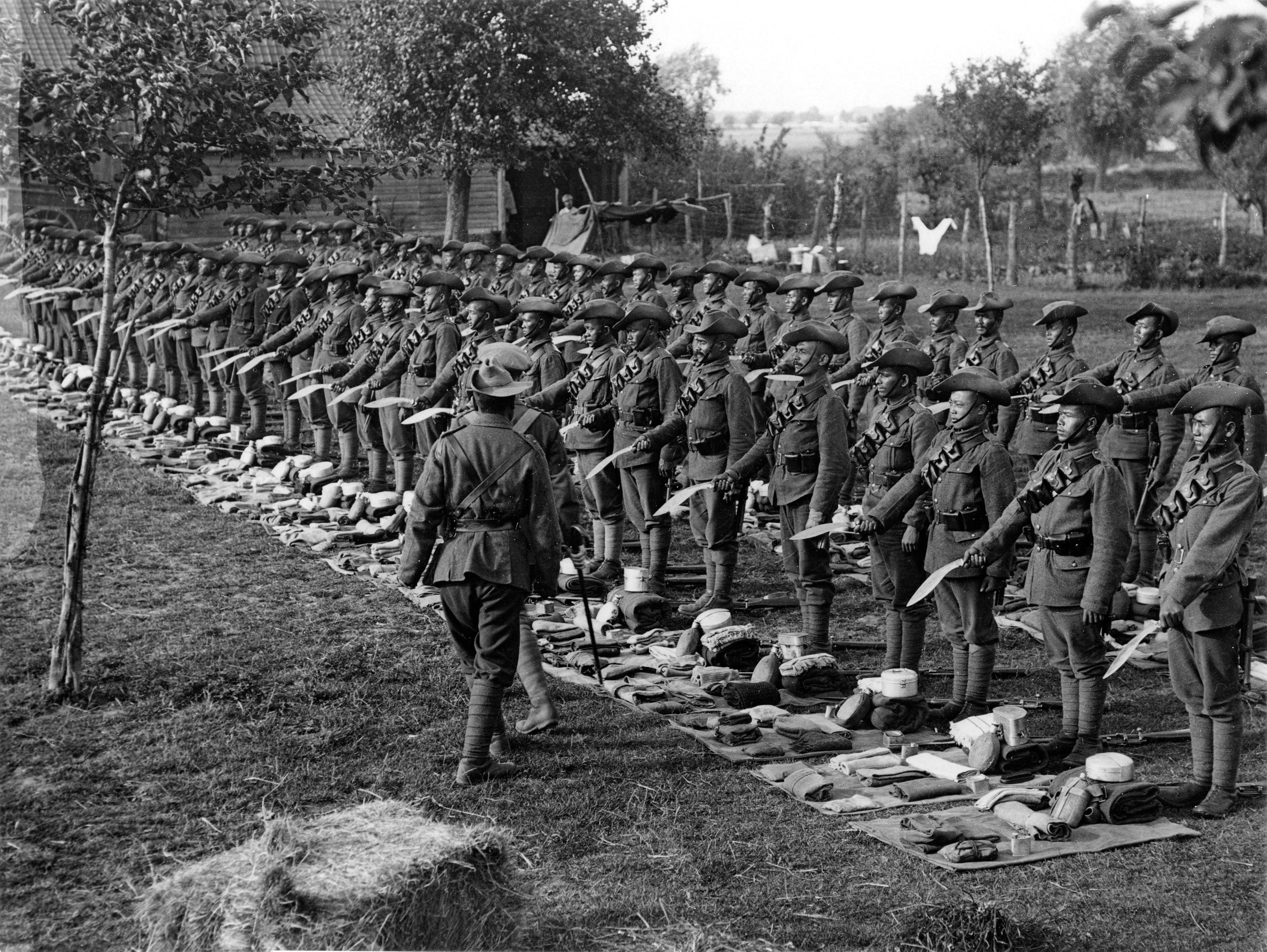
World War I: 1/4th GR at kit and kukris inspection, 24 Jul 1915, in France.

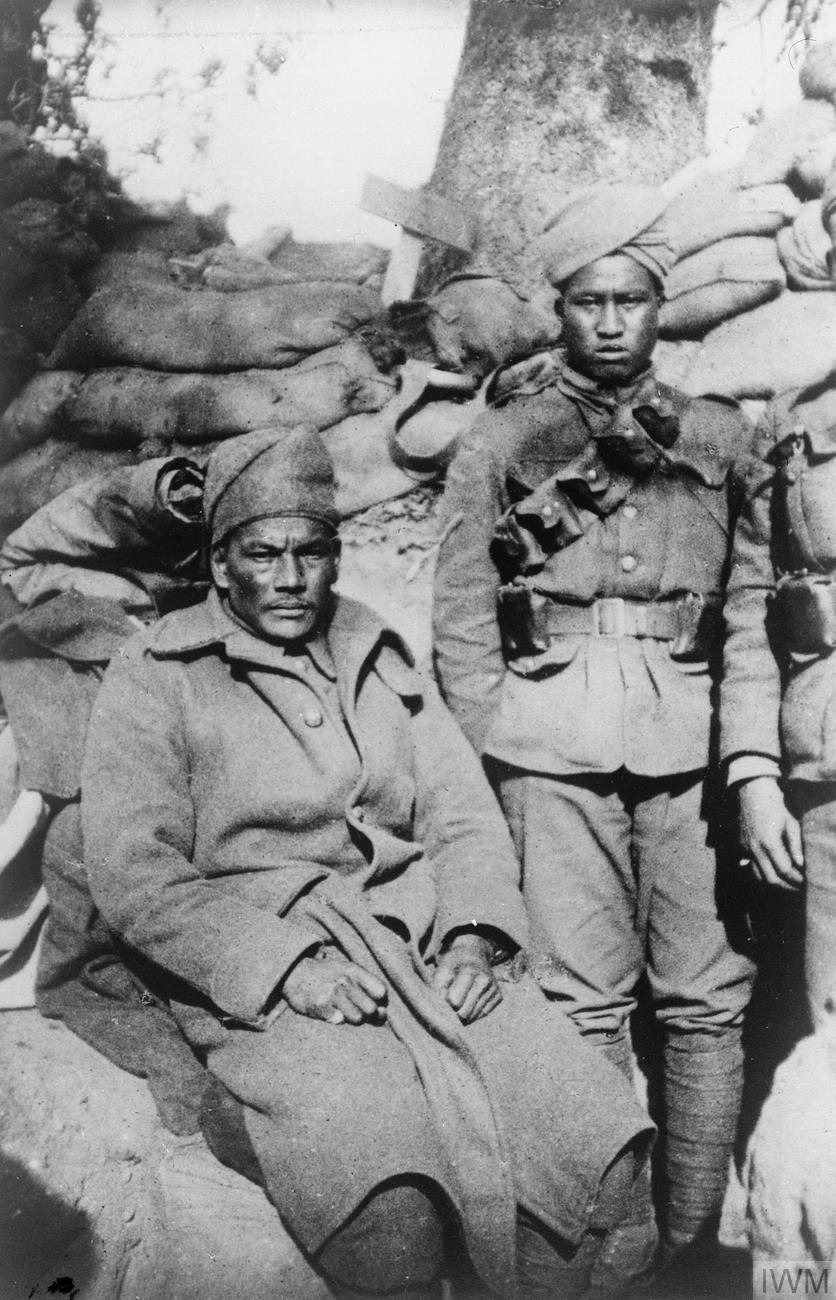
Two soldiers of the 1/4th GR in a trench at Gallipoli, 1915

Soon after the start of World War I, the 1st Battalion 4th Gurkha Rifles (1/4 GR), was deployed to France, as part of 9th (Sirhind) Brigade, the 3rd (Lahore) Division, Indian Corps, to form part of Indian Expeditionary Force A, to reinforce British Expeditionary Force (BEF) in France. The orbat of Sirhind Brigade included one British infantry battalion (1st Battalion, Highland Light Infantry), one Indian (125th Napier's Rifles) and two Gurkha (1/1st Gurkha Rifles and 1/4th). The battalion arrived at Marseilles from Egypt on 30 November, and was hurriedly deployed to the front in December 1914. As a part of the Sirhind brigade, 1/4 GR GR saw action in the battles of Givenchy, Neuve Chapelle and Ypres, in France. The battalion was sent to Gallipoli, disembarked on 1 September 1915 and departed on 19 December 1915. In April 1916 the 3rd (Lahore) Division was deployed to Mesopotamia.

The 2nd Battalion 4th Gurkha Rifles (2/4) Raising 22 Apr 1886 Bakloh (HP) 2/4 GR Ops Participeted ( Chin Lushai Manipur Expidation-1889-91) [(Manipur Expidation-1891)] [Tirah-1893-1898], Punjab Frontier1897-98, ( Kohat Kurram in North west frontier Prevince1914-1915) [Tigris 1916], Mesopotamia Campaign ,Iraq Baghdad Victory 08-11 Mar 1917- Baghdad Day] saw service in , Mesopotamia Solonica, in Greece 1914-1918,( Kut-AL-Amara 1917) > (Khyeber -1923), [Ramzak 1923-1931], [Iraq and Syria war ,Syria and Westeran Desert OPs 1941 > Couldron 1941]- ( Monte Cedrone-1944) : [(Gurais War (OP ERAZE) Kanzalwan 23 july-30 July 1948 > Battle Honour Gurais-1948)] , [(UN Mission Middle East (UNIFIL) South Lebanon -1998-99)]

3rd Battalion, 4th Gurkha Rifles (3/4 GR), was ordered to be raised during the war; but due to a clerical error the 4th Battalion, 3rd Gurkha Rifles (4/3) was raised. 3/4 GR was eventual raised in World War II, in Bakloh, on 1 October 1940.

=== World War I war diaries ===
Transcripts of War Diaries of Indian army units and formations that participated in World War I, including 1st Battalion 4th Gurkha Rifles (1/4 GR), 3rd (Lahore) Division, are now available on line, as part of "Operation War Diary", a Zooniverse, crowdsourced project. The transcripts of 1/4 GR war diaries, which provide interesting insights into day-to-day activities, movements of the unit and subunits, and individual experiences of officers and soldiers are now available on Zooniverse web site.

=== World War II ===
During World War II, the third and fourth battalions (3/4 GR and 4/4 GR) were raised in Bakloh, on 15 November 1940 and on 15 March 1941 respectively. The battalions of the regiment saw action in Iraq and Syria, in the Middle East, Egypt, in North Africa, Cyprus, in the Mediterranean, Italy, in Europe, India's border areas in Nagaland, Manipur, and Mizoram, and the Far East.

==== Burma Campaign ====
During the Burma Campaign the first battalion (1/4 GR) formed part of 48 Infantry Brigade, which in turn was part of the 17th Indian Infantry Division. It took part in the Battle of Sittang Bridge in February 1942, and the retreat into India. During this period the battalion was commanded by Lieutenant Colonel "Joe" Lentaigne. In 1944 the battalion participated in the Battle of Imphal.

Soon after it was raised in October 1940, the third battalion (3/4 GR) was assigned to the 111th Indian Infantry Brigade. This brigade was part of the Chindits and was commanded by "Joe" Lentaigne, who had been promoted to Brigadier. It took part in the second Chindit expedition, Operation Thursday, in 1944. When Major General Orde Wingate, the overall commander of the Chindits, was killed in an air crash, Brigadier Lentaigne succeeded him. Major John Masters took command of the main body of 111 Brigade.

The fourth Battalion (4/4 GR) distinguished itself in the storming of Mandalay Hill in Burma, in 1945.

==== Iraq, Syria, and Italy ====
2/4 GR was the only Battalion of the 4 Gorkha Rifles that served in the Middle East and Europe. In the wake of the growing threats to Iraq following the fall of France, the battalion embarked from Karachi in May 1941. It disembarked in Shatt-Al-Arab, on 5 May 1941. In Iraq it formed part of 10 Indian Infantry Division, commanded by Maj Gen Bill Slim, later Field Marshal Slim. Except for the Commanding Officer and few field officers, all officers were Emergency Commissioned Officers. On 24 May 1941, it participated in the operations to secure Basra, and areas north of Basra, along the west bank of River Euphrates, in a combined all arms, night assault. On 25 May 1941, the battalion was air lifted to reinforce and secure Habbaniyanh, a RAF base, under threat from Iraqi ground troops and German aerial attacks from Luftwaffe, based in Mosul, and Baghdad.

In June 1941, after a successful campaign in Iraq, including securing of Haditha, the battalion was deployed in Syria, against the Vichy French army, and along the Syria _Turkish border. In Syria, it participated in operation to capture Deir ez-Zor, and the occupation of Raqqa, which has lately gained prominence as the epi-centre of ISIL or Islamic State of Iraq and the Levant activities.

After the successful campaigns Iraq, Syria, along the Persian border, the battalion left Iraq by road for Palestine, to participate in the war in North Africa where it was overrun by two Bersaglieri battalions of the Italian Trento Division storming the fortress of Mersa Matruh on 29 June 1942. It was later rebuilt and deployed to Cyprus and subsequently fought in the Italian Campaign.

=== Regiment in books ===
A prominent figure who joined the 4th Gurkha Rifles as a regular officer during the thirties, was the author John Masters, who participated in operations on the North West Frontier, in Iraq (where he served as battalion adjutant), the Second Chindit Operation, the capture of Mandalay and at one point commanded the 3rd Battalion of the regiment. His autobiographical books Bugles and a Tiger, The Road past Mandalay, and Pilgrim's Son portray life in the Indian Army and the 4th Gurkha Rifles during this period. Masters won a Military Cross (MC), and Distinguished Service Order (DSO), in Burma, and after the war become a celebrated writer.

== Customs, traditions, and regimental arcana ==
The regiment drills and standards are similar to British 'Greenjackets'. It marches 'quickstep' at 180 paces a minute on parade, the same former pace as the other Indian Army rifle regiments, in its own ceremonies, while doing the same 120 paces if marching with other units. Commanders in 4th Gorkha Rifles, unlike other regiments in the Indian Army, but like the many former rifle regiments of the British Army (and now the sole regiment The Rifles), wear (a plain Black) Lanyard attached to a whistle over the Jersey. The intention of this arrangement is to facilitate use of the whistle with the left hand, while leaving the right hand free to use the sword. The uniform and insignia are Spartan; the regiment prides itself on its simplicity and disregard for pomp and ceremony. '4 GR', in black metal, is worn as regimental signage on the shoulder straps by all ranks.

The official, and correct, spelling of 'gorkha', since February 1949, is Gorkha, and not Gurkha, as the British still choose to spell it.

== Uniform ==
The first uniforms obtained for the regiment, during the chaotic period of 1857–58, were makeshift whites dyed khaki-drab in the bazaar. Dark rifle-green uniforms with black cuff facings were subsequently adopted to be worn with the round peakless Kilmarnock cap common to all Gurkha regiments. Together with black metal buttons and insignia these items were to remain features of the dress uniforms of the regiment until the present day. Khaki drill was worn for active service and hot-weather dress from 1873 on. John Masters records that after World War I the historic rifle-green was retained only for the mess uniforms of officers and the full dress uniforms of pipers and mess order.

== Regimental Centre ==
The Regimental Center was formed on 15 November 1940 in Bakloh. The first commandant was Colonel TDC Owens, MC, who commanded the centre for five years during World War II.

=== Transition 1947–48 ===
In 1947, just before independence, all Gorkha Regiments, including the 4th Gorkha Rifles (GR), received orders from the Commander in Chief of the Indian army, that Gorkha regiments which opt to remain with the Indian army, were to be transferred 'intact', including mess property and regimental funds. British officers of many Gorkha Regiments, including 5 RGR (FF) and 9 GR, did not comply with these instructions and transferred funds and properties to England before 15 August 1947. 4 GR too managed to transfer part of the regiment funds before independence to England. These regimental funds were used to fund a corpus for a war memorial, for publishing volume 3 of the regimental history, and Rupees 8000, was used to transfer and install the memorial tablet in the St Oswald Church in Bakloh to England.

The last British commandant of the centre was Colonel RAN Davidson, formerly 2/4 GR, a bachelor who had spent much of World War II as a Japanese POW. He took over the centre for three months on 1 January 1948. He handed over the centre on 18 January 1948 to Lt Colonel Rajbir Chopra, formerly of the Rajput Regiment, who became the first Indian commandant of the 4GRRC. Colonel Ran Davidson, however, continued as adviser till 27 March 1948. Colonel RAN Davidson in his short tenure managed to gain the affection and respect of the young officers. The Subedar Major of the 4GRRC in 1948 was SM Sher Jung, the previous SM Agam Gurung having been promoted as officer. The regiment was allowed to promote thirteen Gorkha Officers as commissioned officers.

In 1948 out of total of 50 officers posted to Gorkha Regiments from Indian Military Academy (IMA), Dehradun, to make up for the departing British officers, 9 young officers were posted to 4GRRC, Bakloh. Of these 9 young officers (YOs), 6 remained with the regiment, the rest were posted to other regiments after a short stay at Bakloh. The YOs traveled to Bakloh on 4 January 1948, on the same day, as Colonel RAN Davidson, the new commandant of 4GRRC.

=== Move from Bakloh ===
In the wake of the Partition of India, in 1947, the 4th Gorkha Rifles (GR) Regimental Center and Depot, was shifted from Bakloh to Dharamshala, the Centre of the 1 Gorkha Rifles, then to Chakrata, and Clement Town, in Dehradun, and finally to Sabathu, Shimla Hills, HP in April 1960. In Sabathu the 4th Gorkha Rifles Centre was merged with the 1 Gorkha Rifles Centre to form the First and Fourth Gorkha Training Centre (14 GTC).

== Battalions of the regiment ==
=== 1/4 GR ===
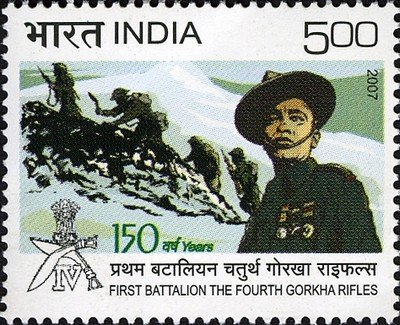
2007 Postal Stamp on 150 years of First Battalion, The Fourth Gorkha Rifles

The 1st Battalion, 4th Gorkha Rifles (1/4 GR), JETHI Paltan, was raised in Pithoragarh, Uttaranchal, in 1857. In 2002, it was awarded the COAS Unit Citation, for its performance in counter terrorism operations in Kupwara district, Kashmir. The battalion was commended for neutralizing 94 Foreign Terrorists, in Tangdhar, Panzgam and Lolab. The battalion suffered two fatal casualties, Capt Anirban Bandhyopadhyay and Nb Sub Deb Bahadur Thapa. They were posthumously awarded the Sena Medal and the Kirti Chakra respectively.

=== 2/4 GR ===
The 2nd Battalion, 4th Gorkha Rifles (2/4 GR), Maili Paltan, was raised in Bakloh, in 22 Apr 1886. 1st Bn Cdr Major JM Herman, Bn Sub Maj Kulpati Gurung 2/4 GR 1st World War Iraq Mesopotamia Campaign into entry Baghdad 08 march Lunching for Attaking tps Objt Capture [ first Light 11 march 1917 Baghdad city British Victory] 1947–48 war, Operation Eraze, the spring offensive by Major General K S Thimayya, GOC 19 Infantry Division, in June–July, 1948, 2/4 GR and 1 Grenadiers, secured and drove the enemy out from areas Gurais and Kanzalwan, thus ending the threat to Srinagar, J and K, from the north. In 1998–99, 2/4 GR Battalion Group commanded by Col G S Batabyal, was deployed in support of the UN peace keeping mission, in South Lebanon, as part of UNIFIL, in area Ibl al-Saqi [Mahatma Gandhi Park Inauguration by Indian Ambassador Mr Ajay Choudhry 14 Oct 1999 Ebel-Es-Saqi] along the Israel–Lebanon border in the Golan Heights. 2/4 GR celebrated its 125th anniversary, or the Quasquicentennial anniversary, in Trivandrum, Kerala, over the period 21–24 April 2011. The anniversary was attended among others by Major General BD Kale, former commanding officer of the battalion, and the President of the 4 GR Officer's Association. The unit is presently located in Andaman & Nicobar island as the part the newly raised Tri-service commands. It was also awarded the COAS citation on 15 January 2026 by the Chief of Army Staff on the occasion of army day.

=== 3/4 GR ===
The 3rd Battalion, 4th Gorkha Rifles (3/4 GR), Chindits, Sainli Paltan, was raised in the Leslie Lines, Bakloh, on 1 October 1940. The nucleus of the new battalion was formed by drafts of 3 officers and 200 men each from the 1st and 2nd Battalions. The remainder of the battalion was formed from recruits and 'recruit boys'. Soon after the raising the battalion moved into Tytler lines after the First battalion moved to Ambala. The Leslie lines were turned over for raising the Regimental Centre. The battalion held its first attestation parade on 15 March 1941. Soon after it was moved to Chaman, Baluchistan, now in Pakistan, to form part of the Khojak Brigade. It occupied defensive positions between Chitral and Duzdhap, on the India-Iran border, to meet threats from either Nazi Germany or USSR. In March 1944 the battalion was called to provide nucleus for the raising of the 4th Battalion. On 16 June the battalion was ordered to form part of 111 Independent Brigade, under Brigadier Joe Lentaigne, as part of the Chindit, which was being concentrated in the area of Saugor for training.

The 3rd Battalion has an enviable war record. Over the period 20–24 September 1987, during Operation Meghdoot Saichen, 3/4 GR, while relieving 8 Jammu and Kashmir Light Infantry in Bilafond La, in Siachen, at heights of nearly 20,000 feet (6,100 m), participated in the defence of Bilafond La beating back repeated Pakistan army attacks, which ended on 24 September morning in failure and retreat. In the battle of Bilafond La, from 20 to 24 September, the 3/4 GR lost 13 killed and 23 wounded. The defenders for their courage, steadfastness, and resolution against heavy odds, were awarded 3 Maha Vir Chakra(MVC), 5 Vir Chakras (Vr C), 2 Sena Medals (SM), 1 Chief of Army Staff's Commendation card, and 3 Army Commanders Commendation Cards. MVC, India's second highest award for valor, was awarded to Major Krishna Gopal Chatterjee, L Havildar Nar Bahadur Ale (Posthumous), and Naik Prem Bahadur Gurung (Posthumous). VrC, equivalent to Military Cross, was awarded to 2/Lt AK Sharma, AOC, Second in Command Charlie Company, Naib Subedar Bhim Bahadur Thapa, Platoon commander, C company, Lance Naik Hira Bahadur Thapa ( Posthumous), Medium Machine Gun (MMG) Detachment commander, Rifleman Sanjeev Gurung (Posthumous), and Naik Hom Bahadur Thapa, MMG Detachment Commander. The Third Battalion remains one of the most decorated units the Indian army.

=== 4/4 GR ===
The 4th Battalion, 4th Gorkha Rifles (4/4 GR), the Kainli Paltan, also called Phor Phor, was first raised on 15 March 1941 in Bakloh. It like the 3rd Battalion was provided by drafts by the 1st and 2nd Battalions. It composition on raising was half Gurung-Magar and half Limbu Rai. After six months in Bakloh, it was ordered to move to Ahmednagar to form part of 62 Brigade. During this period the battalion had no vehicles; it lacked even weapons and was far from ready for operational duties. In World war it saw action in Burma; participating in the battle of Mandalay. After World War II it was demobilised in Dalhousie Cantonment (Tikka barracks), with a final farewell parade in the Regimental Centre, Bakloh, on 18 October 1946. In the nine and a half month-long campaign in Burma, 97 ( 4 Gurkha Officers and 93 other ranks) lost their lives and 298 were wounded ( 7 British officers, 5 Gurkha officers, and 286 other ranks). It was re-raised in November 1962, in Bakloh, Himachal Pradesh, following the Chinese Aggression in 1962. It celebrated its Golden Jubilee at Dera Baba Nanak (DBN), Punjab, on 22–25 November 2011.

=== 5/4 GR ===
The 5th Battalion, 4th Gorkha Rifles, 5/4 GR, the Kannchi Paltan, was raised on 1 January 1963, in the wake of the Chinese Invasion, by Lt Colonel Ranjit Singh Chandel, formerly of 1/4 GR, at Ambala Cantonment, Haryana, the 5/4 GR Engagements Bajra Garhi Sugarcane Anula victory Punjab Pak Theatre 08 Sep 1965, the sprawling cantonment town, north of Delhi. In 1988, 5/4 GR celebrated its Silver Jubilee in Naraina, Delhi Cantonment. On 19–21 October 2012, the battalion celebrated its Golden Jubilee, in Gandhinagar, Gujarat. The Golden Jubilee program included Wreath Laying, Guard of Honor, Sainik Sammelan and Barakhana. Over 200 Bhu Puus (bhut purva or former Ex Servicemen, in Nepalese), attended the jubilee with their wives, children, and grandchildren.

== Regimental reunions ==
In addition to the Jubilee celebration and reunions, the 4th Gorkha Rifles organizes a Regimental Reunion every four years, usually at Sabathu, the Regimental Centre of the First and 4th Gorkha Rifles.

== Regimental Day ==
The Regimental day of the 4th Gorkha Rifles is 11 March. It commemorates the 1st Battalion's action in the Battle of Neuve Chapelle in France and the 2nd Battalion's Mesopotamia Campaign and 2/4GR entry into Baghdad 8 March Lunching for Attaking tps British Victory Baghdad city 11 March 1917 ww-I (albeit in different years), during World War I. On the occasion of the regimental day officers and men of the regiment exchange greeting, and meet over lunch or dinner. The main regimental day lunch for serving and retired officers is usually held at an officers mess, or the Infantry Mess and Hostel in Delhi cantonment. The lunch is usually scheduled on the first holiday in the week of the regimental day(11 March). In 2015 it was held on 15 March, a Sunday. The Regimental day event is in addition to the annual luncheons hosted by the 14 Gorkha Training Centre, in October, for all 1 GR and 4 GR officers, and by the Gorkha Brigade, for officers of all the Gorkha Regiments, in February, in Delhi Cantonment. A report on the event is usually carried in the Newsletter. In 2011, the main regimental day lunch was held in Noida, the burgeoning city East of Delhi, across the river Yamuna, in Uttar Pradesh, which has large concentration of senior 4 GR retired officers. Regimental day luncheons, on a smaller scale, are also organized in Pune, Mhow, and other towns. In 2012, the combined 1 GR and 4GR lunch was held in Delhi Cantonment. It was attended by 85 officers and their families. During the event, the Colonel of the two regiments, presented an account of the activities of the two regiments.

== Fourth Gorkha Rifles Officers' Association ==
The Fourth Gorkha Rifles Officers' Association, is an association of serving and retired officers of the 4th Gorkha Rifles (4 GR), an infantry regiment of the Indian Army. The 4 GR has two Officers Associations: one in the India, and another in the United Kingdom (UK). The two officers associations have had, and continue to have, close relations.

=== 4 GR Officers Association, UK ===
The officers association in the UK, known as the 4th Prince of Wales' (PWO) Gurkha Rifles Officers' Association, is an association of former British Officers of the 4GR, formed on 13 June 1947, on the initiative of the late Major General Arthur Mill, who is fondly referred to as Uncle Arthur. The aim of the association, Sir Arthur Mills in a letter to Colonel Hamish Mackay, the centre commandant, in Bakloh, said was "until the end of the century to keep alive the history and traditions of the Regiment". The 4 GR officers Association, UK, in memory of its association with the 4 GR maintains the Gurkha Memorial Gardens, near the St Giles Church, in Stoke Poges, South Buckinghamshire district of Buckinghamshire, England. The UK association is smaller than the main association in India; and is fast dwindling on account of age and attrition. The head of the British 4 GR officers Association is Dicky Day. The UK association celebrated its golden jubilee on 13 June 1997, with a large gathering, church service, exchange of messages, speeches, a sit down lunch for 132, at the stoke Park Golf club, and toasts to the Regiment, the Queen, the President of India, and the King of Nepal. The Golden Jubilee was covered by a TV crew from BBC, and the pipe and drums from 1st Battalion Royal Gurkha Rifles was in attendance to make ' a Figure of Eight, showing Spy Roll and slow to quick followed by three Sets and Retreat'. The Indian contingent at the Golden jubilee get together included 4 serving, and two retired officers, including the Colonel of the Regiment, Lt General Baldev Singh, and COs of 1/4, 2/4, and 3/4 Gorkha Rifles, and their wives.

=== 4 GR Officers Association, India ===
The Officers Association of 4 GR, in India, of which all serving and retired 4 GR officers are members, is called the Fourth Gorkha Rifles Officers' Association. It was formed at the initiative of late Major General GS Gill, former Colonel of 4 GR. The head of the Indian and the UK associations, known as the president of the Fourth Gorkha Rifles Association, is usually a senior retired officer of the regiment, and often a former Colonel of the Regiment. He serves as a link between the British and the India 4 GR Associations. The current President of the 4GR Officers association is Major General (Retired) B D Kale, formerly of 2/4 GR.

=== Relations between the Indian and British officers' associations ===
The relations between the Indian and the UK 4 GR Officers associations have been, and remain, close and active. They exchange visits, letters, mementos, and memories. Indian officers on visit to the UK often visit Stoke Poges, meet old officers, and attend 'Remembrance day'. British officers, in turn, are often guest of the 4 Gorkha Rifles Officers Association, in India, and are invariably invited to attend Reunion and Jubilee celebrations. In 2011, Maj Geoffery Loyd, formerly 1/4 GR, attended the 125 year anniversary celebration of the 2/4 GR, in Trivandrum, Kerala, in April 2011, and the Reunion, 2011, 27–29 November 2011, in Sabathu, HP, along with a 10 British dependent 'members'. During the reunion Major Lloyd, laid wreath at the war memorial, made a speech, and presented 357 pounds to the '4GR welfare fund', on behalf of the British contingent, and before leaving told the President of the 4 GR Association that because of his age this would be his last visit to India.

== Fourth Gorkha Rifles Officers' Association Newsletters ==
The Officers Association of Fourth Gorkha Rifles publishes an annual Newsletter (NL). The NL has been in print since 1977. The first NL was brought out by Lt Colonel Vijay Madan, VSM, during the Regimental reunion in February 1977, the second reunion held after 1957 reunion. In 1997 it was decided that the NL, starting with NL 22, will also have a Nepali section. Each battalion was expected to submit at least two articles in Nepalese for the NL. The NL operates on shoe string budget. The charges for bringing out NL 21, in 1997, was a mere Rupees 14,539. It is published with the assistance of 14 Gorkha Rifles Training Centre, Sabathu Cantonment.

=== Editor and publisher ===
The editor of the NL is chosen by consensus from among volunteer retired officers of the regiment and is appointed by the President of the 4 GR Association. Past NL editors have included Lt Colonel Vijay Madan (1977–1980), Brigadier Hem Tiwari (1981–84), Brigadier NK Gurung (1985–86), Brigadier HS Sodhi, formerly of 4/4 GR (1987–93), and Brigadier, (Retired), Prem K Gupta, formerly 5/4 GR. The current editor of the NL is Brigadier RPS Negi, Retired, formerly 2/4 GR. The editor of the NL is assisted by an editorial team, which includes a serving officer of the regiment usually posted at 14 Gorkha Training Centre, Sabathu.

=== Contents ===
The NL which started as an English-language journal, since 1999, has had two sections: an English section, which is approximately 150–180 pages, and a Hindi- and the Nepali-language sections, which is about 30–40 pages. It has a standard layout and content list. It includes a 'President's Message', 'Colonel's Page', Editor's page, 'Secretary's note' News of veterans, 4 GR Battalions (1/4 GR, 2/4 GR, 3/4 GR, 4/4 GR, 5/4 GR and 15 RR), Gorkha Sabhas in Bakloh, and Dharamshala, reminiscences by retired and serving officers, obituaries, and articles by retired British officers of the 4GR.

== See also ==
- Bakloh
- Gorkha Regiments of the Indian Army
- The Fifth Battalion the Fourth Gorkha Rifles
