= Walter Lentaigne =

British Army general (1899-1955)

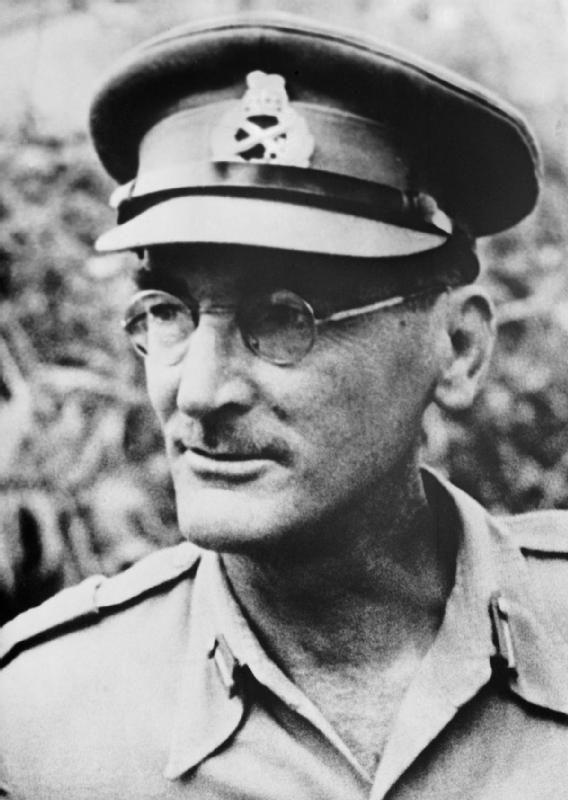
- Born: 15 July 1899
- Died: 24 June 1955 (aged 55)
- Military career
- Allegiance: British India
- Branch: British Indian Army
- Service years: 1918–1955
- Rank: Lieutenant General
- Nickname: "Joe"
- Unit: 4th Gorkha Rifles
- Commands: Defence Services Staff College (1948–55); 39th Infantry Division (1945–46); Chindits (1944–45); 111th Indian Infantry Brigade (1943–44); 63rd Indian Infantry Brigade (1942–43); 1st Battalion 4th Prince of Wales's Own Gurkha Rifles (1941–42)
- Conflicts: Third Anglo-Afghan War; North-West Frontier; First Waziristan Campaign; Second Waziristan Campaign; Third Waziristan Campaign; Second World War
- Awards: Companion of the Order of the Bath; Commander of the Order of the British Empire; Distinguished Service Order; Mentioned in Despatches (3)

Lieutenant General Walter David Alexander Lentaigne, CB, CBE, DSO (15 July 1899 – 24 June 1955), also known as Joe Lentaigne, was a senior officer in the British Indian Army.

== Early life ==
Lentaigne was born the elder son of Justice Benjamin Plunkett Lentaigne of the Burma High Court. He was educated at The Oratory School, Edgbaston, Birmingham. His family had origins in Navan, County Meath in Ireland, but was domiciled in then Burma (a part of British India). He was one of two domiciled European officers serving in the Independent Indian Army, the other being T. B. Henderson Brooks.

Lentaigne had a brother, Commander Charles Nugent Lentaigne, who commanded HMS Gurkha, launched in July 1940, by Mary, daughter of Winston Churchill. The ship was originally to be named Larne; however, after the Tribal-class Gurkha was sunk in April 1940, the officers and men of the Gurkha Regiments each subscribed one day's pay to replace her, and Larne was renamed before launching. Whilst escorting a Malta convoy, the ship was torpedoed 17 January 1942 off Sidi Barani and later scuttled.

== Military career ==
Lentaigne joined British Indian Army as second lieutenant in October 1918 in 4th Gurkha Rifles. He fought in the Third Anglo-Afghan War in 1919. During the Second World War, he commanded a battalion during the 1942 Burma Campaign and was later given command of 63rd Indian Infantry Brigade.

In 1943, Lentaigne was personally selected by General Archibald Wavell (the Commander-in-Chief, India) to form and command the 111th Indian Infantry Brigade as a long-range penetration brigade. In 1944, in the midst of the second Chindit operation (Operation Thursday) he was appointed commander of the Chindit Force and led the force until it was disbanded in 1945.

Lentaigne then led the Indian Army's jungle training programs as commander of the 39th Indian Infantry Division. He served in the postwar Indian Army and rose finally to the rank of lieutenant general. As the second Commandant of the newly created Defence Services Staff College, he was instrumental in seeking the creation of a unique inter-Services Staff College, based on experiences of the Second World War. He would serve as the Commandant from 1949 to 1955.

=== Career highlights ===
- 1899 Born
- 1918 Joined 4th Prince of Wales's Own Gurkha Rifles
- 1919 Third Anglo-Afghan War
- 1919–1924 Served in Waziristan, North West Frontier
- 1925–1929 Garrison and Depot duty, Bakloh, India
- 1930–1934 Served in Tirah, North West Frontier
- 1935–1936 Attended British Army Staff College, Camberley
- 1936–1939 Waziristan, North West Frontier
- Second World War
  - 1938–1941 Deputy Assistant Quartermaster General at General Headquarters(GHQ) India
  - 1941–1942 Instructor at the Indian Army Staff College, Quetta
  - 1942 Commanding Officer 1st Battalion, 4th Gurkha Rifles. Took part in the retreat from Burma, into India. Better described in "British Commanders" Published June 1945 by British Information Services in the US as commanding a battalion which was landed in Burma in time to take part in General Alexander's battling withdrawal. He soon gained a legendary name for bravery. "Once this bespectacled giant had his revolver kicked out of his hand in a hand-to-hand scrap with four Japs. He tore the sword from the leader's hand and killed him with it; then, turning on the others, hewed one to the ground and chased the other two back into the jungle. Another time, when the Japanese had captured an ambulance convoy, a wounded officer in one of them heard a noise which he described as like the roaring of the Bull of Bashan. It was Joe Lentaigne arriving. He had charged ahead of his Gurkhas and arrived first, killing several Japs before they caught up with him. The ambulances were saved."
  - 1943 Temporarily commanded 63rd Indian Infantry Brigade in Imphal, India. Subsequently, raised 111th Indian Infantry Brigade, a Long Range Penetration formation.
  - 1944 Led 111 Brigade in Operation Thursday, the second Chindit operation. On 24 March 1944 succeeded to command of Special Force / 3rd Indian Infantry Division, on the death of Major General Orde Wingate in an air crash. Commanded the Chindits until they were disbanded early in 1945.
- 1945 General Officer Commanding Indian 39th Infantry Division
- 1946 Attended Imperial Defence College
- 1947 Director of Military Operations (18 Feb – 14 May)
- 1947 Deputy Quartermaster General at GHQ India (15 May – 15 Aug)
- 1947 Deputy Quartermaster General at GHQ, British Troops in India and Pakistan. (15 Aug 1947 – 15 Mar 1948)
- 1948–1955 Commandant of the Defence Services Staff College, Wellington (16 March 1948 – 12 March 1955)
- 1955 Retired as lieutenant general and returned to the United Kingdom owing to bad health.

=== Lentaigne and the Chindits ===
Lentaigne was an outsider in the Chindit organization. He was appointed by General Wavell in the spring of 1943 to raise 111th Indian Brigade as a second Chindit Brigade. Because Wingate was in Burma conducting the Chindit operation (Operation Longcloth), he was unable to influence the choice. Wingate's dislike of Indian Army officers and in particular officers of Gurkha battalions also worked against Lentaigne. He objected to the appointment after he learned of it but was unable to do anything about it.

On Wingate's death, Lentaigne took over command of the Chindit organization. He was the senior most officer in the Chindits and also had the most command experience. General Slim described the problems involved in replacing Wingate within the Chindits: 'To step into Wingate's place would be no easy task. His successor had to be someone known to the men of Special Force, one who had shared their hardships and in whose skill and courage they could trust'. Again, "British Commanders" states "the inevitable choice for the new chief of the Chindits was Major General Lentaigne. He was one of Wingate's closest disciples and a veteran of the Burma fighting."

Amongst his rivals for the position including Mike Calvert and Derek Tulloch there was criticism of this decision. They alleged that Lentaigne was the Chindit leader least in tune with Wingate's methods and tactics. They also pointed out that he had commanded 111 Indian Brigade in the field for only a few weeks. After the war, certain of his rivals used the comments of his Brigade Major John Masters with regard to Lentaigne's age out of context to attack him.

Lentaigne had been a distinguished battalion commander who had fought during the 1942 Burma campaign. The other Chindit brigade commanders were unknown quantities lacking Staff College qualifications or significant time in command of even a battalion-sized formation. Additionally, there was no clear successor to Wingate even among his closest followers. Each of them thought that they would have been (or were) Wingate's obvious successor. Field Marshal Lord Slim wrote in his memoirs of the Burma War, Defeat into Victory, that after Wingate's death, at least three officers went to him, and told him, separately and confidentially, that Wingate had designated each of them as the divisional commander, in the event of his death.

== Post-war career ==
In his book Red Coats to Olive Green, Colonel V. Longer has listed Lentaigne as one of the handful of British general officers to be offered attachment to, and service in, the post-independence Indian Army. Among the others were General Sir Rob Lockhart, Lieutenant General Sir Dudley Russell, and Major General H. Williams, who, as engineer-in-chief, was the last to retire, late in 1955. He was acting Director Military Operations but was eased out as he proposed a 25-mile border corridor in Punjab under British troops to save innocent people.(Ref. Transfer of Power, 8 Aug 1947 meeting) Nehru opposed him tooth and nail and was overruled by Mountbatten. In February 1948, he was asked to lead Defence Services Staff College (DSSC), Wellington in the Nilgiris in what's now the south Indian state of Tamil Nadu. In 1950, he predicted problems for India after conquest of Tibet by China and sparred with visiting foreign secretary of India at Wellington. (Ref. Himalayan Blunder by John Dalvi). He would serve as the Commandant DSSC Wellington from 1948 to 1955. He retired in 1955 and died soon after returning to London.

== See also ==
- John Masters, brigade major and subsequent commander of 111 Indian Infantry Brigade
- Joseph Stilwell, American general

== Bibliography ==
- Doherty, Richard (2004). Ireland's Generals in the Second World War. Four Courts Press. ISBN 9781851828654.
- Mead, Richard (2007). Churchill's Lions: a biographical guide to the key British generals of World War II. Stroud (UK): Spellmount. ISBN 978-1-86227-431-0.
- Smart, Nick (2005). Biographical Dictionary of British Generals of the Second World War. Barnesley: Pen & Sword. ISBN 1844150496.

Military offices
| Preceded by Brigadier S D Verma | Commandant of the Defence Services Staff College; 1948–1955 | Succeeded by Major General P S Gyani |
| Preceded by Major General Orde Wingate | Commander Chindits; 1944–1945 | Succeeded by Unit disbanded |
