= Leigh Alexander =

South African cricketer

Personal information
- Full name: Leigh Arbuthnot Alexander
- Born: 4 July 1898; Umzinto, Natal, South Africa
- Died: 28 April 1943 (aged 44); Chindwin, British Burma

Career statistics
Competition	FC
Matches	3
Runs scored	79
Batting average	15.80
100s/50s	-/-
Top score	20
Balls bowled	0
Wickets	0
Bowling average	–
5 wickets in innings	–
10 wickets in match	–
Best bowling	–
Catches/stumpings	1/–
- Source: CricketArchive, 14 January 2011

Lieutenant-Colonel Leigh Arbuthnot Alexander (4 July 1898 – 28 April 1943) was a British Army officer and cricketer.

== Early life ==
Alexander was the son of Major William Alexander and Ethel Rubina Arbuthnot and brother of Gilbert Alexander. He was born at Umzinto, Colony of Natal, South Africa.

== Military career ==
Alexander joined the Gurkhas on 11 May 1917 during the First World War and first saw service on the North West Frontier. He was commissioned into the British Indian Army on the 27 October 1917. He was promoted to Captain in 1922 and to Major in 1935.

In the Second World War he commanded the 3rd Battalion, 2nd Gurkha Rifles, and took part in the 1st Chindit expedition, a deep penetration raid behind Japanese lines, with the 77th Indian Infantry Brigade, when he died during the operation. His is buried in Taukkyan War Cemetery.

== Cricket ==
He played first-class cricket in three matches in the 1920s.
