= 111th Indian Infantry Brigade =

- Active: 1943–1945
- Country: British India
- Allegiance: British Crown
- Branch: British Indian Army
- Size: Brigade
- Engagements: Burma Campaign

Commanders
- Notable commanders: Brigadier W D A Lentaigne; Brigadier J R Morris; Brigadier F D Rome

The 111th Indian Infantry Brigade was an Infantry formation of the Indian Army during World War II. The brigade was formed in March 1943, in India as a Long Range Penetration Brigade attached to the Chindits 3rd Indian Infantry Division.

== Formation ==
- 4th Battalion, 9th Gurkha Rifles to March 1945
- 1st Battalion, Cameronians (Scottish Rifles) to July 1944
- 3rd Battalion, 4th Gurkha Rifles July 1943 to March 1945
- 2nd Battalion, Leicestershire Regiment September 1943 to October 1944
- 6th Battalion, Nigeria Regiment November 1944 to March 1945

== See also ==
- List of Indian Army Brigades in World War II
