= Charles Nugent Lentaigne =

Royal Navy officer

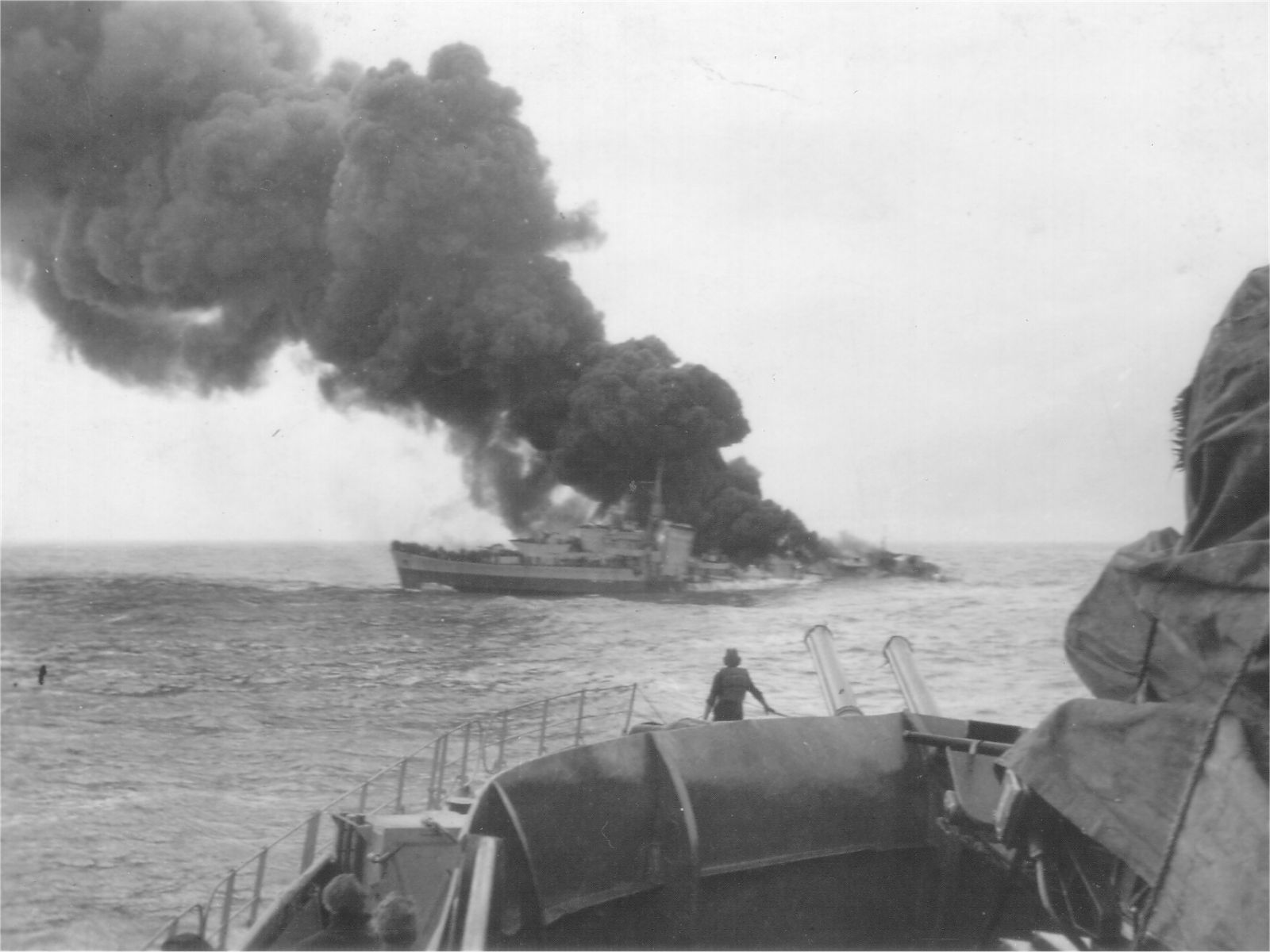
HMS Gurkha sinking after being torpedoed, 1942.

Charles Nugent Lentaigne (26 April 1901 – 6 November 1981) DSO was a Royal Navy officer who commanded HMS Gurkha (F63/G63) during the Second World War.
