= Třeština =

- Municipality
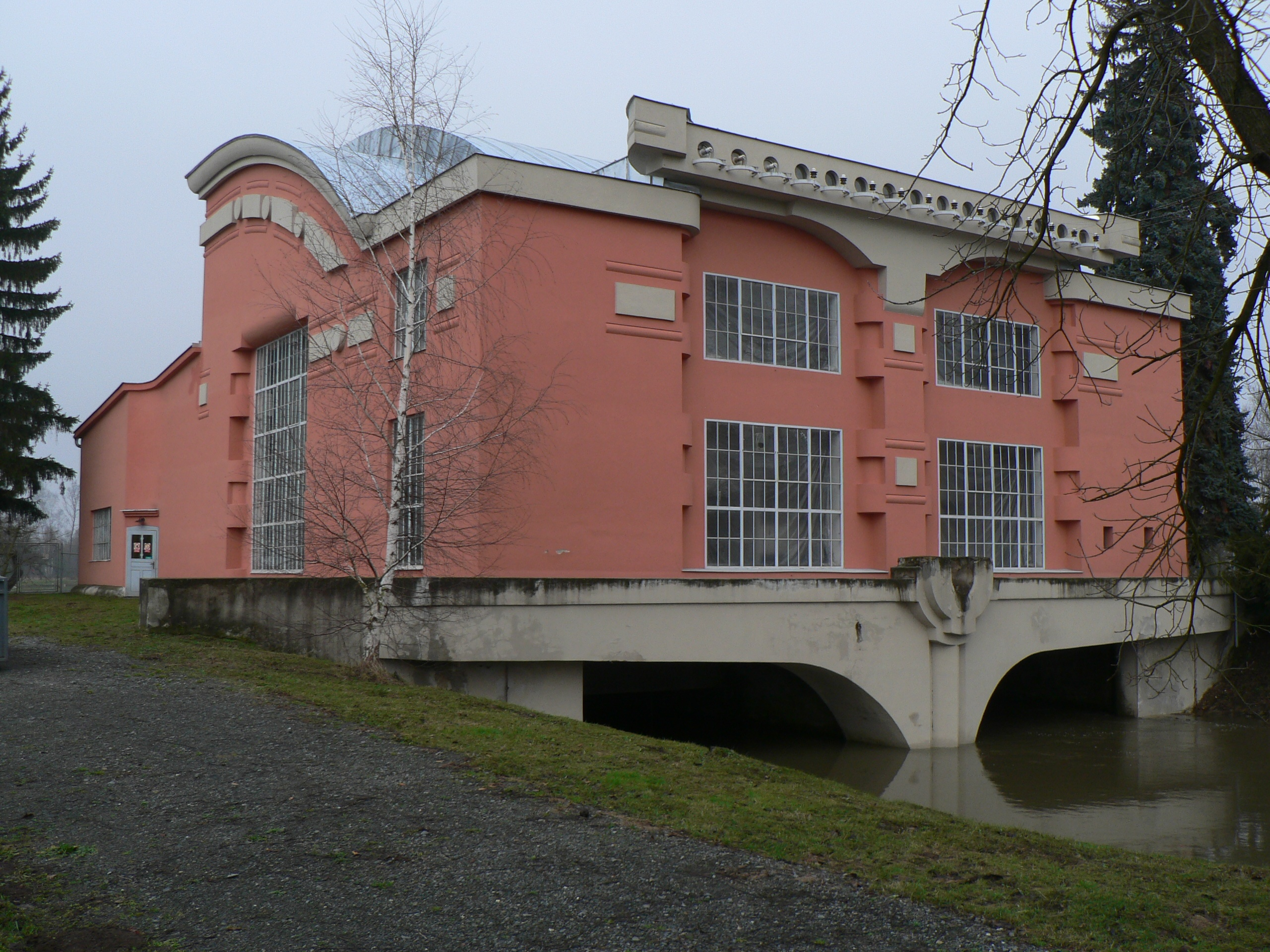
- Hydroelectric power plant

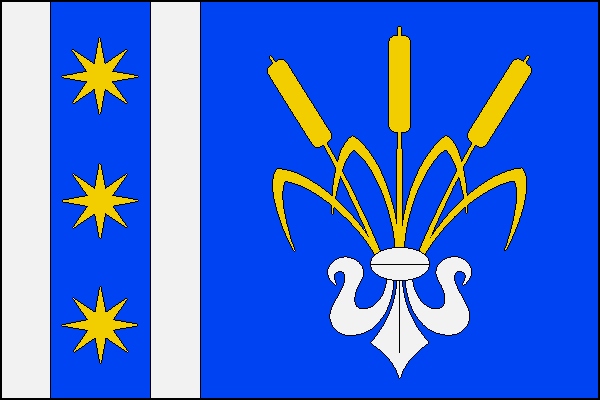
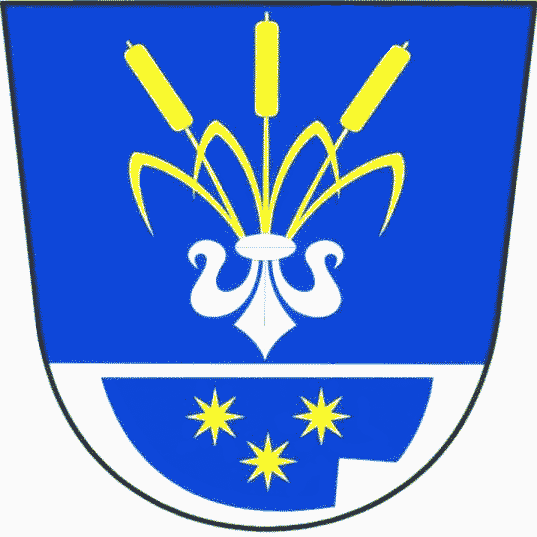
- Flag Coat of arms

- Location in the Czech Republic
- Coordinates: 49°47′46″N 16°57′50″E
- Country: Czech Republic
- Region: Olomouc
- District: Šumperk
- First mentioned: 1353

Area
  - Total: 5.43 km^{2} (2.10 sq mi)
- Elevation: 255 m (837 ft)

Population (2026-01-01)
  - Total: 410
  - Density: 76/km^{2} (200/sq mi)
- Time zone: UTC+1 (CET)
  - Summer (DST): UTC+2 (CEST)
- Postal codes: 789 73
- Website: www.obectrestina.cz

Třeština (German: Trittschein) is a municipality and village in Šumperk District in the Olomouc Region of the Czech Republic. It has about 400 inhabitants.

Třeština lies approximately 19 kilometres (12 mi) south of Šumperk, 32 km (20 mi) north-west of Olomouc, and 185 km (115 mi) east of Prague.

== Demographics ==
Historical population
Year	Pop.	±%
1869	373	—
1880	381	+2.1%
1890	401	+5.2%
1900	382	−4.7%
1910	442	+15.7%
1921	456	+3.2%
1930	475	+4.2%
1950	328	−30.9%
1961	356	+8.5%
1970	356	+0.0%
1980	372	+4.5%
1991	364	−2.2%
2001	357	−1.9%
2011	356	−0.3%
2021	394	+10.7%
Source: Censuses
