= Chakki River =

River in India

Coordinates: 32.0757°N 75.5827°E

The Chakki River is a tributary of the Beas River. It flows through the Indian states of Himachal Pradesh and Punjab and joins the Beas near Pathankot. It is fed by snow and rain in the Dhauladhar mountains.
