= Dalhousie Cantonment =

- Town
- Location in Himachal Pradesh, India Dalhousie Cantonment (India)
- Coordinates: 32.53°N 75.98°E
- Country: India
- State: Himachal Pradesh
- District: Chamba
- Elevation: 1,954 m (6,411 ft)

Population (2001)
  - Total: 1,962

Languages
  - Official: Hindi, Pahari
- Time zone: UTC+5:30 (IST)
- Vehicle registration: HP

Dalhousie cantonment is a town in Dalhousie, just 50 km from Chamba town in Chamba district in the state of Himachal Pradesh, India.

== History ==
In 1851, the British Government approached the Chamba State authorities to set up a sanatorium for Europeans. The state cooperated fully, and a site was chosen on the western edge of the Dhauladhar range by Colonel Napier (later Lord Napier of Magdala). After studying the climate, the Government approved the plan in 1853 and transferred five plateaux from Chamba State—Katalagh, Potrain, Terah, Bakrota, and Bhangor—for this purpose. In return, the annual tribute paid by Chamba was reduced by ₹2,000. On the recommendation of Sir Donald McLeod, the new sanatorium was named Dalhousie.

In the wake of the 1857 War, the Military Department of the Government of India, expanded its survey of lower Himalayas, to identify suitable locations for building "sanitaria and cantonments" for "quartering" British soldiers and military units. The move to locate cantonments in "cool and healthy hill stations" was justified on strategic and health grounds. In the following decade several cantonments, including in Balun (Dalhousie), Bakloh, Chakrata, Ranikhet, in the western lower Himalayas, were established. In 1863 it was decided that one third of the British troops in India should be located in the hill station cantonments. By the 1890s almost twenty five percent of the British troops in India were located in hill stations.

The Cantonment area in Dalhousie is called Baloon, also spelt as Balun. Dalhousie was first surveyed in 1853, and was acquired as a convalescent depot for European troops, in 1866, the same year as Bakloh was acquired as a Goorkha Cantonment, from the Raja of Chamba. In 1868, British troops moved into barracks in Baloon. By 1878 an 18 foot road connected the new cantonment to the plains.

In August 1954, during the Dalhousie centenary celebrations, Jawahar Lal Nehru, the prime minister of India, visited Baloon, Dalhousie Cantonment. He was accompanied by Lt General Kalwant Singh, General Officer Commanding in Chief, Western Command.

For administrative purposes, the cantonment came under Gurdaspur district until 1966. Under the Punjab Reorganisation Act of 1966, Dalhousie, along with Bakloh and Balun cantonments, was transferred to Chamba district of Himachal Pradesh.

== Cantonment Board ==
Dalhousie cantonment was established in 1867. It has been classified as a category IV Cantonment by Director General of Defence estates. The cantonment board, which is responsible for the management of the cantonment, consists of 4 members, including two elected members. Brig. JS Bhardwaj, Commander 323 Mountain Brigade, is the President of the Cantonment Board.

The cantonment board runs a primary school (24 students), a small hospital (two beds), and a guest house.

== Churches ==
There are four churches in Dalhousie. St. Andrew's Church and St. Patrick's Church, are located in Balun, Dalhousie Cantonment.

== Geography ==
Dalhousie is located at 32.53°N 75.98°E. It has an average elevation of 1954 metres (6410 feet).

=== Location ===
Dalhousie Cantonment is 485 km (301 mi) from Delhi, 52 km (32 mi) from Chamba, 23 km (14 mi) from Khajjiar, and 80 km (50 mi) from Pathankot, the closest railhead. The nearest airport is at Gaggal in Kangra, at a distance of 135 km (84 mi). Although there is an airport in Pathankot also but mostly flights are from Kangra.

== Demographics ==
According to the 2001 India census, Dalhousie cantonment had a population of 1962. Males constitute 56% of the population and females 44%. Dalhousie has an average literacy rate of 76%, higher than the national average of 65.38%. Male literacy is 79% and, female literacy is 72%. In Dalhousie, 14% of the population is under 6 years of age. Dalhousie is a very popular tourist destination with its most popular attraction is the Khajjiar Valley.
