= Bakloh =

- Cantonment
- Location in Himachal Pradesh, India Bakloh (India)
- Coordinates: 32.46549°N 75.925623°E
- Country: India
- State: Himachal Pradesh
- District: Chamba

Population (2011)
  - Total: 1,805

Languages
  - Official: Hindi
- Time zone: UTC+5:30 (IST)
- PIN: 176301
- Telephone code: 1899 (Chamba)
- Vehicle registration: HP 73 (Chamba)

Bakloh (or Bukloh (archaic spelling)) is a cantonment town. It is a hill station, 4584 feet above sea level, in Chamba district in the state of Himachal Pradesh, India.

== History ==
Bakloh and Balun, Dalhousie Cantonment, along with a sliver of territory to connect the two cantonments, was acquired in 1866 from the Raja of Chamba for a sum of rupees 5000. firstly Bakloh was meant for a 'Goorkha Cantonment' for the 4th Goorkha Regiment, raised at Pithoragarh uttar Pradesh in 1857. Balun, the cantonment in Dalhousie, was for British troops. Bakloh remained the home and the Regimental Center and Depot, of the 4th Gorkha Rifles, known as the 4th Prince of Wales Own Gurkha Rifles, for 82 years, from 1866 to 1948. 2/4 Gorkha Rifles was raised in Bakloh on 22 April 1886; 3/4 Gorkha Rifles on 15 November 1940; and 4/4 Gorkha Rifles on 15 March 1941. In 1934, the 5 km long cart track from Bakloh to Tannu Hatti, on the Dalhousie road, was converted into a motor-able road. The first car, belonging to Captain TDC Owens, arrived in Bakloh in the same year.

== 4 Gorkha Rifles in Bakloh ==
=== 4 GR Centre moves to Sabathu ===
In the wake of the Partition of India, in 1947, the regimental centres of the Indian Army were reorganized. The 4th Gorkha Rifles (GR) Regimental Center and Depot (GRRC) was shifted from Bakloh, first to Dharamshala, the Centre of the 1st Gorkha Rifles, and then to Chakrata, and finally to Sabathu, Shimla Hills. In Sabathu the 4th Gorkha Rifles Centre was merged with the 1st Gorkha Rifles Centre to become the First and Fourth Gorkha Training Centre (14 GTC).

In the wake of the move of the 4 GRRC from Bakloh to Sabathu, Indian Army Headquarters, in Delhi, on the prompting of senior officers of regiment, was "ready to consider" locating one battalion of the regiment in Bakloh to look after regimental pensioners, property, and widows. The idea, of reserving Bakloh for a battalion of the Regiment, however, did not find favour with many officers, including Commanding officers and "nothing came of it." The main objections raised against Bakloh being designated as reserved location for the Regiment was lack of educational facilities, and sources of "entertainment of big cities".

Following the move of the 4 GR Regimental Centre to Sabathu, Bakloh ceased to be exclusively a 4th Gorkha Rifles station. The Barracks, and Bungalows of 1/4 GR, and 2/4 GR, eponymously referred to as 1/4 and 2/4 lines, became peacetime locations for two battalion-sized units through which infantry units are rotated every two-three years.

=== Battalions in Bakloh ===
==== 3/4 GR ====
In 1948, 3/4 Gorkha Rifles (3/4 GR), which was in Jammu, was moved to Bakloh to occupy the spare accommodation in Bakloh, as the centre started to move out. While the Third Battalion (3/4GR) was in Bakloh, Maj General Walter David Alexander Lentaigne, CB, CBE, DSO, better known as "Joe" Lentaigne, who was then the Commandant of the Indian Defense Services Staff College, Wellington, Niligri hills, Tamil Nadu, and the Colonel of Regiment, 4 Gorkha Rifles, visited Bakloh on his farewell rounds and to be with the Third Battalion, which had served under him during the Burma campaign, as part of the Chindit Operations, in World War II. During the visit, he made a big impression on the young Indian Officers. While reviewing the Guard of Honor he spoke with the men in fluent Nepali, reminisced about the war in Burma, and recognized those who had served with him in the war by their names and, more impressively, by their regimental numbers.

==== 5/4 GR ====
The Fifth Battalion (5/4 GR) was raised in the 1/4 GR lines, Bakloh, in 1963, by Lt Colonel Ranjit Singh Chandel. The battalion, after three years in NEFA, returned to Bakloh for a second tenure in 1974. On 5 June 1976, Lt Colonel V Rajaram, formerly of 3/4 GR, succeeded Lt Colonel Jayant Pawar, as the commanding Officer. During its second tenure in Bakloh, the regimental reunion was held, in 1977. After the reunion, the battalion moved to Jammu and Kashmir in 1977. The reunion was attended by a large number of officers, junior commissioned officers and men, including many Indian and British officers who had served in Bakloh before the 4 GR Centre was shifted to Sabathu.

=== 4 Gorkha Rifle properties ===
The 4 GR owns several historical regimental properties in Bakloh. These include the 4 GR Memorial on the edge of the old 1/4 GR parade ground, Kharati lines, 1/4 GR and 2/4 GR widow's lines, mandirs, and the 19th century Sealy Bungalow, which briefly housed the regimental kindergarten, but is now in a state of neglect and disrepair. Senior officers of the regiment have suggested that it be converted into a holiday home.

The resident battalion of the regiment is expected to take care of the regiment's properties in Bakloh. In the absence of a battalion of the regiment, the Gorkha Sabha is expected to take care of these properties for which it receives a small supplement from the regiment. To ensure better care of these and other regimental 'remains' in Bakloh, it has been suggested that these be handed over to the Gorkha Sabha, Bakloh, for better upkeep.

=== Regimental memorial, Bakloh ===
A regimental memorial "To commemorate the relationship with Bakloh and 4 GR, ie the Home of the 4 Gorkhas" was constructed at the entrance of the parade ground, in 2003. The Cantonment Board, Bakloh, was given the responsibility for its upkeep and maintenance, by the General Officer Commanding, Mountain Division. Since then doubts have arisen on the commitment of the Cantonment Board to maintain the memorial, and it has been suggested that the Gorkha Sabha should be enlisted to ensure its care and security.

=== Regimental mandirs ===
Over the years 4 Gorkha Rifles has constructed several temples in Bakloh. The first temple, the 1/4 GR Mandir, was made by the 1/4 GR in the 19th century. In it are three deities- Shiva, Kali-ka, and Gorakh Nath. This Mandir is maintained by 1/4 GR and 5/4 GR. It was renovated in 2012. The first Pujari of 1/4 GR temple was Pandit Neel Kanth. In 1890, 2/4 GR constructed the Kali-ka mandir or 2/4 GR mandir. This temple is currently being maintained by the Gorkha Sabha, Bakloh. In 1923, the Gorkh Nath mandir was constructed. Gorakh Nath Mandir Re-constructed & By 2/4 GR Bn CO Col GS Batabyal, 2ic Lt Col Dinesh Sharma, construction Task by 2/4 GR Assalt PNR PL Cdr Sub Indra Bahadur Gurung and Unit jawans dt Jan to Apr 2000. Inaugurated by Bn CO Col GS Batabyal dt 18 Apr 2000. After Re-construction ... Gorakh Nath Mandir Visit Col 4GR Lt Gen Ashok Chakki ... July 2001. This is located on the way to Chilama.

==== Lokeshwar Mandir ====
Lokeshwar Mandir was inaugurated on Shivratri, 18 February 1947, in the presence of large number of people. The temple was inspired and designed by Agam Gurung. It was constructed in 1946 with local material, in the Nepal temple style, with three tier roof, by demobilised men waiting to be released after World War II. It is located on the path to Dalhousie, below the First Four Bazaar. The temple contain memorial plaques with names of those killed in World War II. Until the construction of the new regimental mandir in 2008, this was considered the main and the most sacred Regimental Mandir, in Bakloh, used for Sansari Pooja. The regiment's centenary pooja in 1957 was conducted in this mandir. It was maintained by annual contributions by battalions of the regiment. However, over the years, its upkeep was neglected. It lost patrons because of, amongst other reasons, its relative remoteness. 2/4 GR after it returned from the United Nations Interim Force in Lebanon (UNIFIL), in 2000, carried out repairs and renovation of Shri Guru Gorakhnath Mandir. The repair and renovation was led by Subedar Major Dhan Bahadur Rana, and executed by Pioneer/Assault Platoon Commander Subedar Indra Bahadur Gurung. The renovated mandir was inaugurated by Col G S Batabyal, CO 2/4 GR in April 2000.

==== 4GR Gorakh Nath Regimental Mandir ====
Despite the many regimental mandirs in Bakloh, in May 2007, it was decided by the Colonel of the Regiment and the Centre Commandant, to construct yet another mandir. The new mandir, designated as 4GR Gorakh Nath Regimental Mandir, was constructed in four months from December 2007 to April 2008, under the supervision of Mr Swaminathan, from Tamil Nadu, and Naib Subedar Sher Bahadur Thapa, who was awarded a 'Commendation Card' by the Army Commander for his work in constructing the new mandir. The new mandir is located above and on the right of the Kalimata mandir. The new regimental mandir was formally inaugurated on 22 April 2008, with much fan-fare, by Lt Gen TK Sapru, GOC in C Western Command, in the presence of all the Commanding Officers, Subedar-Majors, and religious teachers of the Regiment.

==== Annual Shobha Yatra ====
Every year in April a Shobha yatra, in which large number of ex-servicemen participate, starts from the Guru Gorakh Nath Mandir. The yatra goes around Bakloh, covering a distance of approximately 10 kilometers. From 19 to 22 April each year Puja, is conducted at the Guru Gorakh Nath Mandir, the Sansari Mandir, and the Kali Mata Mandir. On the last day of the puja program a combined Regimental puja is held in Guru Gorakh Nath Mandir. The format for the Pooja celebrations is issued by the Commandant 14 GTC as a Standing Operating Procedure. In addition to ex-servicemen, small puja contingents from each of the five battalions and the 14 GTC also participate in the event. These celebrations are followed by a barakhana for ex-servicemen and their families.

== Cantonment Board ==
Bakloh Cantonment was established in 1866. It is category IV Cantonment. The board consists of four members, including two elected members.

== Gorkha Sabha, Bakloh ==
The Gorkha Sabha was established in 1933. The Sabha for want of office space and patronage, after a year or so of existence, became dormant. In 1953 under the presidency of Honorary Lieutenant Babar Singh, SB, OBI, it was revived. In 2008, the Sabha celebrated its Platinum Jubilee.

=== Organisation ===
Majority of the Gorkha pensioners in Bakloh are from the 4th Gorkha Rifles. The Gorkha Sabha, Bakloh, is a representative body of all Gorkhas in Bakloh, including Gorkha Ex-servicemen (ESM) and their dependents. The Gorkha Sabha, is a 'sister' organization of the Himachal Pradesh Gorkha Ex-Serviceman's Welfare Association, Bakloh. The Gorkha Sabha, Bakloh, has close relations with the Gorkha Sabha, Dharamshala, and the Himachal and Punjab Gorkha Association, Dharamshala, the only other Gorkha ESM welfare association in HP. The HP Gorkha Ex-Serviceman's Welfare Association, Bakloh, is registered with and part of the All India Ex-Serviceman's Welfare Association (AIGEWA), Dehradun. Presently The Gorkha Sabha Bakloh houses in an old Regimental building which was once a NCO club of 4GR.

=== Presidents ===
The first president was of the Gorkha Sabha Bakloh was Captain Ranu Thapa. The Gorkha Sabha since its inception in 1933 has had 19 Presidents. Subedar Major and Honorary Captain Gagan Singh, Gurung, was elected as President of the Sabha on 31 December 2011. He was succeeded in 2012 by Hony Lieutenant Vijay Kumar Gurung, 8 GR.

=== Membership ===
In 2013 the Gorka Sabha had 483 members. They belonged to 14 regiments and Corps of the Indian army as follows: 1 GR 30, 3 GR 5, 4 GR 374, 8 GR 10, 9 GR 4, 11 GR 5, Garhwal Rifles 2, Jammu and Kashmir Rifles 20, EME 4, Parachute regiment 5, Signal Regiment 3, Corps of Military police 2, and Intelligence Corps 5.

=== Functions and expectations ===
- The President of the Gorkha Sabha, Bakloh, as representative and voice of all gorkha pensioners and their dependents in Bakloh, interfaces with the regiment, 14 Gorkha Training Centre, the five battalions of the 4GR, and the 4 Gorkha Rifles Officers Association, UK.
- The President of the Gorkha Sabha, as head of all ex-servicemen in Bakloh, is responsible for taking up the causes and interests of the Bakloh pensioners and their dependents with the AIGEWA, and other civic and government bodies. The President of the Gorkha Sabha, attends the Annual General Body meeting of the AIGEWA, and participates in the election of its president.
- The Gorkha Sabha is also expected to represent the Regiment in Bakloh, and take care of its properties and interests. The Gorkha Sabha, Bakloh, receives assistance and grants from the 4 Gorkha Rifles, for the upkeep of regimental properties in Bakloh.
- The President of the Gorkha Sabha writes an annual report, titled News From Bakloh, which is published in the 4 Gorkha Rifles Officers Association News letter. The News from Bakloh usually carries a brief account of the work of the Gorkha Sabha, the activities of its members, and its concerns. In the News from Bakloh, for 2012, the President of the Sabha, noted that ‘ Bakloh has been forgotten’ by the regiment, and that "Bakloh is developing well day by day".

The Gorkha Sabha leadership has often been faulted for lack of leadership, particularly in motivating pensioners to participate in self-help community projects; mobilizing funds for its activities; and tardiness in the upkeep and securing of regimental properties. A former Commanding Officer of 2/4 Gorkha Rifles, in 2011, wrote, that his attempts in the 1980s to "improve the ‘conditions of ex servicemen'" did not make headway and that pensioners were "reluctant to tread fresh ground and were unwilling to undertake any projects." Another senior officer of the Regiment, in 2011, observed that the Gorkha Sabha is a divided house with "various stake holders (from different regiments pulling in different directions)", and that the "present avatar of Gorkha Sabha is mostly on a 'begging bowl mode'."

=== Aims and objectives ===
The Gorkha Sabha receives financial assistance from the Government of India for welfare activities which includes providing Stipends and scholarship to deserving dependents of ex servicemen; and conducting coaching classes and vocational training, in various fields. In addition, it interfaces with respective record offices to resolve pension problems, secure financial assistance from the AIGEWA, and the Zila Sainik board in Chamba, and arrange to issue of canteen and ECHS smart cards.

== Schools ==
The first school in Bakloh was established by the 4the Gurkha Rifles Centre and Depot for imparting education to soldiers, recruits, and children of soldiers and pensioners. In 1877 the 4 Gurkhas Regimental School, had 56 students. The Inspector of Education, in that year, in his annual report, noted that the progress was ‘not very satisfactory’, and that improvement was expected after the return of the Master who had been sent to Umballa, for ‘a course of instruction in the Military Normal School. Even after the 4th GR Centre moved from Bakloh to Sabathu, battalions of the regiment, whenever located in Bakloh, as a matter of course, have run primary school for the children of soldiers, and dependents of pensioners. This tradition has been continued by units of other regiments. In 2012, 18 Dogras was running a primary school, till class 5.

=== Kendriya Vidyalaya ===
On the army's urging the Kendriya Vidyalaya Sangathan opened a Kendriya Vidyalaya (central school), affiliated to Central Board of Secondary Education, in Bakloh Cantonment, in October 1982. The school has classes 1 through 12. The chairman of the school is Commander 323 Mountain Brigade. The Kendriya Vidyalaya Bakloh got its own new building after an interval of 32 odd years on 16 February 2014. It is a prestigious Institute of Bakloh and has more than 400 students enrolled presently(2020)

=== Senior Secondary School Kakira ===
Government Senior Secondary School, affiliated to the Himachal Pradesh Board of Education Dharmshala (HPBOSE), is located in Kakira, Chamba (HP). It has a large building and a big ground, which makes it a hub for various activities for the surrounding villages & towns. the foundation of this school is put by Shri Harigiri ji. Before that this school is located at Lal Barag currently known as 1/4 Bakloh near military hospital Bakloh. This school had a great history. Till now GSSS Kakira has provided true gems to this nation. Many of them are scientists, Soldiers, Army officers and many more. Many of them had participated in kargil war (1999).

== Demography ==
The population of Bakloh in 1881, was 1479 (1300 Hindus, 13 Sikhs, 154 Muslims, and 12 others). 120 years later, in 2001, according to the official census, the population was 1810; with an unexplained, adverse gender ratio of 55 percent male and 45 percent female. The overall average literacy at 83% is higher than the national average of 59.5%.

== Tourism ==
Bakloh has a temperate climate, trekking tracks, colonial era-buildings, historic bazaars, and temples, though it gets few visitors. It was formerly frequented by British officers.

== See also ==
- The Fifth Battalion the Fourth Gorkha Rifles
- 4 Gorkha Rifles
