= Syria–Lebanon campaign order of battle =

This is the order of battle for the Syria–Lebanon campaign, a World War II campaign between the Western Allies and Vichy France during June and July, 1941.

== Allied forces ==
Commander-in-Chief Middle East Command: General Sir Archibald Wavell
General Officer Commanding Palestine and Trans-Jordan: General Sir H. Maitland Wilson

=== South Syria and Lebanon – Australian I Corps (from 18 June) ===
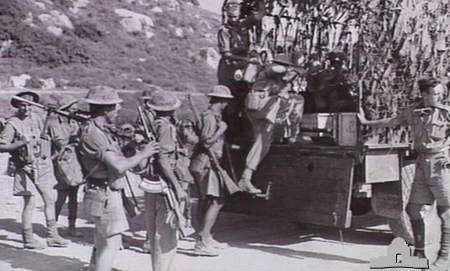
Australian troops from the 2/14th Infantry Battalion

General Officer Commanding I Corps: Lieutenant-General John Lavarack

- Australian 7th Division – Major-General John Lavarack (until 18 June) then Major-General Arthur "Tubby" Allen
  - Divisional Troops
    - 6th Division Cavalry
    - 9th Division Cavalry
    - 2/3rd Machine Gun Battalion
    - The Royal Scots Greys and The Staffordshire Yeomanry (composite mechanised regiment detached from British 1st Cavalry Division)
    - One squadron, The Royals (detached from 1st Cavalry Division )
    - C battalion Special Service Brigade (commandos based in Cyprus for seaborne landings)
  - Artillery (Brigadier F. H. Berryman)
    - 2/4th Field Regiment
    - 2/5th Field Regiment
    - 2/6th Field Regiment
    - 2/2nd Anti-tank Regiment
    - 57 Light Anti-aircraft Regiment
  - 21st Australian Brigade (Brigadier J E S Stevens)
    - 2/14th Infantry Battalion
    - 2/16th Infantry Battalion
    - 2/27th Infantry Battalion
  - 25th Australian Brigade (Brigadier A. R. Baxter-Cox until 22 June, Brigadier E.C.P. Plant thereafter))
    - 2/25th Infantry Battalion
    - 2/31st Infantry Battalion
    - 2/33rd Infantry Battalion
  - 17th Australian Brigade (from 28 June) (Brigadier S. G. Savige)
    - 2/3rd Infantry Battalion
    - 2/5th Infantry Battalion
    - 2/2nd Pioneer Battalion
- 'Gentforce' (command activated 12 June until 18 June) – Major-General P L Legentilhomme (wounded 12 June and succeeded by Brigadier W. L. Lloyd until 18 June)
- British 6th Infantry Division (activated 18 June) – Major-General J. F. Evetts
  - British 16th Infantry Brigade (Brigadier C. E. N. Lomax) from 20 June
    - 2nd Battalion, King's Own Royal Regiment
    - 2nd Battalion, Leicestershire Regiment
    - 2nd Battalion, Queen's Royal Regiment
  - British 23rd Infantry Brigade (Brigadier A. Galloway) from 29 June
    - 1st Battalion, Durham Light Infantry
    - Czechoslovak 11th Infantry Battalion
    - 4th Battalion, Border Regiment
  - 5th Indian Infantry Brigade (Brigadier W L Lloyd) (Lieut.-Col. L. B. Jones of 4/6th Rajputana Rifles while Lloyd commanded Gentforce)
    - 1st Battalion, Royal Fusiliers
    - 3/1st Punjab Regiment
    - 4/6th Rajputana Rifles
    - 18th Field Company Bombay Sappers and Miners
    - 1st Field Regiment, Royal Artillery
- 1st Free French Light Division – Major-General Paul Legentilhomme
  - 1st Free French Brigade (Colonel Cazaud)
    - 1st Battalion of Foreign Legion
    - 1 March Battalion
    - 3 March Battalion
  - 2nd Free French Brigade (Colonel Genin)
    - 1st Battalion of Marine infantry
    - 2 March Battalion
    - 4 March Battalion
  - 1st battalion of Naval Fusiliers
  - 1st Moroccan Spahis group of squadron
  - 1st battery field artillery (4 75 mm guns)
  - 1st company of tanks (9 H39 tanks)
- Circassian Cavalry group of squadrons (453 troops) (Colonel Collet)

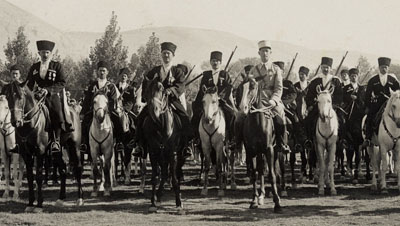
Circassian troops with a French officer

=== Northern Syria ===
Elements of Iraqforce:

==== Advancing on the Euphrates ====
- 10th Indian Infantry Division – Major-General W J Slim
  - 13th Duke of Connaught's Own Lancers
  - 157th Field Regiment RA
  - 21st Indian Infantry Brigade (Brigadier C.J. Weld)
    - 2/10th Gurkha Rifles
    - 2/4th Gurkha Rifles
    - 4/13th Frontier Force Rifles
  - 25th Indian Infantry Brigade (Brigadier R Mountain)
    - 1/5th Mahratta Light Infantry
    - 2/11th Sikh Regiment
    - 3/9th Jat Regiment
    - 2/8th Gurkha Rifles (detached from 20th Indian Infantry Brigade)

==== In northern Iraq and the "Duck's Bill" region of Syria ====
Under command of HQ British Troops Iraq: Lieutenant-General Sir Edward Quinan

- 20th Indian Infantry Brigade (detached from 10th Indian Infantry Division) (Brigadier D Powell)
  - 2/7th Gurkha Rifles
  - 3/11th Sikh Regiment
- 17th Indian Infantry Brigade (detached from 8th Indian Infantry Division) (Brigadier Douglas Gracey)
  - 1/12th Frontier Force Regiment
  - 5/13th Frontier Force Rifles

==== In central Syria ====
- Habforce commanded by Major-General J.G.W. Clark
  - British 4th Cavalry Brigade of the British 1st Cavalry Division (Brigadier J.J. Kingstone until 24 June, Brigadier J G E Tiarks from 29 June)
    - Household Cavalry Regiment
    - North Somerset Yeomanry
    - Royal Wiltshire Yeomanry
  - 1st Battalion of the Essex Regiment
  - Arab Legion Mechanised Regiment
  - 237th Battery, Royal Artillery (60th Field Regiment)
  - An Australian battery of 2-pounder anti-tank guns (detached from the 2/1st Anti-Tank Regiment)
  - 169th Light Anti-aircraft Battery

== Vichy French forces ==
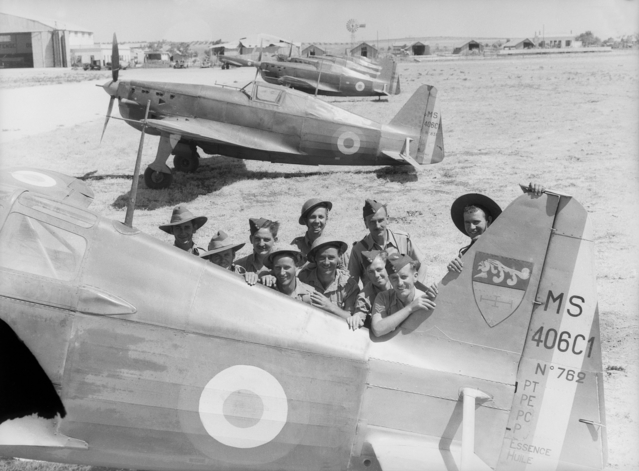
French MS 406 fighters in Syria

The Army of the Levant (Armée du Levant) identifies the armed forces of France and then Vichy France which occupied a portion of the "Levant" during the "interwar period" and early World War II. In 1920, the French were given a mandate over Syria and Lebanon by the League of Nations. During this period of time, Syria was known as the French Mandate of Syria and Lebanon was known as the French Mandate of Lebanon.

- South Lebanon Sector
  - Saïda Sub-Sector
    - III/22nd Algerian Tirailleur Regiment
    - I/Colonial Artillery Regiment of the Levant
    - I/8th Algerian Spahi Regiment
    - II/22nd Algerian Tirailleur Regiment
    - I/29th Algerian Tirailleur Regiment
    - I/6th African Chasseur Regiment
    - IV/6th Foreign Legion Regiment
    - I/24th Mixed Colonial Infantry Regiment
    - Foreign Legion Levant Artillery Battalion
  - Merdjayoun Sub-Sector
    - II/29th Algerian Tirailleur Regiment
    - I/22nd Algerian Tirailleur Regiment
    - 1st Lebanese Chasseur Battalion
    - II/Colonial Artillery Regiment of the Levant
- South Syria Sector
  - Direct sector control
    - 1st Metropolitan Artillery Regiment of the Levant
    - III/17th Senegalese Tirailleur Regiment
  - Hauran Sub-Sector
    - II/17th Senegalese Tirailleur Regiment
  - L'Hermon Sub-Sector
    - I/17th Senegalese Tirailleur Regiment
  - Sector Reserve
    - V/1st Moroccan Tirailleur Regiment
    - III/29th Algerian Tirailleur Regiment
    - I/16th Tunisian Tirailleur Regiment
    - III/16th Tunisian Tirailleur Regiment
    - II/24th Mixed Colonial Infantry Regiment
    - III/24th Mixed Colonial Infantry Regiment
- Levant Cavalry
  - 1st Moroccan Spahi Regiment
  - 2nd March (provisional) Spahi Regiment
  - 6th African Chasseur Regiment
  - 7th African Chasseur Regiment
  - Special Cavalry (Three companies of Méhariste, two companies of Druze, eight various companies stationed in Syria, and 20 companies of Circassians)
- Forces in central Lebanon, mid- to late-June 1941
  - Task Force Albord
    - I/22nd Algerian Tirailleur Regiment
    - II/29th Algerian Tirailleur Regiment
    - 1st Lebanese Chasseur Battalion
    - III/6th Foreign Legion Regiment
    - II/16th Tunisian Tirailleur Regiment
  - Task Force Barré
    - I/6th Foreign Legion Regiment
    - II/17th Senegalese Tirailleur Regiment
    - III/17th Senegalese Tirailleur Regiment
    - Alep Special Artillery Battalion
    - Spahi Cavalry Battalion
  - Lehr-Olive Detachments
    - I/6th African Chasseur Regiment
    - II/24th Colonial Infantry Mixed Regiment
  - Task Force Rougie
    - II/16th Tunisian Tirailleur Regiment, later replaced by the II/22nd Algerian Tirailleur Regiment
    - II/6th Foreign Legion Regiment

== Sources ==
- Gaujac, Paul (1984). "Chapter II". L'Armée de la Victoire: Le réarmement, 1942–43. Les Grandes batailles de France (in French). Vol. I. Paris: Éditions Lavauzelle. ISBN 2-7025-0055-2.
- Long, Gavin (1953). "Chapters 16–26". Greece, Crete and Syria. Official Histories – Second World War. Vol. II (1st ed.). Canberra: Australian War Memorial. Archived from the original on 2007-06-07.
- Mackenzie, Compton (1951). Eastern Epic. London: Chatto & Windus. OCLC 1412578.
- McKenzie-Smith, Graham (2018). The Unit Guide: The Australian Army 1939–1945, Volume 3. Warriewood, New South Wales: Big Sky Publishing. ISBN 978-1-925675-146.
- Playfair, Major-General ISO; Stitt, Commander GMS; Molony, Brigadier CJC & Toomer, Air Vice-Marshal SE (2004) [(HMSO) 1954]. Butler, JRM (ed.). Mediterranean and Middle East: The Early Successes Against Italy (to May 1941). History of the Second World War, United Kingdom Military Series. Vol. I. Uckfield: Naval & Military Press. ISBN 1-84574-065-3.
- Playfair, Major-General ISO; Flynn, Captain FC (RN); Molony, Brigadier CJC & Toomer, Air Vice-Marshal SE (2004) [(HMSO) 1956]. Butler, JRM (ed.). The Mediterranean and Middle East: The Germans come to the help of their Ally (1941). History of the Second World War, United Kingdom Military Series. Vol. II. Uckfield: Naval & Military Press. ISBN 1-84574-066-1.
- Rikhye, Ravi (2002). "British and Imperial Forces in the Allied Invasion of Syria and Lebanon: Initial Forces, June 8, 1941" (PDF). orbat.com. Archived from the original (PDF) on 2008-11-22.
- Stehlík, Eduard (2009). The Heart of the Army, General Staff 1919–2009. Prague: Ministerstvo obrany České republiky. p. 46. ISBN 978-80-7278-516-2.
