= Iraqforce =

WW2 British and Commonwealth formation

Iraqforce was a British and Commonwealth formation that came together in the Kingdom of Iraq. The formation fought in the Middle East during World War II.

== Background ==
During World War I, the British Army defeated the Ottoman Army in the Middle East during the Mesopotamian Campaign. Subsequently, the League of Nations designated Mesopotamia as the British Mandate of Mesopotamia. From 1920 to the early 1930s, RAF Iraq Command was created as an inter-service command in charge of all British forces in the mandate-controlled Kingdom of Iraq and was commanded by an RAF officer normally of Air Vice-Marshal rank.

In 1932, the British mandate in Iraq ended and according to the Anglo-Iraqi Treaty of 1930, the United Kingdom was permitted to maintain troops in Iraq. In 1933 or 1934, RAF Iraq Command was renamed the British Forces in Iraq. By the late 1930s, these forces were restricted to two Royal Air Force stations, RAF Shaibah near Basra, RAF Habbaniya west of Baghdad and RAF Basrah (the supplies base on the banks of the Shatt al-Arab)

On 1 April 1941, during World War II, Rashid Ali seized power in Iraq via a coup d'état. Ali was supported by three senior Royal Iraqi Army officers and one Royal Iraqi Air Force officer, known as the Golden Square. Rashid Ali proclaimed himself Chief of the National Defence Government. His new government was immediately recognised by Nazi Germany; it was openly pro-Nazi and anti-British.

=== Nomenclature ===
The ground forces from India that landed in Basra were initially known as Sabine Force (Major-General William Fraser). From 8 May 1941, Fraser was replaced and the forces in Basra were commanded by Lieutenant-General Edward Quinan. On 18 June, Quinan was placed in command of all ground forces in Iraq which included Sabine Force and British Forces in Iraq as Iraqforce. From 21 June, Iraqforce was called Iraq Command. On 1 September 1941, after Persia (modern Iran) was invaded, Iraq Command was renamed "Persia and Iraq Force" (PAI Force). PAI Force was still commanded by Quinan and he still reported to India Command. Iraqforce was variously responsible to GHQ India, Middle East Command and then Persia and Iraq Command.

=== Prelude ===
Sabine Force was despatched from Karachi by GHQ India to seize the port of Basra and to supplement the British Forces in Iraq at RAF Shaibah and RAF Habbaniya. British Prime Minister Winston Churchill saw Basra as a major supply base in the future for material from the United States. Churchill did not recognise Rashid Ali's "National Defence Government" as legitimate. Churchill also wanted to reinstate a more compliant Iraqi government and to protect British interests in Iraq, notably the oilfields of which the British-owned Anglo-Persian Oil Company was concession holder. On 18 April, a brigade from Karachi landed and captured Basra; on 30 April, a second brigade arrived. The Rashid Ali government demanded that the British forces be removed from Iraq and Iraqi forces took up positions around RAF Habbaniya. On 2 May, British aircraft from Habbaniya launched a surprise attack on Iraqi forces throughout the country.

== Military operations ==
=== Anglo-Iraqi War ===
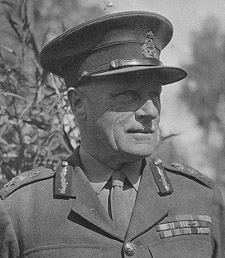
Lieutenant-General Quinan in Iraq

During the ensuing war, a force from the British Mandate of Palestine, known as Habbaniya Force (shortened to Habforce), advanced into Iraq from Transjordan. Habforce, with Kingcol in the lead, was to relieve the British garrison forces besieged at the Royal Air Force treaty base at RAF Habbaniya. The threat to Habbaniya was removed by actions of the garrison before any elements of Habforce arrived. After it arrived, Habforce and a portion of the Habbaniya garrison then advanced through Fallujah to capture Baghdad. By 31 May, an armistice had been signed and the government collapsed. From early May, the troops in Iraq were under the operational control of Army Headquarters, Middle East Command in Cairo, reverting to India command on 18 June. From 21 June, Iraqforce became known as the Iraq Command.

=== Syria-Lebanon Campaign ===
In June and July 1941, after Iraq was secured, elements of Iraqforce/Iraq Command took part in the Syria–Lebanon campaign and, while active in Syria, they once more came under the authority of the Cairo Headquarters.

=== Anglo-Soviet Invasion of Persia ===
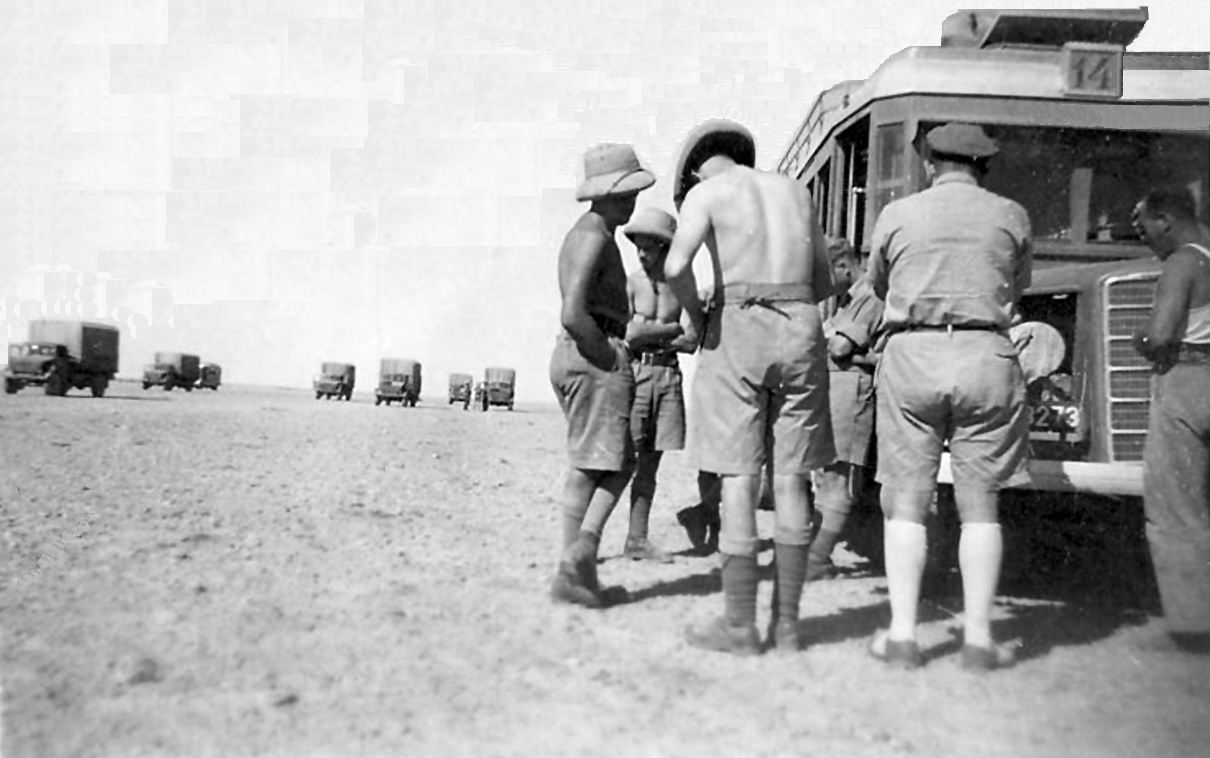
British trucks near Baghdad, 1943

In late August 1941, Iraq Command conducted the Anglo-Soviet invasion of Persia, in conjunction with forces advancing from the Soviet Union. A new formation, Hazelforce, based on the 2nd Indian Armoured Brigade was formed within Iraq Command during this effort. On 1 September, after Persia (modern Iran) was secured, Iraq Command was renamed "Persia and Iraq Force" or Paiforce. Paiforce was still commanded by Quinan and he still reported to India Command. In January 1942, Persia and Iraq once again came under Middle East Command and, in February 1942, Quinan's headquarters was re-designated as Tenth Army.

In 1942, with the growing threat from the German advance in the Caucasus, it was felt that the area should come under a General Headquarters which could bring a specific focus to the area. Previous experience of controlling the area from Cairo and Delhi had not proved ideal and both these General Headquarters were by this time fully committed in the Western Desert Campaign and to the Burma Campaign respectively. In August 1942, it was decided therefore, as part of the changes made bringing in Alexander and Montgomery to Middle East Command and Auchinleck to India Command, to create a new Persia and Iraq Command, to be led by General Sir Maitland Wilson and based in Baghdad.

== Orders of battle ==
=== Iraq, May 1941 ===
Commanded by Major-General William Fraser (until 8 May). Lieutenant-General Edward Quinan (from 8 May).

- 10th Indian Infantry Division - Major-General W.A.K. Fraser (until 16 May). Major-General William Slim (from 16 May).
  - 13th Duke of Connaught's Own Lancers (reconnaissance regiment in armoured cars)
  - 3rd Field Regiment Royal Artillery
  - 32nd Field Regiment Royal Artillery
  - 157th Field Regiment Royal Artillery
  - 20th Indian Infantry Brigade (Note: The brigade landed at Basra on 18 April.)- Brigadier Donald Powell
    - 2nd battalion 8th Gurkha Rifles
    - 2nd battalion 7th Gurkha Rifles
    - 3rd battalion 11th Sikh Regiment
  - 21st Indian Infantry Brigade (Note: Playfair related that the brigade landed at Basra on 30 April but Wavell wrote that the brigade arrived on 7 May at the same time as the 10th Indian Division HQ and Lieutenant-General Quinan and his Force HQ.)- Brigadier Charles Weld
    - 4th battalion 13th Frontier Force Rifles (Note: Included two troops of Rolls-Royce armoured cars.)
    - 2nd battalion 4th Gurkha Rifles
    - 2nd battalion 10th Gurkha Rifles
  - 25th Indian Infantry Brigade (Note: The brigade landed at Basra on 30 May.) - Brigadier Ronald Mountain
    - 3rd battalion 9th Jat Regiment
    - 2nd Royal battalion 11th Sikh Regiment
    - 1st battalion 5th Mahratta Light Infantry
- Ground Forces at RAF Habbaniya - Air Vice-Marshal Harry Smart (until 5 May). Colonel Ouvry Roberts (from 5 May).
  - 1st battalion The King's Own Royal Regiment (Lancaster) (Note: Battalion landed at RAF Shaibah on 17 April. The battalion was transferred by air to RAF Habbaniya on 24 April.)
  - 1,200 Assyrian and Iraqi Levies - Lieutenant-Colonel J. A. Brawn
  - Number 1 Armoured Car Company RAF (Note: 18 RAF armoured cars. Company included 18 Rolls-Royce armoured cars and two ancient tanks.)
- Habforce commanded by Major-General John Clark
  - Mechanized squadron of the Transjordan Frontier Force - Refused to enter Iraq and were disarmed.
  - Detachment of the Arab Legion (Note: This detachment of the Arab Legion consisted of three mechanised squadrons and was around 400 men strong.) - John Glubb "Glubb Pasha" (Note: The Arab Legion initially advanced ahead of Kingcol. The Legionnaires were ostensibly the personal escort of Glubb Pasha.)
  - Striking force Kingcol - Brigadier James Kingstone
    - 4th Cavalry Brigade - Lieutenant-Colonel Andrew Ferguson
      - Composite Household Cavalry Regiment
      - The Warwickshire Yeomanry
      - The Royal Wiltshire Yeomanry
    - 237th Battery 60th Field Regiment, Royal Artillery (Note: Equipped with 25 Pounders.)
    - A & D Companies, 1st Battalion Essex Regiment - Major K. F. May - Accompanied by two Bren gun carriers. Personnel carried in transport of the Royal Army Service Corps.
    - One anti-tank troop, Royal Artillery (Note: Equipped with 2 Pounders.)
    - Number 2 Armoured Car Company RAF (Note: 8 Royal Air Force armoured cars. Company included 8 Fordson armoured cars.)
    - Two supply companies, Royal Army Service Corps
  - Main Body - Lieutenant-Colonel John Nichols, MC
    - Headquarters 1st Cavalry Division (elements)
    - 1st Battalion Essex Regiment (Note: Minus two companies.)
    - 60th Field Regiment, Royal Artillery (Note: Minus one battery and equipped with 25 Pounders.)
    - One Battery of anti-tank guns, Royal Artillery (Note: Minus one troop and equipped with 2 Pounders.)

Formed from existing units in early June:

- Gocol - R. E. S. Gooch
- Mercol - E. J. H. Merry
- Harcol - R. J. Hardy

Arriving At Basra on 9 June:

- 17th Indian Infantry Brigade (detached from 8th Indian Infantry Division) - Brigadier Douglas Gracey
  - 1st Battalion Royal Fusiliers
  - 1st Battalion (Prince of Wales Own Sikhs) 12th Frontier Force Regiment
  - 1st Battalion 5th Royal Gurkha Rifles

Arriving at Basra on 16 June:

- 24th Indian Infantry Brigade - Brigadier Roger Le Fleming
  - 2nd Battalion 6th Rajputana Rifles
  - The Kumaon Rifles
  - 5th Battalion 5th Mahratta Light Infantry

=== Syria: June–July 1941 ===
Commanded by Lieutenant General Edward Quinan

During the Syria–Lebanon Campaign Iraqforce consisted of:

- 10th Indian Infantry Division -Major-General William Slim
  - 20th Indian Infantry Brigade - Brigadier Donald Powell
  - 21st Indian Infantry Brigade - Brigadier C. J. Weld
  - 25th Indian Infantry Brigade - Brigadier Ronald Mountain
- 17th Indian Infantry Brigade (detached from 8th Indian Infantry Division) - Brigadier Douglas Gracey
- Habforce - Major-General J. G. W. Clark
  - 4th Cavalry Brigade - Brigadier J. J. Kingstone
  - 1st Battalion The Essex Regiment
  - Arab Legion Mechanized Regiment
  - 237th Battery 60th Field Regiment, Royal Artillery
  - An Australian battery of 2 pounder anti-tank guns
  - 169th Light Anti-aircraft Battery

=== Iran: August–September 1941 ===
Commanded by Lieutenant General Edward Quinan

During the Anglo-Soviet invasion of Persia (Iran) Iraqforce was renamed Paiforce, consisting of:

- 10th Indian Infantry Division - Major-General William Slim (took overall command of the ground forces)
- 8th Indian Infantry Division - commanded by Major-General Charles Harvey
  - 18th Indian Infantry Brigade - Brigadier Rupert Lochner
  - 19th Indian Infantry Brigade - Brigadier Charles Ford
  - 24th Indian Infantry Brigade (until 11 September) - Brigadier Roger Le Fleming
  - 25th Indian Infantry Brigade (detached from 10th Indian Infantry Division) - Brigadier Ronald Mountain
  - 13th Duke of Connaught's Own Lancers
- Hazelforce - Brigadier John Aizlewood
  - 2nd Indian Armoured Brigade Group - Brigadier John Aizlewood
  - 9th Armoured Brigade (formerly the 4th Cavalry Brigade) - Brigadier John Currie
  - 21st Indian Infantry Brigade (detached from 10th Indian Infantry Division) - Brigadier C. J. Weld
- 6th Indian Infantry Division (from 11 September) - Major-General James Thomson
  - 17th Queen Victoria's Own Cavalry (Poona Horse)
  - 27th Indian Infantry Brigade - Brigadier Alan Blaxland
  - 24th Indian Infantry Brigade (transferred from 8th Indian Infantry Division) - Brigadier Roger Le Fleming

== See also ==
- RAF Iraq Command
- Tenth Army (United Kingdom)
- 1941 Iraqi coup d'état

== Notes ==
Footnotes

Citations
