= Battle of Gazala =

1942 battle during the Western Desert Campaign of World War II

- Part of the Western Desert campaign of the Second World War
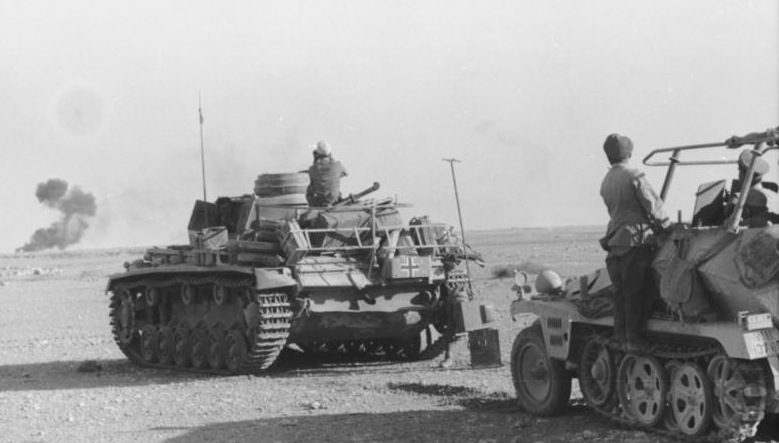
- Panzer III and Rommel's command vehicle during the Battle of Gazala.
| Date | 26 May – 21 June 1942 (3 weeks and 5 days) |
| Location | Gazala, near Tobruk, Libya 31°57′N 23°27′E |
| Result | Axis victory |
| Territorial changes | Northeastern Marmarica recaptured by Axis forces. |

Belligerents
| Italy; Germany | United Kingdom: India; South Africa; Free France; Supported by: United States (Note: A volunteer squadron of three M3 Grants from the American 1st Armored Division under Major Henry Cabot Lodge Jr. were placed under British command and achieved a number of victories during fighting near Acroma on 11 June. Time recorded these as the first Americans to engage German land forces in the war.) |

Commanders and leaders
| (Kingdom of Italy) Ettore Bastico (Nazi Germany) Erwin Rommel (Nazi Germany) Walter Nehring (Nazi Germany) Ludwig Crüwell (Note: General Albert Kesselring, in temporary command after Crüwell was captured by the British on 29 May.) (Kingdom of Italy) Ettore Baldassarre (Kingdom of Italy) Enea Navarini (Kingdom of Italy) Benvenuto Gioda | (United Kingdom) Claude Auchinleck (United Kingdom) Neil Ritchie (United Kingdom) William Gott (United Kingdom) Charles Norrie |

Units involved
| Panzerarmee Afrika / Gruppo Corazzato Africa | Eighth Army |

Strength
| 90,000 men (60,000 Italian, 30,000 German); 560 tanks (228 Italian); 542 aircraft | 110,000 men 843 tanks 604 aircraft |

Casualties and losses
| German: 3,360 men (26 May – 24 June) (Note: 300 officers, 570 NCOs and 2,490 other ranks.); 400 armoured vehicles damaged or destroyed Italian: 3,000 men 125 tanks 44 armoured cars 39 guns 74 anti-tank guns 450 motor vehicles | 50,000 killed, wounded or captured (incl. c. 33,000 prisoners at Tobruk) (Note: 19,000 British, 10,720 South African and 2,500 Indian troops.); 1,188 armoured vehicles damaged or destroyed |
- Many damaged tanks were returned to action by both sides.

The Battle of Gazala, also the Gazala Offensive (Italian: Battaglia di Ain el-Gazala; German: Schlacht von Gazala), was fought near the village of Gazala during the Western Desert Campaign of the Second World War, west of the port of Tobruk in Libya, from 26 May to 21 June 1942. Axis troops consisting of German (Panzerarmee Afrika; Generaloberst Erwin Rommel) and Italian units fought the British Eighth Army (General Sir Claude Auchinleck, also Commander-in-Chief Middle East) composed mainly of British Commonwealth, Indian and Free French troops.

The Axis troops made a decoy attack in the north as the main attack (Operation Venezia) moved round the southern flank of the Gazala position. Unexpected resistance at the south end of the line around the Bir Hakeim box by the Free French garrison left the Panzerarmee Afrika with a long and vulnerable supply route around the Gazala Line. Rommel retired to a defensive position backing onto Allied minefields (the Cauldron), forming a base in the midst of the British defences. Italian engineers lifted mines from the west side of the minefields to create a supply route through to the Axis side.

Operation Aberdeen, an attack by the Eighth Army to finish off the Panzerarmee, was poorly co-ordinated and defeated in detail; many British tanks were lost and the Panzerarmee regained the initiative. The Eighth Army withdrew from the Gazala Line and the Axis troops overran Tobruk in a day. Rommel pursued the Eighth Army into Egypt and forced it out of several defensive positions. The Battle of Gazala is considered the greatest victory of Rommel's career.

As both sides neared exhaustion, the Eighth Army checked the Axis advance at the First Battle of El Alamein. To support the Axis advance into Egypt, the planned attack on Malta (Operation Herkules) was postponed. The British were able to revive Malta as a base for attacks on Axis convoys to Libya, greatly complicating Axis supply difficulties at El Alamein.

== Background ==
=== Benghazi ===
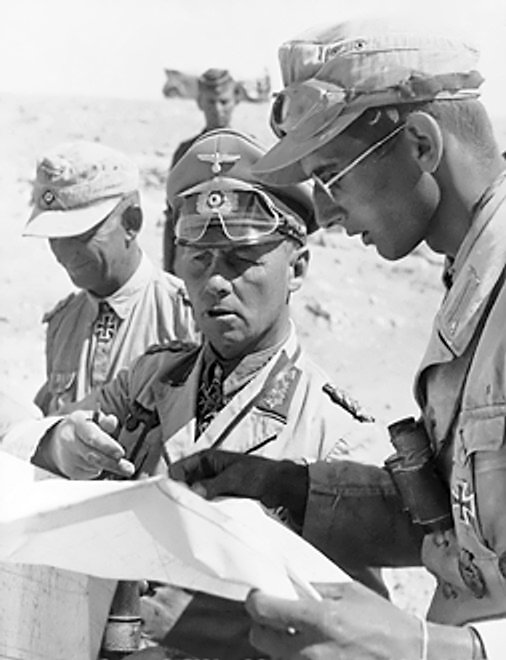
Field Marshal Erwin Rommel, with aides during the desert campaign. 1942

Following Operation Crusader, in late 1941, the British Eighth Army had relieved Tobruk and driven the Axis forces from Cyrenaica to El Agheila. The Eighth Army advance of 500 mi (800 km) over-stretched its supply lines and in January 1942, the Allies reduced the front line garrison for work on lines of communication and supply dumps, preparatory to another westwards advance against Tripolitania. The elimination of Force K from Malta, which ran into an Italian minefield off Tripoli in mid-December and the arrival of Fliegerkorps II in Sicily, neutralised Allied air and naval forces in Malta, allowing more Axis supplies to reach Libya. After a two-month delay, German and Italian forces in Libya began to receive supplies and reinforcements in men and tanks, which continued until the end of May, when Fliegerkorps II was transferred to the Russian front.

While aware from signals intelligence of these reinforcements, GHQ in Cairo underestimated their significance and Axis fighting strength, having greatly exaggerated the casualties inflicted on the Axis during Operation Crusader. In an appreciation made in January 1942, Auchinleck alluded to an Axis fighting strength of 35,000 men, when the true figure was about 80,000 (50,000 German and 30,000 Italian troops). The Eighth Army expected to be ready by February and GHQ Cairo believed that the Axis would be too weak and disorganised to mount a counter-offensive in the meantime. On 21 January, Rommel sent out three strong armoured columns to make a tactical reconnaissance. Finding only the thinnest of screens, Rommel changed his reconnaissance into an offensive, recaptured Benghazi on 28 January and Timimi on 3 February. By 6 February, the Allies had fallen back to a line from Gazala to Bir Hakeim, a few miles west of Tobruk, from which the Italo-Germans had retired seven weeks before. The Allies had 1,309 casualties from 21 January, lost 42 tanks knocked out, another 30 through damage and breakdowns and forty field guns.

=== Gazala line ===
Between Gazala and Timimi, just west of Tobruk, the Eighth Army was able to concentrate its forces sufficiently to turn and fight. By 4 February, the Axis advance had been halted and the front line stabilised from Gazala on the coast 30 mi (48 km) west of Tobruk, to an old Ottoman fortress at Bir Hakeim 50 mi (80 km) inland to the south. The Gazala line was a series of defensive boxes accommodating a brigade each, laid out across the desert behind minefields and wire, watched by regular patrols between the boxes. The Free French were to the south at the Bir Hakeim box, 13 mi (21 km) south of the 150th Infantry Brigade box, which was 6 mi (9.7 km) south of the 69th Infantry Brigade box. The line was not evenly manned, with a greater number of troops covering the coast road, leaving the south less protected but the line was behind deep minefields and a longer line would make an attack around the southern flank harder to supply. Behind the Gazala line, were several defensive boxes. Commonwealth Keep (also known as Hill 209) was at Ras El Madauur on the main defence line of Tobruk, about 9.0 mi (14.5 km) west-south-west of the port. The Acroma, Knightsbridge (12 mi (19 km) south of Acroma) and El Adem boxes were sited to block tracks and junctions. A box at Retma was finished just before the Axis offensive but work on boxes at Point 171 4.0 mi (6.4 km) south-east of Bir Hakeim and Bir el Gubi did not begin until 25 May.

== Prelude ==
=== British preparations ===
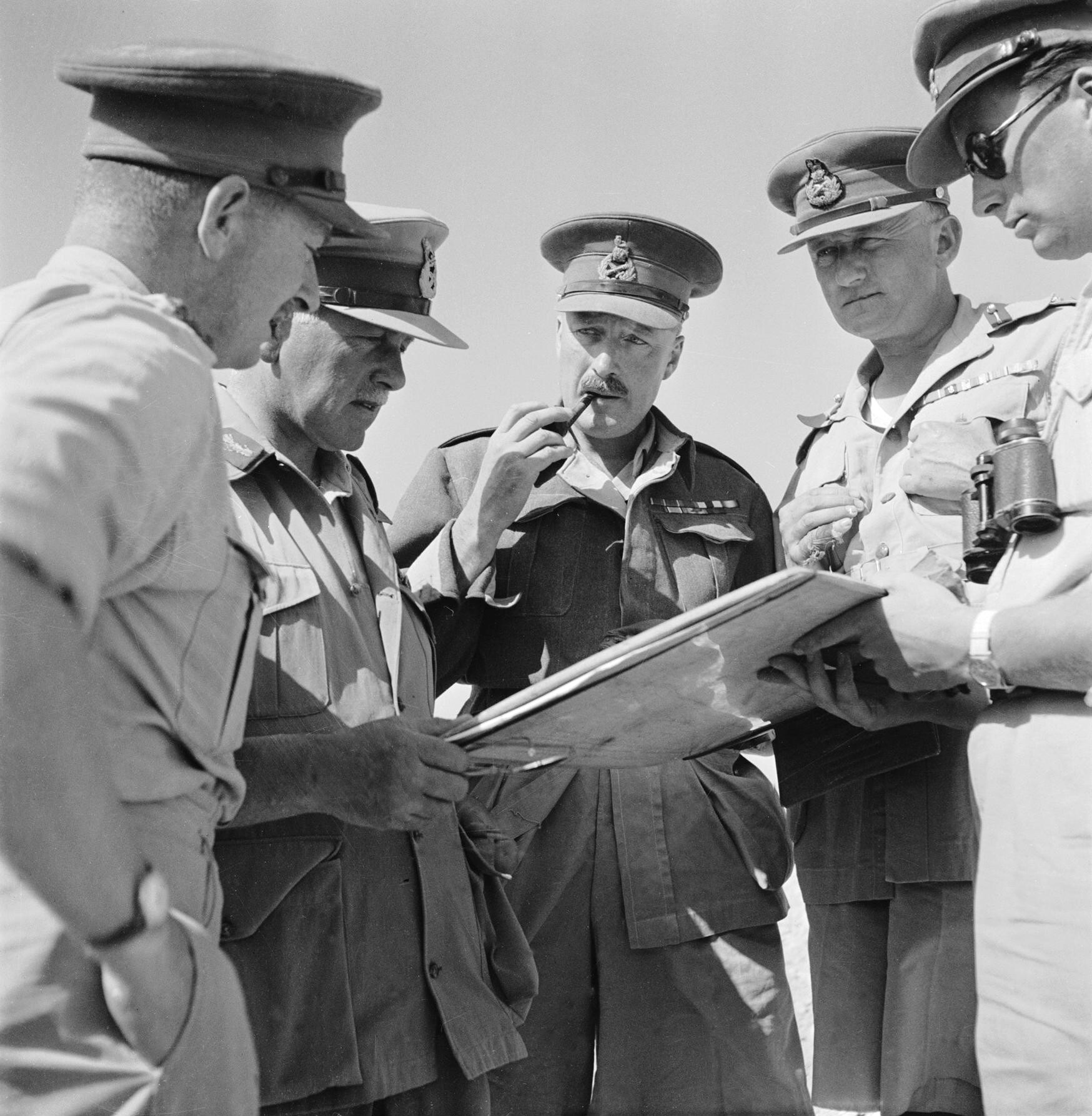
General Ritchie (holding pipe) addressing his commanders, 31 May 1942. Norrie holding map, Gott to right of Ritchie.

Churchill pressed Auchinleck to attack to push the Axis out of Cyrenaica and relieve the pressure on Malta, which Churchill felt was essential to the war effort,

... having particular regard to Malta, the loss of which would be a disaster of the first magnitude to the British Empire and probably fatal in the long run to the defence of the Nile delta.

— Winston Churchill

The Eighth Army received new equipment, including 167 American Lend-Lease M3 Grant tanks equipped with 75 mm guns, and large numbers of 6-pounder anti-tank guns. Rommel thought that Allied minefields ended well north of Bir Hakeim and did not know of the "mine marsh" surrounding the box. The Eighth Army was in the process of reorganising, changing the relationship between infantry and artillery, while the RAF commander Arthur Tedder concentrated the efforts of the Desert Air Force (DAF) on supporting the troops on the ground. Army commanders lost the power to direct air operations, which was reserved for the air commanders. A new fighter-bomber concept was developed and Air Vice-Marshal Arthur Coningham, commander of the DAF, moved his headquarters to the Eighth Army HQ to improve communication.

Axis commanders knew that the entry of the United States into the war would give the Eighth Army access to an increase in materiel but sought to forestall an Allied offensive before these supplies could influence events. By late May, the 1st South African Division was on the Gazala line nearest the coast, the 50th (Northumbrian) Infantry Division to the south and the 1st Free French Brigade furthest south at Bir Hakeim. The 1st and 7th Armoured Divisions waited behind the main line as a mobile counter-attack force, the 2nd South African Division formed a garrison at Tobruk and the 5th Indian Infantry Division (which had arrived in April to relieve the 4th Indian Infantry Division) was held in reserve. The Allies had 110,000 men, 843 tanks and 604 aircraft.

=== Axis preparations ===
Area of Axis advance, El Agheila–El Alamein, 21 January – 21 June 1942

The Axis retreat to El Agheila after Operation Crusader reduced the supply distance from Tripoli to 460 mi (740 km). The discovery of 13,000 long tons (13,000 t) of fuel at Tripoli eased the supply crisis, despite the delivery of only 50,000 long tons (51,000 t) of supplies in January. The Panzerarmee had a much shorter supply line and the British were burdened by an over-extended supply line. Luftflotte II in Sicily had also regained air superiority for the Axis. Rommel asked for another 8,000 lorries but this unrealistic demand was rejected and Rommel was warned that an advance would cause another supply crisis. On 29 January, the Panzerarmee recaptured Benghazi and next day ammunition supply to the front line failed. By 13 February, Rommel agreed to stop at Gazala, 900 mi (1,400 km) from Tripoli.

Until May, monthly deliveries averaged 60,000 long tons (61,000 t), less than the smaller Axis force received from June–October 1941 but sufficient for an offensive. The 900 mi (1,400 km) advance to Gazala succeeded because Benghazi was open, reducing the transport distance for about 33 percent of the supplies of the Panzerarmee to 280 mi (450 km). The Italians tried to restrain Rommel by advocating the capture of Malta, which would postpone another offensive in Africa until the autumn but agreed to an attack on Tobruk for late May. An advance would stop at the Egyptian frontier, another 150 mi (240 km) east and the Luftwaffe would redeploy for Operation Herkules. The capture of Malta would not alter the constraints of port capacity and distance; protecting convoys and a large port close to the front, would still be necessary for victory.

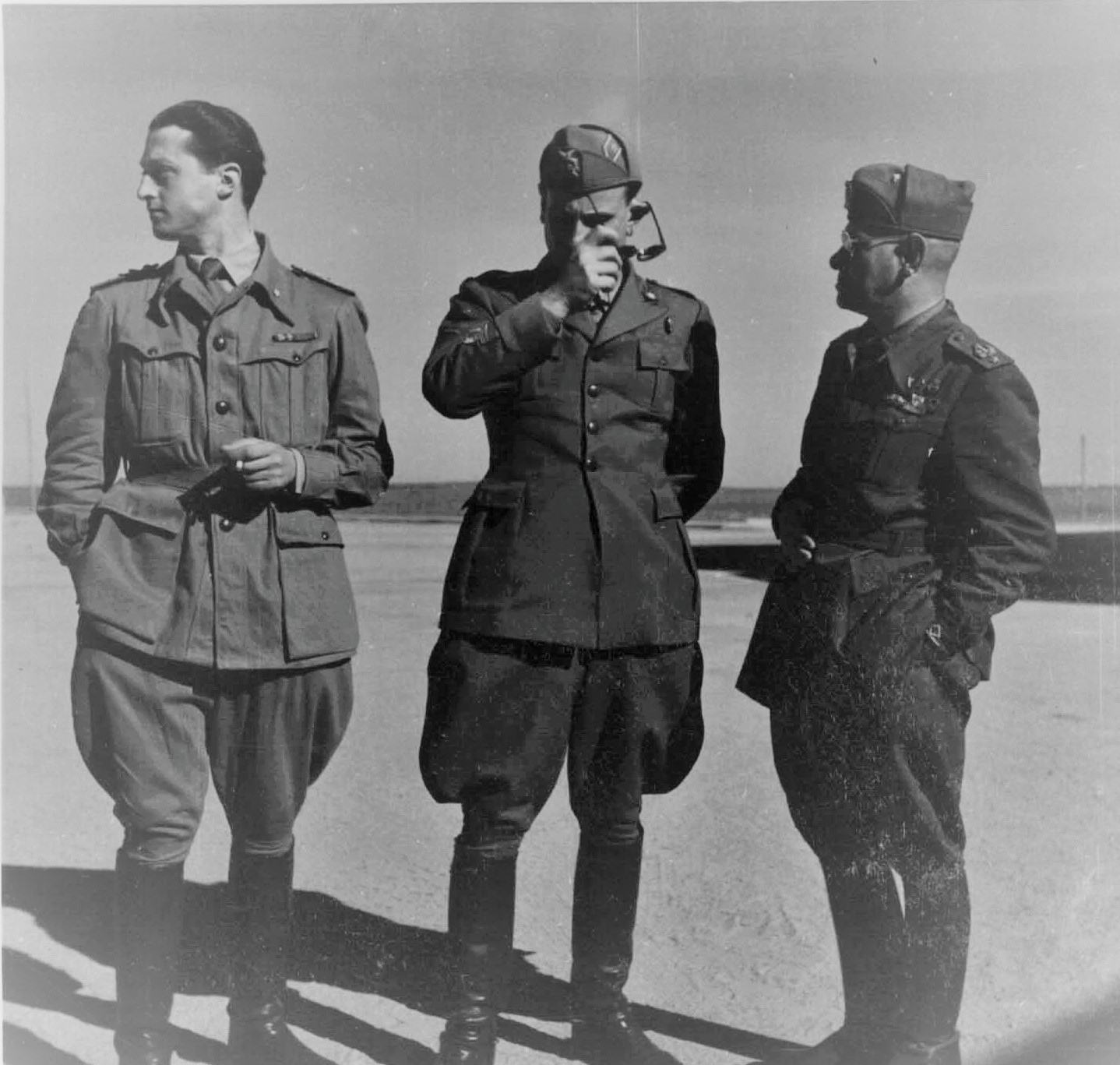
From left to right, the Italian generals Nicolini, Baldassarre and Lombardi.

Air attacks directed by Kesselring against Malta greatly reduced its offensive capacity, allowing supply convoys from Italy to reach Axis forces in Africa with increased regularity. Unternehmen Venezia (Operation Venice), the Axis plan of attack, was for armoured forces to make a flanking manoeuvre south of the fortified "box" at Bir Hakeim. On the left flank, the 132nd Armoured Division "Ariete" would neutralise the Bir Hakeim box and on the right flank, the 21st Panzer Division and 15th Panzer Division would advance north behind the Eighth Army defences, to destroy the Allied armour and cut off the infantry divisions on the Gazala line. On the far right of the attack, a kampfgruppe (battle group) from the 90th Light Afrika Division was to advance to El Adem, south of Tobruk and cut the line of supply from the port to the Gazala line while holding Allied troops at Tobruk.

The rest of the XX Motorized Corps and the 101st Motorised Division "Trieste", would open a gap in the minefield north of the Bir Hakeim box near the Sidi Muftah box, to create a supply route to the armour. Rommel anticipated that, having dealt with the Allied armour, he would capture El Adem, Ed Duda, Sidi Rezegh and "Knightsbridge". The Axis tanks would then be in a position to attack on the following day westwards against the Eighth Army defensive boxes between Gazala and Alem Hamza, meeting the eastwards attack by X Corps and XXI Corps. By late May, the Axis forces comprised 90,000 men, 560 tanks and 542 aircraft. On 26 May, Comando Supremo ordered Bastico and Rommel to launch the offensive, defeat the British armoured forces and capture Tobruk.

== Battle ==
=== Operation Venice ===
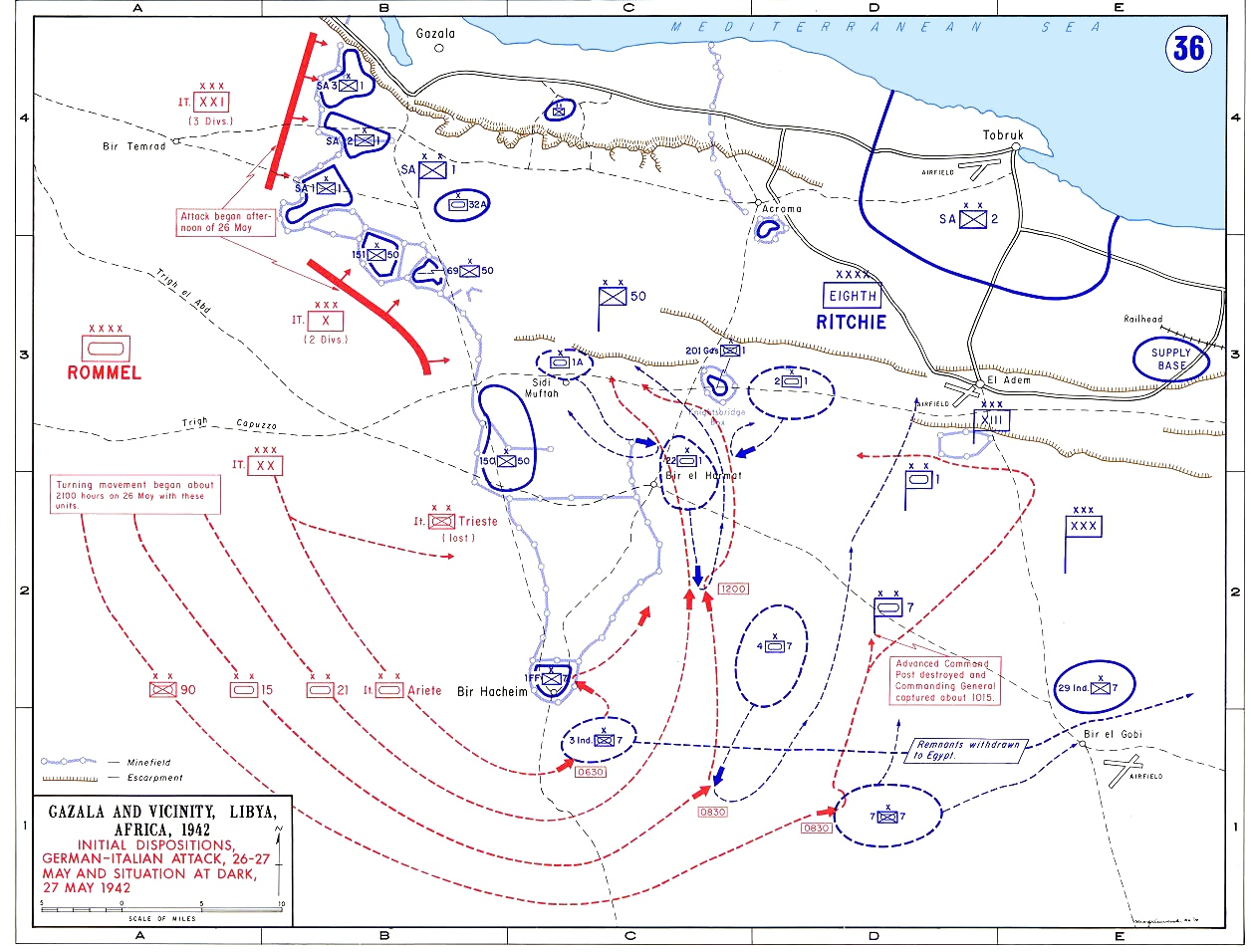
Axis advance, opening of Operation Venice

At 14:00 on 26 May, X Corps and XXI Corps attacked on the central Gazala positions, after an artillery concentration, beginning Unternehmen Venezia (Operation Venice). (Note: Rommel's plan (issued as "Order for Army Operations", 20 May) to encircle the Allied Army deployed between Gazala and Bir Hakeim and capture the fortress of Tobruk, was initially called Operation Theseus (Unternehmen Theseus).Venezia was the code name (funk befehl Venezia) of the last-minute adjustment (evening of 26 May) for the entire motorised Axis force to advance south of Bir Hakeim.) A few elements of the Afrika Korps and XX Mobile Corps were attached to these assault groups. During the day, the bulk of the Deutsches Afrikakorps (DAK) moved, to give the impression that this was the main Axis assault. When night fell, the armoured formations turned south in a sweeping move around the southern end of the Gazala line.

In the early hours of 27 May, Rommel led the elements of Panzerarmee Afrika, DAK, XX Motorised Corps and the German 90th Light Afrika Division, in a bold flanking move around the southern end of the Allied line, using the Allied minefields to protect the Axis flank and rear. The "Ariete" Division was held up for about an hour by the 3rd Indian Motor Brigade of the 7th Armoured Division, dug in about 3.7 mi (6 km) south east of Bir Hakeim at Rugbet el Atasc. The 132nd Tank Infantry Regiment of the "Ariete" Division sent its experienced VIII and IX Medium Tank battalions forward, while the fresh X Medium Tank Battalion was in support. The Indian position was overrun with the loss of 23 tanks, some of which were repairable on the field, 30 men killed and 50 wounded, while the Indians lost 440 men killed and wounded and about 1,000 prisoners, including Admiral Sir Walter Cowan and most of its equipment. The 21st Panzer Division was advancing south of the position and did not take part in the action.

Further to the east, the 15th Panzer Division had engaged the 4th Armoured Brigade of the 7th Armoured Division, which had been ordered south to support the 3rd Indian and 7th Motorised brigades. In a mutually costly engagement, the Germans were surprised by the range and power of the 75 mm guns on the new M3 (Grant) tanks. The 4th Armoured Brigade then withdrew toward El Adem and spent the night near the Belhamed supply base, east of El Adem. By late morning, the Axis armoured units had advanced more than 25 mi (40 km) north but by noon had been stopped by the 1st Armoured Division in more mutually-costly fighting.

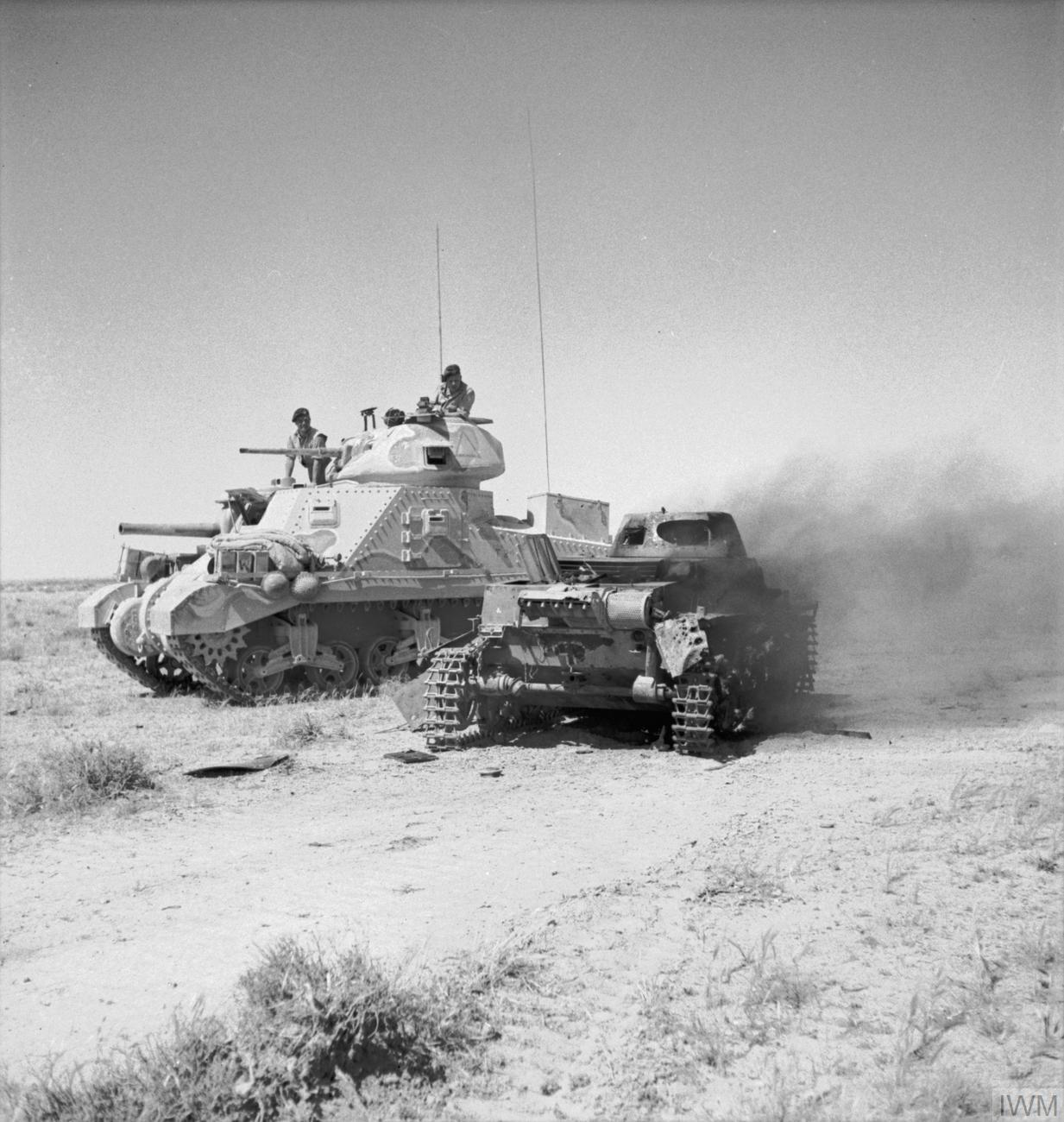
M3 Grant with knocked out Panzer I, 1942

On the far right of the Axis advance, the 90th Light Afrika Division engaged the 7th Motorised Brigade at Retma and forced it to withdraw eastwards on Bir el Gubi. Resuming their advance toward El Adem before noon, armoured cars of the 90th Light came upon the advanced HQ of 7th Armoured Division near Bir Beuid, dispersing it and capturing a number of officers, including the commander, Frank Messervy, who pretended to be a batman and escaped. The "inexcusable" lapse in security left the division without effective command for the next two days. As planned, the 90th Light Division reached the El Adem area by mid-morning and captured a number of supply dumps. The following day, the 4th Armoured Brigade was sent to El Adem and the 90th Light Division was driven back to the south-west.

The tank battle continued for three days; lacking possession of Bir Hakeim, Rommel drew the DAK into a defensive position, using the extensive Allied mine belts to block an Allied approach from the west. The British tanks attacked several times from the north and east against accurate defensive fire. The Axis supply situation became desperate; defending the German rear, the "Ariete" Division repulsed attacks by the British armoured brigades on 29 May and during the first week of June.

=== Bir Hakeim ===
The Bir Hakeim box was defended by the 1st Free French Brigade under Marie-Pierre Kœnig. On 27 May, the Italian IX Tank Battalion of the 132nd Tank Infantry Regiment (Ariete Division), which had not been engaged in the destruction of the 3rd Indian Brigade box and had continued to advance alone at full speed, stumbled in the French positions and launched a hasty attack, which was a costly failure against the French 75 mm guns and mines. On the night of 1/2 June, the 90th Light and Trieste divisions were sent south to renew the attack on Bir Hakeim, where the battle continued for another ten days.

Our attacks repeatedly bogged down in the excellent French fortifications. During the first ten days of out [sic] attack against the French the British had remained amazingly calm. The Ariete Division alone was attacked by them on 2 June but it defended itself stubbornly. After a counter-attack by the 21st Panzer Division the situation there again became quiet.

— Generalmajor Alfred Toppe

Reinforced with a further kampfgruppe, the Axis attacked Bir Hakeim again on 9 June and overran the defences by the following day. Ritchie ordered the remaining troops to evacuate as best they could, under the cover of darkness. Under fire through the night, many of the French were able to find gaps in the line through which to withdraw. The survivors then made their way some 5.0 mi (8 km) to the west, to rendezvous with transport from the 7th Motor Brigade. About 2,700 troops (including 200 wounded) of the original garrison of 3,600 escaped and about 500 French troops, many of whom were wounded, were captured when the 90th Light Division occupied the position on 11 June.

=== The Cauldron ===
Early on 29 May, supply vehicles supported by the Trieste and Ariete divisions, worked through the minefield north of Bir Hakeim and reached the Afrika Korps. On 30 May, Rommel pulled the Afrika Korps back westward against the edge of the minefields, creating a defensive position. A link was formed with elements of the Italian X Corps, which were clearing two routes through the minefields from the west. In the process, the Sidi Muftah box was overrun and the defending 150th Infantry Brigade was destroyed after brutal fighting. At one point, Rommel personally led a platoon of panzer grenadiers in the attack;

In the afternoon [30th May] I personally reconnoitred the possibilities for an attack on Got el Ualeb [the Sidi Muftah box] and detailed units of the Afrika Korps, 90th Light Division and the Italian Trieste Division for an assault on the British positions next morning. The attack was launched on the morning of the 31st May. German-Italian units fought their way forward yard by yard against the toughest British resistance imaginable. ... Nevertheless, by the time evening came we had penetrated a substantial distance into the British positions. On the following day the defenders were to receive their quietus. After heavy Stuka attacks, the infantry again surged forward against the British field positions. ... Piece by piece the elaborate British defences were won until by early afternoon the whole position was ours. The last British resistance was quenched. We took in all 3,000 prisoners and destroyed or captured 101 tanks and armoured cars, as well as 124 guns of all kinds.

— Rommel

Acting on mistaken reports about German tank losses, Auchinleck strongly urged Ritchie to counter-attack along the coast, to exploit the absence of German tanks and break through to Timimi and then Mechili. Ritchie was more concerned by Tobruk, brought reinforcements up to the El Adem box and created new defensive boxes opposite the gaps in the minefield. Ritchie ordered the Eighth Army to counter-attack against the Afrika Korps on 5 June but they were met by accurate fire from tank and anti-tank guns positioned in the cauldron. In the north, XIII Corps made no progress but the attack by 7th Armoured and 5th Indian divisions on the eastern flank of the cauldron at 02:50 initially went well. An important element of the plan was the destruction of the Axis anti-tank screen with an artillery bombardment but because of an error in plotting its position, the bombardment fell too far to the east. When the 22nd Armoured Brigade advanced, it was met by massed anti-tank fire and checked. The 32nd Army Tank Brigade, advancing from the north, joined the attack at dawn but also ran into massed fire, losing fifty of seventy tanks.

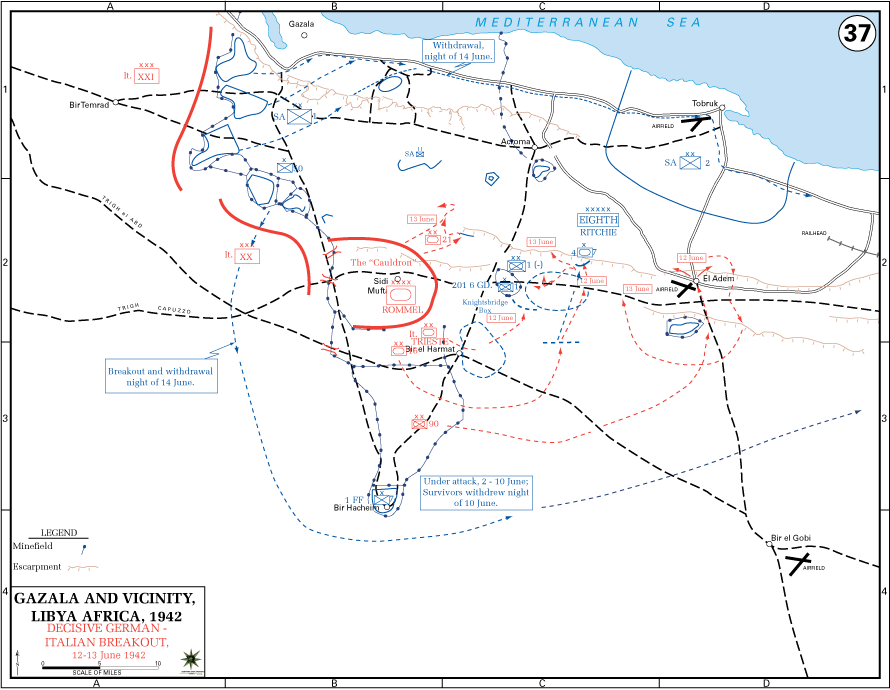
Axis attack from the Cauldron, 12–13 June

By early afternoon on 5 June, Rommel split his forces, deciding to attack east with the Ariete and 21st Panzer divisions while he sent elements of 15th Panzer Division northwards against the Knightsbridge Box. The eastward thrust towards Bir el Hatmat dispersed the tactical HQs of the two British divisions, as well as the HQs of the 9th Indian Infantry Brigade, the 10th Indian Infantry Brigade and other smaller units, which caused command to break down. The 22nd Armoured Brigade, having lost 60 of its 156 tanks, was forced from the battlefield by more attacks from the 15th Panzer Division. Three Indian infantry battalions, a reconnaissance regiment and four artillery regiments of the attacking force were left behind, unsupported by armour and overrun. Rommel retained the initiative, maintaining his strength in the cauldron while the number of operational British tanks diminished. A number of probes were sent to test the various opposing strong points and from 6 to 8 June, further attacks were launched on Bir Hakeim and repulsed by the French garrison. The 7th Motor Brigade and 29th Indian Infantry Brigade continued to harass the Axis lines of communications.

=== Knightsbridge, 10 June ===
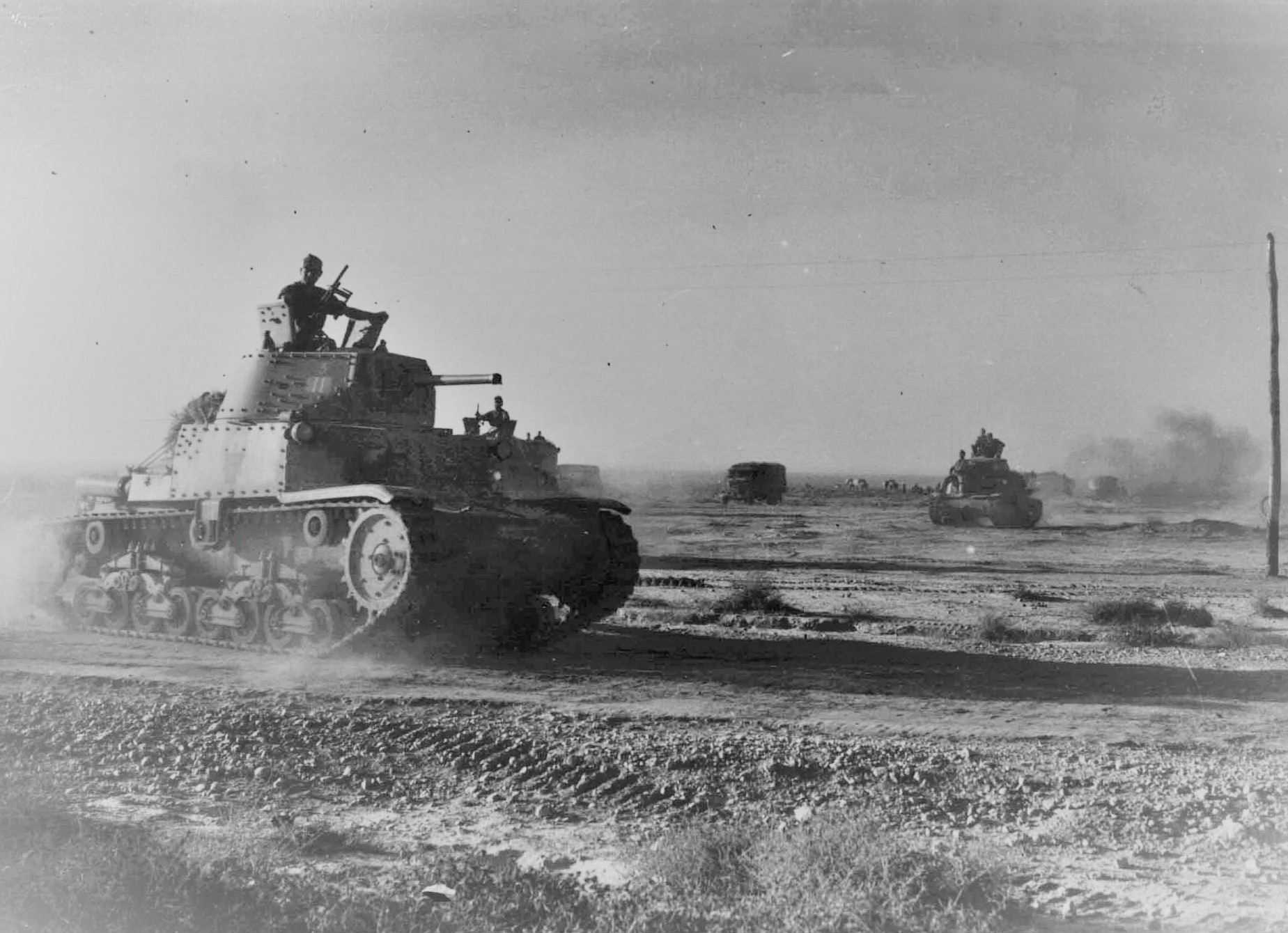
M13/40 tanks of the Ariete Armoured Division on the move during the battle.

Orders for the 4th Armoured Brigade were to occupy Hill 176, west of Trigh Bir Hakeim, then attack the Ariete and force it to withdraw. The 2nd Armoured Brigade was to carry out a demonstration in support of the 4th Armoured Brigade. At 05:45 on 10 June, C Squadron, equipped with M3 Grant tanks, of the Queen's Bays left the bivouac between Rigel Ridge to the north and Trigh Capuzzo to the south, heading towards the Ariete positions. At 07:00 C Squadron of the Queen's Bays came into contact with the tank units of the Ariete, which sustained the shock and at about 08:00 forced the British to withdraw. On the start line the 6th RTR was on the right, with C Squadron on the left, B Squadron on the right and A Squadron ready to intervene on both flanks. The 1st RTR was deployed on the left with A Squadron in the lead (intended to cover the left flank of the regiment), followed by C Squadron, the command, B Squadron and a battery of the 1st RHA. At 08:40 the 6th RTR, preceded by a two-hour artillery preparation and covered by smoke bombs, invested the 2nd Company/VIII Battalion of the 132nd Infantry Tank Regiment.

The formation saw the Grants in the centre and the Stuarts on the wings but their M13s and the self-propelled guns managed to prevent the envelopment and forced the British to march along the front, exposing the flanks of their tanks to Italian fire. At 09:00, finding itself under fire from anti-tank guns as well as tanks, C Squadron, 6th RTR closed in on the Italian tanks, managing to hit an Italian vehicle. The pressure on the Italian tanks managed to push them to within about 220 yd (200 m) of the anti-tank defence line, which then found it difficult to lay its anti-tank guns as they were masked by the Italian tanks. The 88/55 gun, after having adjusted its fire, at 09:40 destroyed two British tanks and stopped a third, then C Squadron began its retreat, followed after ten minutes by the rest of the 6th RTR while the anti-tank gun was countered by counter-battery fire from the RHA. At 11:00 a patrol of the 6th RTR, sent ahead to check the situation on the battlefield, was repulsed by artillery fire and at 11:30, another attack was made and was repulsed by concentrated fire from the Italian defences. At 14:00 the Queen's Bays were ordered to intervene to support the struggling 4th Armoured Brigade and having reached the position where the retreating regiments had stopped, exchanged positions with those of the 1st RTR, without there being any further clashes with the Italians.

=== Black Saturday, 13 June ===
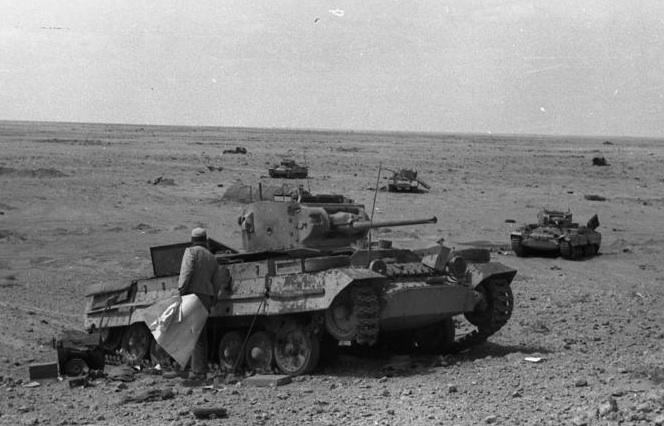
Abandoned British Valentines are inspected for maps, code books and tins of food

On 11 June, Rommel pushed the 15th Panzer Division and 90th Light Afrika Division toward El Adem and by 12 June had begun forcing the 201st Guards Brigade out of the Knightsbridge Box. The 29th Indian Infantry Brigade repulsed an attack on the El Adem box on 12 June but the 2nd and 4th Armoured brigades on their left were pushed back 3.7 mi (6 km) by the 15th Panzer Division and left their damaged tanks on the battlefield. On 13 June, the 21st Panzer Division advanced against the 22nd Armoured Brigade. The Afrika Korps had combined tanks with anti-tank guns; Rommel had acted rapidly on intelligence obtained from Allied radio intercepts.

By the end of the day, the British tank strength had been reduced from 300 tanks to about seventy; the Afrika Korps had established armour superiority and a dominating line of positions, making XIII Corps on the Gazala line vulnerable to being cut off. By the end of 13 June, the Knightsbridge box was virtually surrounded and was abandoned by the Guards Brigade later that night, their commanding officer Thomas Bevan having been killed the previous day. Due to these failures, 13 June became known as "Black Saturday" to the Eighth Army.

==== Rigel Ridge ====
The aftermath of an Axis attack on a British defensive position

On 13 June, the 21st Panzer Division attacked Rigel Ridge in the middle of a sandstorm. The Germans overran part of the 2nd Scots Guards at the Knightsbridge Box at the west end of Rigel Ridge, overlooked by the 6th South African Anti-tank battery of the 2nd Field Regiment, Natal Field Artillery and a battery of the 11th (HAC) Regiment RHA nearby. The South African gunners kept firing until their guns were destroyed, allowing the withdrawal of other Allied formations. The South African battery commander had decided to stay and maintain fire against the German tanks, to delay the Germans for as long as possible.

The remaining guns were commanded individually and fired at the Panzers over open sights. The German tanks took up positions behind the ridge, with anti-tank guns placed between them. A column of Panzers attacked from the rear, surrounding them and cutting off all escape and the gunners kept firing until the eight guns had been destroyed. About half the gun detachments were killed and wounded, including the battery commander and many officers. The last gun in action was manned by Lieutenant Ashley and a signaller; when the battery had been silenced, the Axis tanks approached cautiously and the South African gunners were taken prisoner.

=== Eighth Army retreat ===
A British soldier killed at the Battle of Bir Hakeim in the spring of 1942

On 14 June, Auchinleck authorised Ritchie to withdraw from the Gazala Line. The defenders in the El Adem and two neighbouring boxes held on and the 1st South African Division was able to withdraw along the coast road, practically intact. The road could not accommodate two divisions and the remaining two brigades of the 50th (Northumbrian) Division could not retreat eastwards because of the Axis tanks and attacked south-west, breaking through the lines of the 27th Infantry Division "Brescia" and 17th Infantry Division "Pavia" of X Corps; then headed south into the desert, before turning east. London would not contemplate a withdrawal to the better defensive positions on the Egypt–Libya frontier.

On 14 June, Auchinleck ordered to Ritchie to hold a line running south-east from Acroma (west of Tobruk) through El Adem to Bir El Gubi. By the evening of 15 June, the defensive box at Point 650 had been overrun and on 16 June, the defenders at Point 187 had been forced by lack of supplies to evacuate. The defensive boxes at El Adem and Sidi Rezegh were also attacked by the Afrika Korps. On 17 June, both boxes were evacuated, ending any chance of preventing the encirclement of Tobruk. Ritchie ordered the Eighth Army to withdraw to Mersa Matruh, about 100 mi (160 km) east of the frontier, leaving Tobruk to threaten the Axis lines of communication as in 1941. The retreat became known to some as the Gazala Gallop.

=== Fall of Tobruk ===
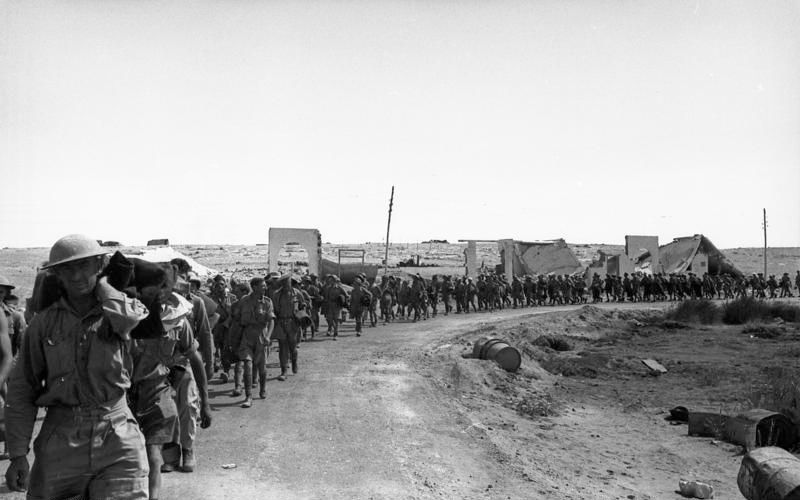
Allied prisoners are marched out of Tobruk

In February 1942, the army, navy and air force commanders-in-chief in Cairo had agreed that Tobruk should not stand another siege. Auchinleck viewed the defence of Tobruk as a lesser matter and told Ritchie that he did not intend to hold it at all costs. An immense store of supplies of every description had been accumulated around the port for an Allied offensive and Auchinleck expected it to be able to hold out for two months with the supplies in the fortress. The defences at Tobruk had not been maintained and it was garrisoned by inexperienced troops. Gott garrisoned Tobruk with the two brigades of 2nd South African Division (Major-General Hendrik Klopper) along with the 201st Guards (Motorised) Brigade, 11th Indian Infantry Brigade, 32nd Army Tank Brigade and the 4th Anti-Aircraft Brigade.

Operation Venice (Unternehmen Venezia) began on 26 May 1942 and drove the Eighth Army east of Tobruk, leaving it vulnerable to attack from the east. The British prime minister Winston Churchill had placed great store on the symbolic value of Tobruk and there was an exchange of ambiguous signals, leading to the port becoming surrounded and besieged, rather than evacuated as originally planned. Panzerarmee Afrika penetrated a weak spot on the eastern defensive perimeter and took the port within twenty-four hours. The garrison of 33,000 men was captured, many of those on the western perimeter not having been engaged. Over 1,000 vehicles in working order, 5,000 long tons (5,100 t) of food and 1,400 long tons (1,400 t) of petrol were captured. The surrender was the largest capitulation of British Empire forces in the war after the Battle of Singapore in February 1942. Later in the year, a Court of Inquiry (in absentia) found Klopper to be largely blameless for the surrender and ascribed the defeat to failures among the British high command. The findings were kept secret until after the war, doing little to restore the reputation of Klopper and his troops.

== Aftermath ==
=== Analysis ===
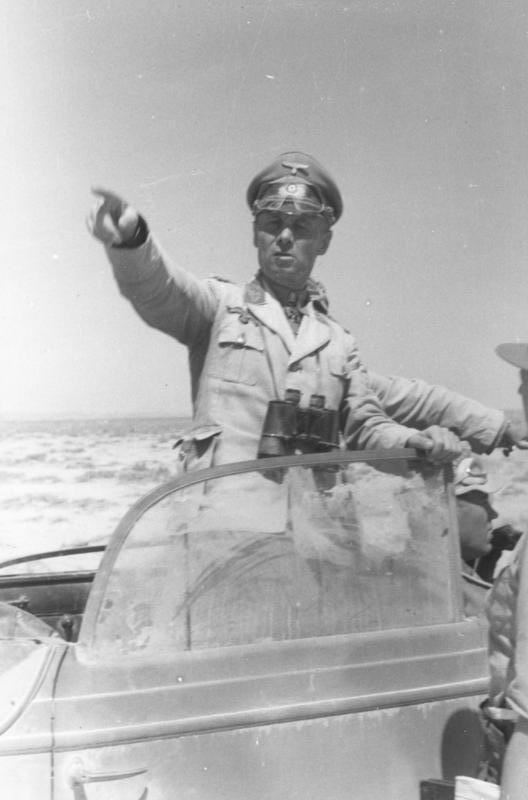
Generaloberst Erwin Rommel, west of Tobruk

With the capture of Tobruk, the Axis gained a port nearer the Aegean–Crete route and a large amount of Allied supplies. If the Allies could not stop the Germans in Egypt, they would take the Suez Canal and potentially drive for the oilfields in the Middle East. Hitler rewarded Rommel with a promotion to the rank of field-marshal, the youngest German officer ever to achieve this rank. Rommel remarked he would have preferred another panzer division.

Churchill wrote,

This was one of the heaviest blows I can recall during the war. Not only were its military effects grievous, but it had affected the reputation of the British armies.

— Winston Churchill

Auchinleck dismissed Ritchie on 25 June and assumed command of the Eighth Army for the First Battle of El Alamein, where he stopped Rommel's advance. In August, Auchinleck was replaced as Eighth Army commander by the XIII Corps commander, Lieutenant-General William Gott and as C-in-C Middle East Command by General Sir Harold Alexander. Gott was killed when his aircraft was shot down and Lieutenant-General Bernard Montgomery was appointed as his replacement.

In 2017, James Holland wrote,

As Rommel said to a captured British officer, 'What difference does it make if you have two tanks to my one, when you spread them out and let me smash them in detail?' That one sentence really did encapsulate the nub of the matter and the failure of the Auk's approach. Frankly, he and his senior commanders should have known better by now.

=== Casualties ===
The Eighth Army suffered 50,000 casualties, including c. 35,000 prisoners taken at Tobruk. The Germans suffered 3,360 casualties, about 15 per cent of their force. Italian casualties were 3,000 men, 125 tanks, 44 armoured cars, 450 motor vehicles, 39 guns and seventy-four 47 mm anti-tank guns. On 30 June, the Afrika Korps reported that Axis tank losses were c. 400 and that only 44–55 German tanks were operational, the Italian XX Corps was down to fifteen tanks and the 90th Light Afrika Division had only 1,679 men left. The Eighth Army lost thousands of tons of supplies, nearly 800,000 rounds of artillery ammunition, nearly 13 million rounds of small-arms ammunition and a huge number of tanks. Hundreds of damaged tanks had been left behind when armoured regiments retreated and it was estimated that there were 1,188 tank casualties in 17 days. On 22 June, the Desert Air Force had 463 operational aircraft, 420 of them in the Middle East, the Germans 183 and the Italians 238, with another 174 in reserve and 500 in the Mediterranean excluding Italy. The Royal Army Ordnance Corps recovered 581 tanks up to 19 June, repaired 278 and sent 222 back to Egypt (326 being US-made tanks). The Eighth Army was reduced to about 185 operational tanks by the end of the battle and shuffling operational tanks and crews between units disrupted unit organisation. Seven field artillery regiments, 6,000 lorries and two tank repair workshops (which had been moved into Tobruk) were lost. By 1 July, the Eighth Army was back at El Alamein, with 137 serviceable tanks, 42 en route from workshops and 902 tanks waiting to be repaired.

=== Subsequent operations ===
Panzerarmee Afrika began Unternehmen Aïda, an advance upon Egypt, while the Eighth Army fell back to El Alamein. Auchinleck decided not to hold Mersa Matruh, choosing to fight a delaying action with X and XIII Corps. The Afrika Korps was delayed at the Battle of Mersa Matruh but signals failures led to disorganisation and the X Corps line of retreat along the coast road being cut off. The corps broke out at night to the south and worked its way around the German positions, collided with Axis forces several times and lost more than 6,000 prisoners, forty tanks and a large quantity of supplies. Auchinleck had ordered the bulk of the Eighth Army to retire another 99 mi (160 km) to El Alamein, 62 mi (100 km) from Alexandria. The retirements brought the Eighth Army closer to its base and the Qattara Depression to the south of El Alamein closed the southern flank. The Allied and Axis forces fought the First Battle of El Alamein, the Battle of Alam el Halfa and the Second Battle of El Alamein. Operation Agreement, a British landing at Tobruk during the night of 13/14 September, to rescue Allied prisoners, was a failure.

== Orders of battle ==
Allied and Axis forces, Gazala, 26 May – 21 June 1942

=== Allies ===
- Middle East Command (Claude Auchinleck)

Eighth Army (Neil Ritchie)

XIII Corps (William Gott)

- 1st South African Division (Dan Pienaar)
  - 1st South African Infantry Brigade Group
  - 2nd South African Infantry Brigade Group
  - 3rd South African Infantry Brigade Group
- 2nd South African Division (Hendrik Klopper) (in Tobruk)
  - 4th South African Infantry Brigade Group
  - 6th Infantry South African Brigade Group
  - 9th Indian Infantry Brigade Group (Bernard Fletcher) (from 5th Indian Division and moved to 7th Armoured Division at the Cauldron in early June)
  - 11th Indian Infantry Brigade (Andrew Anderson) (from Army Reserve to replace 9th Indian Infantry Brigade Group)
- 50th (Northumbrian) Infantry Division (William Ramsden)
  - 150th Infantry Brigade Group (Haydon)
  - 151st Infantry Brigade Group (John Nichols)
  - 69th Infantry Brigade Group (Hassall)
- 1st Army Tank Brigade (O'Carroll)
- 32nd Army Tank Brigade (Willison)

XXX Corps (Charles Norrie)

- 1st Armoured Division (Herbert Lumsden)
  - 2nd Armoured Brigade Group (Briggs)
  - 22nd Armoured Brigade Group (Carr)
  - 201st Guards Motor Brigade (John Marriott until 17 June then G. F. Johnson)
- 7th Armoured Division (Frank Messervy)
  - 4th Armoured Brigade Group (Gatehouse)
  - 7th Motor Brigade Group (James Renton)
  - 3rd Indian Motor Brigade Group (Filose)
  - 29th Indian Infantry Brigade Group (Denys Reid) from 5th Indian Infantry Division
  - 1st Free French Brigade Group (Marie Kœnig) (under 7th Armoured Division command when defending Bir Hakeim)

Army Reserve

- 5th Indian Infantry Division (Harold Briggs)
  - 10th Indian Infantry Brigade (Charles Boucher)
  - 2nd Free French Brigade Group
- 10th Indian Infantry Division (Thomas Rees) (arriving from Iraq)
  - 20th Indian Infantry Brigade (MacGregor)
  - 21st Indian Infantry Brigade (Purves)
  - 25th Indian Infantry Brigade (Ronald Mountain)
- 11th Indian Infantry Brigade (Andrew Anderson) (from 4th Indian Infantry Division)
- 1st Armoured Brigade
- 5th Indian Infantry Brigade from mid-June (Dudley Russell) (from 4th Indian Infantry Division)

=== Axis ===
Details from Pitt 2001 unless indicated.

- Comandante Superiore: Generale d'Armata (Ettore Bastico)

Panzerarmee Afrika (Generaloberst Erwin Rommel)

- Deutsches Afrika Korps (Generalleutnant Walter Nehring)
  - 15th Panzer Division (Generalleutnant Gustav von Värst [wounded 27 May then Oberst Eduard Crasemann])
  - 21st Panzer Division (Generalmajor Georg von Bismarck)
  - 90th Light Division (Generalmajor Ulrich Kleemann)
- Corpo d'Armata di Manovra XX (Generale di Corpo d'Armata Ettore Baldassarre)
  - 132nd Armoured Division "Ariete" (Generale di Divisione Giuseppe De Stefanis)
  - 101st Motorised Division "Trieste" (Generale di Divisione Arnaldo Azzi)

Infanteriegruppe Crüwell (Ludwig Crüwell) (Note: Gruppe Crüwell was part of Panzerarmee Afrika but Rommel temporarily split the force in half, Crüwell commanding the infantry formations along the original front line, while Rommel joined the mobile forces in the flanking move. After Crüwell was captured on 29 May 1942, Gruppe Crüwell was placed under the temporary command of Field Marshal Albert Kesselring, who had been visiting the front.)

- Corpo d'Armata X (Generale di Corpo d'Armata Benvenuto Gioda)
  - 27th Infantry Division "Brescia" (Generale di Divisione Giacomo Lombardi)
  - 17th Infantry Division "Pavia" (Generale di Divisione Antonio Franceschini)
- Corpo d'Armata XXI (Generale di Corpo d'Armata Enea Navarini)
  - 102nd Motorised Division "Trento" (Generale di Divisione Francesco Scotti)
  - 60th Infantry Division "Sabratha" (Generale di Divisione Mario Soldarelli)
  - Light Infantry Regiment 155 (detached from 90th Light Division)

== See also ==
- Battle of Bir Hakeim
- List of Italian military equipment in World War II
- List of German military equipment of World War II
- List of British military equipment of World War II
- List of French military equipment of World War II
- List of equipment of the United States Army during World War II
- North African campaign timeline
- List of World War II Battles

== Bibliography ==
=== Books ===
- Barr, Niall (2005). Pendulum of War: The Three Battles of El Alamein. Woodstock NY: Overlook. ISBN 1-58567-738-8.
- Bierman, John; Smith, Colin (2003) [2002]. Alamein; War Without Hate. New York: Penguin Books. ISBN 0-670-91109-7.
- Carver, Michael (1964). Tobruk. London: Pan Books. OCLC 1089494.
- Carver, M. (2002) [1986]. Dilemmas of the Desert War: The Libyan Campaign 1940–1942 (2nd pbk. Spellmount ed.). Staplehurst: Batsford. ISBN 978-1-86227-153-1.
- Clifford, Alexander (1943). Three Against Rommel: The Campaigns of Wavell, Auchinleck and Alexander. London: Harrap. OCLC 186758297.
- Creveld, M. van (1977). Supplying War: Logistics from Wallenstein to Patton. Cambridge: Cambridge University Press. ISBN 0-521-29793-1.
- Ellis, Chris (2001). 21st Panzer Division: Rommel's Afrika Korps Spearhead. Shepperton: Ian Allan. ISBN 0-7110-2853-2.
- Ford, Ken (2005). Gazala 1942: Rommel's Greatest Victory. Oxford: Osprey. ISBN 978-1-84603-264-6.
- Greene, J.; Massignani, A. (1994). Rommel's North Africa Campaign: September 1940 – November 1942. Conshohocken, PA: Combined Books. ISBN 0-58519-391-6.
- Harper, Glyn (2017). The Battle for North Africa: El Alamein and the Turning Point for World War II. Bloomington, IN: Indiana University Press. ISBN 978-0-253-03142-6.
- Hinsley, F. H.; et al. (1981). British Intelligence in the Second World War. Its Influence on Strategy and Operations. History of the Second World War. Vol. II. London: HMSO. ISBN 0-11-630934-2.
- Hoffman, Karl (2004). Erwin Rommel. London: Brassey's. ISBN 1-85753-374-7.
- Holland, James (2017). The War in the West, A New History: The Allies fight back 1941–1943. Vol. II. London: Bantam Press. ISBN 978-0-593-07167-0.
- Lewin, Ronald (1998) [1968]. Rommel As Military Commander. New York: B&N Books. ISBN 978-0-7607-0861-3.
- Mackenzie, Compton (1951). Eastern Epic: September 1939 – March 1943 Defence. Vol. I. London: Chatto & Windus. OCLC 59637091.
- McCrery, Nigel (2011). The Coming Storm: Test and First-Class Cricketers Killed in World War Two. Vol. II. Pen and Sword. ISBN 978-1-5267-0698-0.
- Mead, Richard (2007). Churchill's Lions: A Biographical Guide to the Key British Generals of World War II. Stroud: Spellmount. ISBN 978-1-86227-431-0.
- Mellenthin, Friedrich von (1971) [1956]. Panzer Battles: 1939–1945: A Study of the Use of Armor in the Second World War. New York: Ballantine Books. ISBN 0-345-24440-0.
- Mitcham, S. (2007). Rommel's Lieutenants: The Men who Served the Desert Fox, France, 1940. Westport, CN: Praeger. ISBN 978-0-27599-185-2.
- Montanari, Mario (1989). El Alamein (gennaio – novembre 1942) [El Alamein (January–November 1942)]. Le operazioni in Africa Settentrionale (in Italian). Vol. III (online ed.). Roma: Stato Maggiore dell'esercito, Ufficio Storico. OCLC 313319483. Archived from the original on 26 July 2020 – via issuu.
- Montanari, Mario (1993). El Alamein (gennaio – novembre 1942) [El Alamein (January–November 1942)]. Le operazioni in Africa Settentrionale (in Italian). Vol. III. Roma: Stato Maggiore dell'esercito, Ufficio Storico. OCLC 313319483.
- Montanari (2007). The Three Battles of El Alamein: June–November 1942. Roma: Italia Stato maggiore dell'esercito Ufficio storico. ISBN 978-8-88-794079-4.
- Nash, N.S. (2013). Strafer Desert General: The Life and Killing of Lieutenant General WHE Gott CB CBE DSO MC. Barnsley: Pen and Sword. ISBN 978-1-78159-090-4.
- Parri, Maurizio (2009). Tracce di Cingolo - Storia dei Carristi 1917–2009 [Track Traces - History of the Tankers 1917–2009]. Roma: Associazione Nazionale Carristi d'Italia/Commandante 132° Reggimento Carri. Archived from the original on 6 December 2019 – via docplayer.
- Mosolo, Enzo (August 2013). 10 giugno 1942, Africa Settentrionale [10 June 1942, North Africa]. Storia Militare (in Italian). Vol. 239.
- Pitt, Barrie (2001) [1980]. The Crucible of War: Auchinleck's Command (2nd pbk. Cassell, London ed.). London: Jonathan Cape. ISBN 0-304-35951-3.
- Playfair, I. S. O.; et al. (2004a) [1960]. Butler, Sir James (ed.). The Mediterranean and Middle East: British Fortunes reach their Lowest Ebb (September 1941 to September 1942). History of the Second World War, United Kingdom Military Series. Vol. III (pbk. repr. Naval & Military Press, Uckfield, UK ed.). London: HMSO. ISBN 1-845740-67-X.
- Playfair, I. S. O.; Flynn, F. C.; Molony, C. J. C. & Gleave, T. P. (2004) [1966]. Butler, Sir James (ed.). The Mediterranean and Middle East: The Destruction of the Axis Forces in Africa. History of the Second World War, United Kingdom Military Series. Vol. IV. Uckfield, UK: Naval & Military Press. ISBN 978-184574-068-9.
- Rommel, Erwin (1982) [1953]. Liddell Hart, B. H. (ed.). The Rommel Papers. New York: Da Capo Press. ISBN 978-0-306-80157-0.
- Rondeau, Benoit (2013). Afrikakorps, L'Armée de Rommel [Afrikakorps, The Army of Rommel] (in French). Paris: Tallandier. OCLC 851936614.
- Sadler, John (2015). Ghost Patrol: A History of the Long Range Desert Group, 1940–1945. Oxford: Casemate. ISBN 978-1-61200-336-8.
- Stumpf, Reinhard (2001) [1990]. "Part V The War in the Mediterranean 1942–43: Operations in North Africa and in the Central Mediterranean". The Global War Widening of the Conflict into a World War and the Shift of the Initiative 1941–1943. Das Deutsche Reich und der Zweite Weltkrieg. Vol. VI. Translated by Osers, Ewald; Brownjohn, John; Crampton, Patricia; Willmot, Louise (eng. trans. Cambridge University Press, London ed.). Stuttgart: Deutsche Verlags-Anstalt for the Militärgeschichtlichen Forschungsamt. ISBN 0-19-822888-0.
- Toppe, Alfred (1990) [~1947]. German Experiences in Desert Warfare During World War II. FMFRP 12-96. Vol. II. Washington: Headquarters, U.S. Marine Corps. OCLC 23705039.
- Walker, I. W. (2003). Iron Hulls, Iron Hearts: Mussolini's Elite Armoured Divisions in North Africa. Marlborough: Crowood Press. ISBN 978-1-86126-646-0.
- Yeide, Harry (2006). Weapons of the Tankers: American Armor in World War II. St. Paul, MN: Zenith Press. ISBN 978-0-7603-2329-8.

=== Journals ===
- Horn, Karen; Katz, David (2016). "The Surrender of Tobruk in 1942: Press Reports and Soldiers' Memories". Scientia Militaria. 44 (1): 190–208. doi:10.5787/44-1-1167. Archived from the original on 10 November 2019.

=== Magazines ===
- "Massachusetts: For Services Rendered". Time. New York. 20 July 1942. OCLC 910607431. Archived from the original on 24 October 2017.

=== Websites ===
- "The History of the British 7th Armoured Division: The Desert Rats: Engagements 1942". May–June 1942. Archived from the original on 10 August 2015.
