= Henry Finnis =

General Sir Henry Finnis KCB CSI MC
- Born: 21 April 1890; Bengal Presidency. India
- Died: 31 May 1945 (aged 55); Rawalpindi, Bengal Presidency, India
- Burial place: Rawalpindi War Cemetery
- Military career
- Allegiance: United Kingdom
- Branch: Indian Army
- Service years: 1909−1945
- Rank: General
- Commands: 3rd Battalion, 12th Frontier Force Regiment; Khojak Brigade; North Western Army
- Conflicts: World War I World War II
- Awards: Knight Commander of the Order of the Bath; Companion of the Order of the Star of India; Military Cross

General Sir Henry Finnis KCB CSI MC (21 April 1890 – 31 May 1945) was a British officer in the Indian Army.

== Military career ==
Born the son of Colonel Henry Finnis, CSI CBE RE, Finnis was educated at Wellington College and the Royal Military College, Sandhurst. He was commissioned on the unattached list for the Indian Army on 8 September 1909. He was appointed to the Indian Army's 72nd Punjabis on 12 November 1910; however he transferred to the 53rd Sikhs 22 February 1911.

During World War I, he served in Egypt from 17 November 1914 to 17 July 1915, Aden from 18 July 1915 to 9 September 1915, Egypt from 10 September 1915 to 1 December 1915 and Mesopotamia from 2 December 1915 to 6 May 1916. During this time, he was wounded, was mentioned in dispatches twice, and was awarded the Military Cross.

From November 1916 to May 1919, he was an instructor at the Wellington Cadet College in India. This was followed by a posting as brigade major from May to October 1919 during the Afghanistan and North West Frontier Operations. He transferred to the 52nd Sikhs (later 2nd Battalion of the 12th Frontier Force Regiment) in 1921. He also saw service during the Waziristan operations between 1921 and 1924, including being a General Staff Officer 2nd grade from 17 March 1922 to 1 June 1923.

He became commanding officer of the 3rd Royal Battalion of the 12th Frontier Force Regiment in November 1934. He went on to be instructor at Senior Officers' School in July 1936 and commander of the Khojak Brigade in May 1938.

He served in World War II as Military-Secretary at Army Headquarters, India from April 1940 and as General Officer Commanding-in-Chief North Western Army from 1943. He died in May 1945, aged 55, and was buried at Rawalpindi War Cemetery in Pakistan.

== Family ==
He married Cecile Violet D'Oyly O'Malley, only daughter of Colonel A. W. D'Oyly O'Malley, CB in 1917.

== Bibliography ==
- Smart, Nick (2005). Biographical Dictionary of British Generals of the Second World War. Barnesley: Pen & Sword. ISBN 1844150496.

Military offices
Preceded by Sir Edward Quinan	GOC-in-C, North Western Army, India; 1943 – 1945	Succeeded by Cecil Toovey
