= 25th Indian Infantry Brigade =

Infantry Brigade of the Indian army during World War II

- Active: 1941–1945
- Country: (British Raj) British India
- Allegiance: British Empire
- Branch: British Indian Army
- Type: Infantry
- Size: Brigade
- Engagements: Anglo-Soviet invasion of Iran; Western Desert Campaign; Italian Campaign

The 25th Indian Infantry Brigade was an infantry brigade formation of the Indian Army during World War II. It was formed in February 1941 at Ahmednagar in India and assigned to the 10th Indian Infantry Division. The brigade was attached to the 8th Indian Infantry Division in August 1941, and took part in the Anglo-Soviet invasion of Iran. Returning to the 10th Indian Division in August 1941, they arrived in the desert just in time for the Battle of Gazala and continued to fight in the Western Desert Campaign and later in the Italian Campaign. While in Italy the brigade was attached to the British 46th Infantry Division from 7 to 11 December 1944.

== Formation ==
- 2nd Battalion, 11th Sikh Regiment March 1941 to March 1942 and June to August 1942
- 3rd Battalion, 9th Jat Regiment March 1941 to January 1942
- 1st Battalion, 5th Mahratta Light Infantry April 1941 to April 1942
- 2nd Battalion, 8th Gurkha Rifles June to July 1941 and October to November 1944
- 13th Duke of Connaught's Own Lancers August 1941
- 1st Battalion, King's Own Royal Regiment (Lancaster) November 1941 to October 1943
- X Field Regiment, Royal Artillery May to June 1942
- 3rd Battalion, 5th Mahratta Light Infantry June 1942 to June 1943 and August 1944
- 164th Field Regiment, Royal Artillery June to August 1942
- 4th Battalion, 13th Frontier Force Rifles August 1942 to February 1943
- 3rd Battalion, 18th Royal Garhwal Rifles May 1943 to August 1945
- 8th Battalion, King's Own Royal Regiment (Lancaster) November 1943 to December 1944, merged with 1st Battalion
- 1st Battalion, King's Own Royal Regiment (Lancaster) January 1944 to August 1945
- 2nd Battalion, 3rd Gurkha Rifles August 1944
- Lovat Scouts August 1944 and March to April 1945
- 1st Battalion, 2nd Punjab Regiment August to September 1944
- 2nd Battalion, 4th Gurkha Rifles October 1944
- 4th Battalion, 10th Baluch Regiment October 1944
- 4th Battalion, 11th Sikh Regiment January to April 1945
- 3rd Battalion, 1st Punjab Regiment February to August 1945
- 2nd Battalion, Highland Light Infantry March to April 1945

== Officers commanding ==
The following officers commanded the brigade during the war.

Brigadier R.G. Mountain (February 1941 to July 1942)
Brigadier A.E. Arderne (July 1942 onwards)

== See also ==
- List of Indian Army Brigades in World War II
