= 21st Indian Infantry Brigade =

Infantry Brigade of the Indian army during World War II

- Active: 1940–1945
- Country: (British Raj) British India
- Allegiance: British Empire
- Branch: British Indian Army
- Type: Infantry
- Size: Brigade
- Engagements: Anglo-Iraqi War; North African Campaign; Italian Campaign

Commanders
- Notable commanders: Sir Philip Christison

The 21st Indian Infantry Brigade was an infantry brigade formation of the Indian Army during World War II.

== History ==
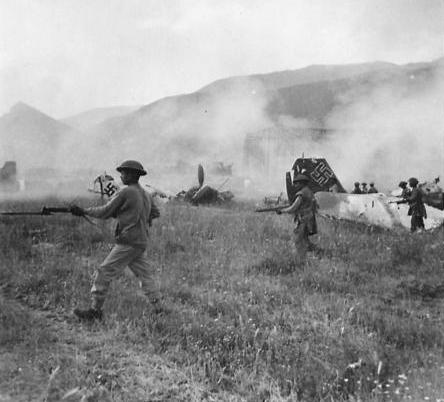
Indian troops of "Y" Company, 1st Battalion, 5th Mahratta Light Infantry, advancing under cover of smoke across the aerodrome. Wrecked planes and hangars can be seen through the smoke. Aquino, Italy, 25 May 1944.

It was converted from the Quetta Brigade in September 1940, and assigned to the 9th Indian Infantry Division. In March 1941, it was transferred to the 10th Indian Infantry Division and took part in the Anglo-Iraqi War in May 1941. The brigade then moved to Egypt and came under the command of the British Eighth Army between July and November 1942. It returned to Iraq, assigned to the 8th Indian Infantry Division, in November 1942 and moved with it to Damascus in March 1943. In September the division arrived in Taranto in southern Italy and the brigade remained with the 8th Indian Division throughout the rest of the Italian Campaign apart from short attachments to the British 78th Infantry Division in November 1943, and the British 6th Armoured Division between April and May 1944.

== Formation ==
- 2nd Battalion, 10th Gurkha Rifles September 1940 to October 1941
- 2nd Battalion, 4th Gurkha Rifles September 1940 to March 1942
- 4th Battalion, 13th Frontier Force Rifles March 1941 to June 1942
- 3rd Battalion, 11th Sikh Regiment June 1941
- 157th Field Regiment, Royal Artillery June to July 1941
- 1st Battalion, Duke of Cornwall's Light Infantry December 1941 to July 1942
- 1st Battalion, 6th Rajputana Rifles June to November 1942
- ?8th Gurkha Rifles June 1942 to January 1943
- 1st Battalion, Argyll and Sutherland Highlanders July to August 1942
- 3rd Battalion, 7th Rajput Regiment September to December 1942
- 1st Battalion, 5th Mahratta Light Infantry November 1942 to August 1945
- 5th Battalion, Queen's Own Royal West Kent Regiment November 1942 to June 1945
- 3rd Battalion, 15th Punjab Regiment January to April 1943 and September 1943 to August 1945
- 1st King's Dragoon Guards August 1944
- 1st Battalion, Jaipur Infantry April to June 1945
- 9th Field Company, Indian Engineers June to July 1941

== Brigade commanders ==
The following officers commanded the brigade during the war.

Brigadier C.J. Weld (Sep 1940 - May 1942)
Brigadier J.J. Purves (May 1942 - Mar 1943)
Brigadier B.S. Mould (Mar 1943 - Aug 1945)

== See also ==
- List of Indian Army Brigades in World War II
