= Cecil Toovey =

British Indian Army officer

Cecil Toovey CB CBE MC*
- Born: 17 April 1891
- Died: 23 February 1954 (aged 62); Surrey, England
- Military career
- Allegiance: United Kingdom
- Branch: British Army; British Indian Army
- Service years: 1913−1947
- Rank: Major-General
- Service number: 125528
- Units: Middlesex Regiment; 82nd Punjabis; 1st Punjab Regiment
- Commands: 3rd Battalion, 1st Punjab Regiment; Rawalpindi District; North Western Army
- Conflicts: First World War; Second World War
- Awards: Companion of the Order of the Bath; Commander of the Order of the British Empire; Military Cross and Bar

Major-General Cecil Wotton Toovey, CB, CBE, MC & Bar (17 April 1891 – 23 February 1954) was a senior British Indian Army officer who commanded the North Western Army, India during the Second World War.

== Military career ==
Toovey was educated at Malvern College and commissioned as a second lieutenant into the 9th Battalion, Middlesex Regiment from the Inns of Court Officers Training Corps on 3 May 1913. He served with his regiment during the early part of the First World War before transferring to the Indian Army in 1917, where he was attached to the 82nd Punjabis. He was awarded the Military Cross (MC) for organising and leading a counterattack when in command of his battalion in 1919 on the North West Frontier.

After attending the Staff College, Quetta from 1924 to 1925, he was awarded a bar to his MC for gallantry during operations on the North West Frontier during 1930–31. He was appointed Commanding Officer (CO) of the 3rd Battalion, 1st Punjab Regiment in January 1937 then Deputy Assistant Adjutant-General at General Headquarters, India in April 1939.

He served in the Second World War as Indian Army Liaison Officer at Middle East Command from May 1940, Commanding Officer, Lines of Communication Eritrea from April 1941 and Deputy Adjutant General at GHQ India from October 1941. He went on to be General Officer Commanding (GOC) Rawalpindi District in November 1943 and General Officer Commanding-in-Chief (GOC-in-C) North Western Army in June 1945.

He reverted to command of the Rawalpindi District in October 1945. He retired in January 1947 and died on 23 February 1954.

== Bibliography ==
- Smart, Nick (2005). Biographical Dictionary of British Generals of the Second World War. Barnesley: Pen & Sword. ISBN 1844150496.

Military offices
Preceded by Sir Henry Finnis	GOC-in-C, North Western Army, India; June – October 1945	Succeeded by Sir Richard O'Connor
