= Operation Venezia =

Operation Venezia was a Second World War operation in which Erwin Rommel moved a large portion of his forces around Bir Hakeim, the southernmost part of the British Gazala Line, soon after the start of the Battle of Gazala.

Rommel activated the operation at 20:30 on 26 May 1942, after his reconnaissance confirmed the presence of strong British armoured formations north-east of Bir Hakeim. His encircling force consisted of 10,000 vehicles from the 15. and 21. Panzerdivisions, the Italian Ariete Armoured Division and the motorized elements of the German 90th Light Infantry Division.

The British forces were expecting Rommel to make an attack and, on intercepting a signal which contained the codeword "Venezia", assumed, incorrectly, that it was the name of the full operation. This mistake is often repeated in historical literature.
