= Edward Quinan =

British Army general (1885-1960)

Sir Edward Quinan KCB KCIE DSO OBE
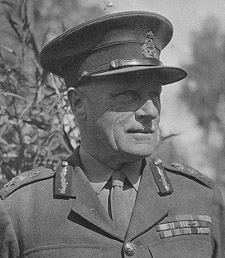
- Nicknames: "Quinan the Terror"
- Born: 9 January 1885; Calcutta, Bengal Presidency, British India
- Died: 13 November 1960 (aged 75) London, United Kingdom
- Allegiance: United Kingdom; British India
- Branch: British Army; British Indian Army
- Service years: 1905–1943
- Rank: General
- Service number: 181447
- Commands: North Western Army (1943); Tenth Army (1942–43); Iraqforce (1941–42); Western Independent District (Baluchistan and Sind) (1938–41); 9th (Jhansi) Brigade (1934–38); 3rd Battalion 8th Punjab Regiment (1930–32)
- Conflicts: First World War; North-West Frontier; Second World War; Anglo-Iraqi War; Anglo-Soviet invasion of Iran
- Awards: Knight Commander of the Order of the Bath; Knight Commander of the Order of the Indian Empire; Distinguished Service Order; Officer of the Order of the British Empire; Mentioned in Despatches

General Sir Edward Pellew Quinan, KCB, KCIE, DSO, OBE (9 January 1885 – 13 November 1960) was a British Army commander during the Second World War. In the early part of his career, he was involved in Indian Army campaigns in Afghanistan and Waziristan on the North West Frontier of the Indian Empire, in the days of the British Raj. During the First World War he served with the Indian Army forces in France and Mesopotamia, and was wounded. During the Second World War, Quinan commanded the British and Indian Army forces in the Anglo-Iraqi War, the Syria–Lebanon campaign, and the Anglo-Soviet invasion of Iran. He continued serving in the Middle East until 1943, when he returned to India to command the North West Army, but retired later the same year due to a downgrading of his fitness status.

== Early years and career in Indian Army ==
Quinan was of Anglo-Irish descent and was born in Calcutta on 9 January 1885; his father died when he was ten years old. Although his mother later remarried, he was brought up and educated in Dublin by his grandparents and aunts, until he entered the Royal Military College, Sandhurst, in 1903.

Commissioned a second lieutenant on 9 January 1904, Quinan joined the Indian Army (27th Punjabis) on 25 March 1905. He was promoted to lieutenant on 9 April of the following year. Before the First World War, he saw active service on the North West Frontier of the British Indian Empire and was promoted to captain on 9 January 1913. During the war he fought in France and Mesopotamia, and was appointed a provost marshal on 7 March 1915. He served at the battles of Neuve Chapelle, Loos and the attempt to relieve Kut al Amara; he was wounded at Beit Aisa. Appointed a GSO 3rd Grade on 10 May 1917, he was brevetted to major on 1 January 1918 and promoted to acting major on 2 November.

He returned to India and the Frontier and was a staff officer in the 1919 Afghan War and the subsequent campaign in Waziristan. On one occasion, the aircraft in which he was conducting reconnaissance crashed but he survived unhurt. He wrote the official history of the Waziristan campaign which is considered by military experts to be the model of a campaign history. He was appointed an Officer of the Order of the British Empire for his staff work during this campaign. In 1920, he attended Indian Army Staff College in Quetta which is now in Pakistan and served as DAQMG Meerut from 1923 to 1926. After attending the Senior Officers' School, Belgaum in 1927, he was posted to 3rd Battalion 8th Punjab Regiment (now 3 Baloch) in 1928.

In 1930, he rose to the command of 3rd Battalion 8th Punjab Regiment and was selected to attend the Imperial Defence College, an indication of his suitability for high command. While he was in command at Jhansi in 1930, Amy Johnson, the famous British pilot, made a heavy landing on the parade ground during her epic flight from London to Australia. Quinan was instrumental in getting her Gypsy Moth repaired.

As a colonel in 1933, he was appointed an instructor at the Staff College in Quetta. Among his immediate predecessors at the college was Auchinleck and his successor in 1934 was Montgomery. He then returned to Jhansi as a brigadier to command the 9th (Jhansi) Brigade.

In 1936, during the short reign of King Edward VIII, Quinan was appointed Aide-de-camp Brigadier to the King Emperor and was appointed a Companion of the Order of the Bath. He was posted to Dacca to assist in anti-terrorist operations against those fighting for Indian independence. In 1937, he commanded his troops in the campaign against the Faqir of Ipi in Waziristan and was awarded the Distinguished Service Order. He was promoted to major-general at the end of 1937 but in March 1938 he was forced to take sick leave due to high blood pressure and convalesced in Osborne House before being declared fit again for active service in July 1938 to take up command of the Western Independent District.

== Second World War service in the Middle East ==
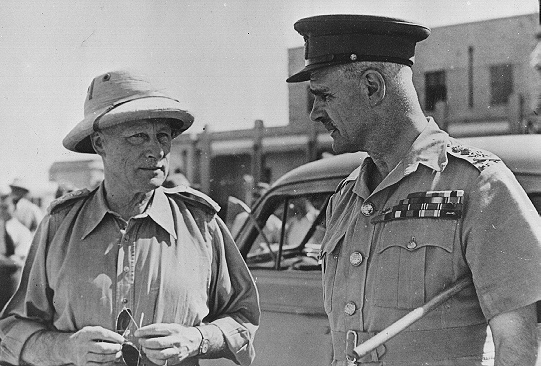
Generals Wavell and Quinan (left) meet in the Middle East

Quinan spent the early years of the Second World War on the North West Frontier but in March 1941, he was promoted to lieutenant-general, consulted General Sir Archibald Wavell in Cairo and was sent to command the Indian Army Corps in the landing at Basra, Iraq, and was appointed GOC British Troops in Iraq (Iraqforce).

At that time, the pro-German government of Iraq led by Rashid Ali al-Kaylani had tried to capture the RAF base at Habbaniya and force the British to leave the country. During the short Anglo-Iraqi War, Quinan's invasion from the south, supported by British troops from Trans-Jordan overthrew the Axis-leaning Iraqi government and replaced it with a pro-British one. He became GOC 10th Army in Persia and Iraq Command. As the Luftwaffe had used bases in Syria to support the Iraqis, an operation was planned to invade Syria from Palestine, supported by Quinan's troops in Iraq and replace the Vichy French government of Syria and Lebanon with a Free French one. This was completed successfully. Later in 1941, he planned and executed the invasion of Persia. The principal reason for this was to secure the supply lines to the Soviet Union and to protect British oil installations in Abadan. Reza Pahlavi, Shah of Iran, was considered to be pro-German so he was deposed and replaced by his son, Mohammad Reza Pahlavi.

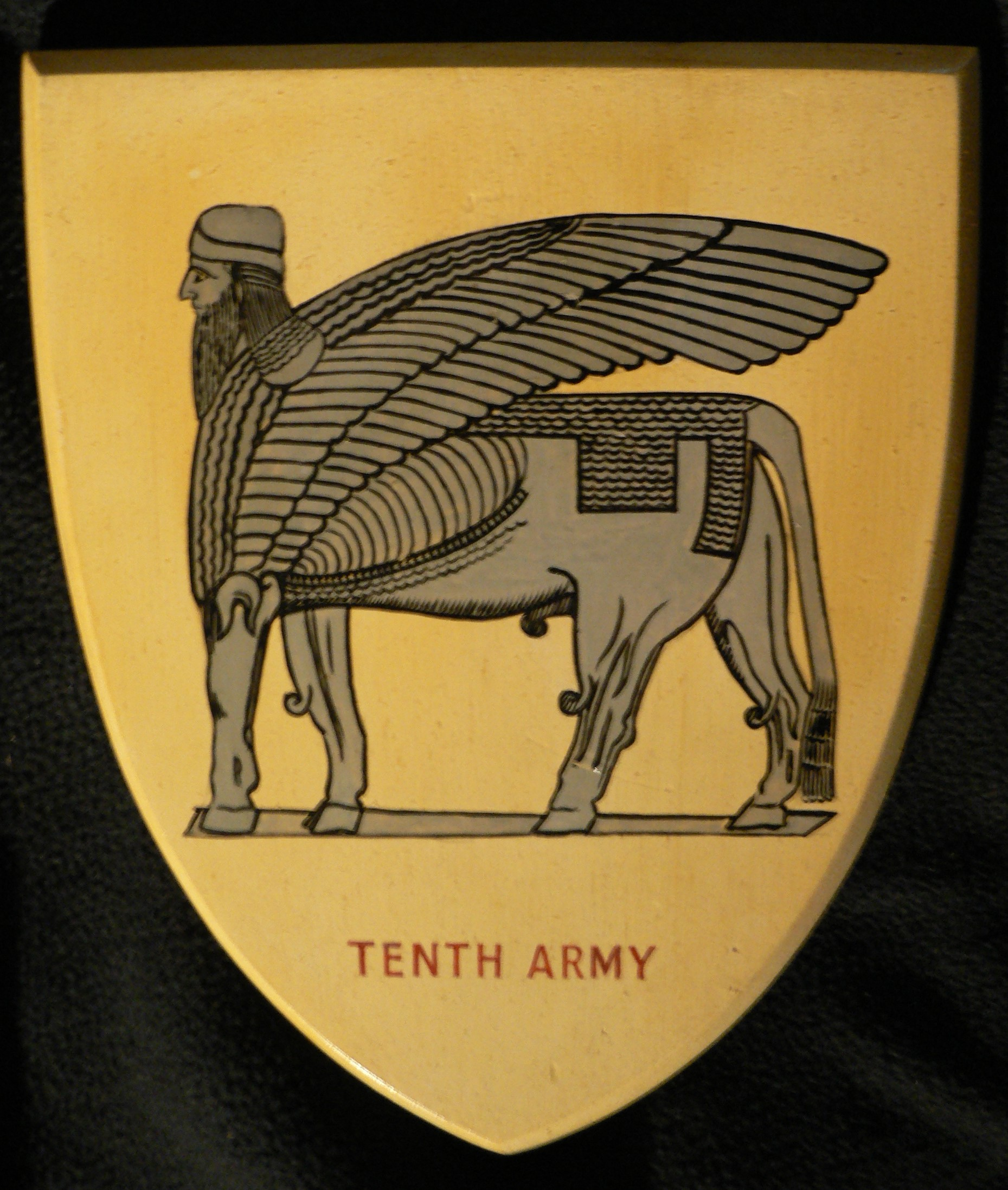
10th Army insignia

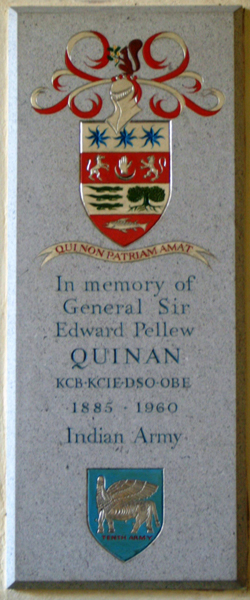
Memorial plaque in Barrington Church for General Sir Edward Quinan

Quinan's command, designated Tenth Army in February 1942 was built up as German forces advancing into the Soviet Union began to pose a threat. By the end of 1942 he had 8 divisions and two independent brigades under command (organised into two Corps) as well as the nascent Polish Corps being formed with Polish PoWs released by the Russians. He was knighted in the birthday honours of 1942 and made Knight Commander of the Order of the Indian Empire and in August 1942, he was promoted to be a full general.

The German threat receded following their defeat at Stalingrad and Quinan's command began to shrink. By the second quarter of 1943 an Army headquarters was no longer required to control the reduced fighting contingent and Tenth Army HQ was closed. In his War Diaries, the CIGS, General Sir Alan Brooke wrote on 4 August 1942, while working on reorganizing the Middle East and Persia and Iraq Commands, "Quinan unsuitable for 10th Army to be replaced..."

However, it was not until April 1943 that Quinan left the Middle East and was appointed GOC-in-C North Western Army, India. On 16 November 1943, he retired for medical reasons, a recurrence of his previous problem of high blood pressure, and returned to Britain. In November 1945, he was appointed as Colonel of the 8th Punjab Regiment. In the 1946 New Year's Honours, he was appointed a Knight Commander of the Order of the Bath. He retired to Barrington, Somerset, and died on 13 November 1960.

== Assessment ==
Quinan's renowned attention to detail was noted in his Times obituary which recorded that he "astonished, and sometimes appalled his subordinates by his meticulous attention to the duties of the smallest units under his command".

== Bibliography ==
- Mead, Richard (2007). Churchill's Lions: A biographical guide to the key British generals of World War II. Stroud (UK): Spellmount. ISBN 978-1-86227-431-0.

Military offices
Preceded by Sir Cyril Noyes	GOC-in-C, North Western Army, India; May 1943 – August 1943	Succeeded by Sir Henry Finnis
