= 20th Indian Infantry Brigade =

Infantry Brigade of the Indian army during World War II

- Active: 1939–1943
- Country: (British Raj) British India
- Allegiance: British Empire
- Branch: British Indian Army
- Type: Infantry
- Size: Brigade
- Engagements: Anglo-Iraqi War; Syria-Lebanon Campaign; Anglo-Soviet invasion of Iran; Western Desert Campaign; Italian Campaign

The 20th Indian Infantry Brigade was an infantry brigade formation of the Indian Army during World War II.

== History ==
The brigade was formed in September 1940, by the conversion of the Khojak Brigade and assigned to the 9th Indian Infantry Division. In April 1941, they were transferred to the 10th Indian Infantry Division and took part in the Anglo-Iraqi War, Syria-Lebanon campaign and the Anglo-Soviet invasion of Iran. Moving to Egypt in June 1942, the brigade was overrun and largely destroyed at Gambut 18 June 1942. The brigade was reformed in the Nile Delta and returned to the 10th Division. The brigade then took part in the Italian Campaign with 10th Division and ended the war in Italy.

== Order of battle ==
- 2nd Battalion, 7th Gurkha Rifles September 1940 to July 1941 and September 1941 to April 1942
- 3rd Battalion, 11th Sikh Regiment September 1940 to June 1941
- 2nd Battalion, 8th Gurkha Rifles October 1940 to June 1941, July 1941 to January 1942 and October to November 1944
- 1st Battalion, King's Own Royal Regiment (Lancaster) June 1941
- 2nd Battalion, 4th Gurkha Rifles June 1941
- 3rd Field Regiment, Royal Artillery June to September 1941
- 5th Battalion, 13th Frontier Force Rifles June to July 1941
- 3rd Battalion, 11th Sikh Regiment August 1941 to March 1942
- 1st Battalion, South Wales Borderers December 1941 to August 1942
- 3rd Battalion, 18th Royal Garhwal Rifles March to July 1942
- 1st Battalion, 6th Rajputana Rifles April to June 1942
- 2nd Battalion, 11th Sikh Regiment August 1942 to October 1943
- 2nd Battalion, 3rd Gurkha Rifles January 1943 to August 1945
- 4th Battalion, 13th Frontier Force Rifles February to June 1943
- Mewar Bhopal Infantry June 1943
- 3rd Battalion, 5th Mahratta Light Infantry June 1943 to August 1945
- 8th Battalion, Manchester Regiment July 1943 to September 1944
- 1st Battalion, Royal Northumberland Fusiliers (machine gun) attached 30 October to 19 November 1943 for training on Cyprus
- 1st Battalion, 2nd Punjab Regiment October 1944 to May 1945
- Nabha Akal Infantry October 1944 to August 1945
- 2nd Battalion, Loyal Regiment (North Lancashire) May to August 1945

== Officers commanding ==
The following officers commanded the brigade during the war.

Brigadier D. Powell (September 1940 to March 1942)
Brigadier L.E. MacGregor (March 1942 to June 1943)
Brigadier J.B. MacDonald (June 1943 to end of war)

== See also ==
- List of Indian Army Brigades in World War II
