= Charles Joseph Weld =

Brigadier Charles Joseph Weld CIE MC (4 February 1893 – 1962) was an officer in the British Indian Army during World War I, the interwar years and World War II.

Weld graduated from the Royal Military College, Sandhurst on 24 August 1912 and was commissioned second lieutenant on the unattached list of the Indian Army. After a years attachment to a British regiment in India, he was posted to the 56th Punjabi Rifles (Frontier Force) on 8 November 1913 and was promoted to lieutenant 24 November 1914.

During World War I he saw service in Egypt 30 November 1914 to 10 August 1915, Aden 15 August to 9 October 1915, Egypt again 14 October 1915 to 20 November 1915, Mesopotamia 4 December 1915 to 15 March 1916 when he was wounded. He returned to duty back in Mesopotamia 31 July 1916 to 30 December 1917. His final campaign was in Palestine 13 January 1918 to 31 October 1918.

He was Mentioned in Despatches in the London Gazette 27 August 1918 and awarded the Military Cross (MC) in 1919 by which time he had been promoted to captain. In 1929, after attending the Staff College, Quetta from 1927 to 1928, he was promoted to major and after two staff postings (as Deputy Assistant Quartermaster General and Assistant Military Secretary) he was appointed second in command of the 2nd battalion 13th Frontier Force Rifles (which is what the 56th Punjabi Rifles (Frontier Force) he been renamed in the 1922 reforms) on 22 April 1934.

He was promoted to lieutenant-colonel 22 January 1936 and was appointed the commanding officer of the 2nd battalion 13th Frontier Force Rifles.

For his services in Waziristan on the North West Frontier of India during 1936-37 he was mentioned in despatches.

He was appointed officiating General Staff Officer, 1st grade for Waziristan District on 9 March 1938, an appointment that was made permanent on 17 September 1938. It was a post he was to hold until 22 April 1940.

He was promoted to brevet Colonel 17 September 1938 and to full colonel in December 1939, with seniority from 17 September 1938.

Appointed temporary brigadier 23 April 1940. Weld commanded the 21st Indian Brigade of the Indian 10th Infantry Division (part of Iraqforce) during the Anglo-Iraqi War and the Syria–Lebanon campaign. 21st Indian Brigade was attached to Hazelforce during the Anglo-Soviet invasion of Persia and Weld was mentioned in despatches for his services in Persia and Iraq.

On 18 May 1942, Weld was promoted to local Major-General. He was appointed General Officer Commanding, Cyprus from 18 May to 28 August 1942.

From 23 October 1943 to 14 August 1945 Weld held the honorary appointment of Aide-de-camp to the King.

Weld was appointed a Commander of the Order of the Indian Empire (CIE) in the 1945 New Year Honours when commanding the Rawalpindi Area as a temporary brigadier and retired from the army 15 August 1946 with the substantive rank of colonel but was accorded the honorary rank of brigadier.

== Command history ==
- 1938–1940: General Staff Officer 1, Waziristan District, India
- 1940–1942: Commanding Officer, 21st Indian Brigade, Indian 10th Infantry Division, Middle East
- 1942: General Officer Commanding, Cyprus
- 1943: District Officer Commanding, Meerut District, India
- 1943–1945: Commanding Officer, Rawalpindi Area, India
- 1945–1946: Indian Army Liaison Officer to Indian Office
- 1946: Retired with honorary rank of Brigadier

== See also ==
- Iraqforce

== Bibliography ==
- Smart, Nick (2005). Biographical Dictionary of British Generals of the Second World War. Barnesley: Pen & Sword. ISBN 1844150496.
