= Donald Powell =

British Indian army officer

Donald Powell DSO (21 October 1896 – 8 August 1942) was an officer in the British Indian Army during World War I and World War II

== Biography ==
Donald Powell was born on 21 October 1896, at Jhansi and baptised on 4 January 1897, at Fatehgahr, the son of Richard John Powell of the Indian Public Works Department.

He was educated at Bedford School from 1908 to 1914, and then attended the Royal Military College, Sandhurst from where he was first commissioned on 11 November 1914 as a Second Lieutenant on the Unattached List for the Indian Army. On 25 January 1915 he was appointed as a company officer to the 1st Battalion, 30th Punjabis. He subsequently took part in the Mohmand campaign, August to October 1915.

He served in East Africa with the 30th Punjabis 1 December 1916 to December 1917. He was wounded and received the Croix de Guerre.

He was promoted to Captain on 11 November 1918, brevet Major 1 July 1929, and Major 11 November 1932, and held appointments as A.D.C. to the Governor of Madras, and as General Staff Officer 3rd grade at the India Office in London from 4 April 1932 to 6 September 1932.

On 3 July 1937 Powell was promoted to the rank of Lieutenant-Colonel and appointed to the command of his battalion, now called the 1st battalion, 16th Punjab regiment. In October 1937 the 1/16 Punjab Regiment was assigned to the 3rd (Jhelum) Brigade, at Ghariom, and the following month the Brigade moved to Mir Ali, with posts at Tal and Damdil, to protect the road to Razmak.

In April 1938 the Fakir assembled a large lashkar (tribal raiding party) at Mami Rogha, which proceeded to raid convoys on the Bannu-Razmak road and blockade the Tochi Scout post at Datta Khel. To deal with this threat, 3rd Brigade advanced to Dosalli and joined the Razmak Brigade to form a force called 'Wastrike', and Powell, having been appointed Acting Brigadier, assumed command of the Brigade.

On 18 July 'Wastrike' was dispersed and he relinquished the rank of acting Brigadier.

During the operations in Waziristan in 1938 total casualties amounted to 62 killed and 268 wounded. Lieutenant-Colonel Powell was awarded the D.S.O. and mentioned in despatches.

On 16 March 1940 Powell was again appointed Temporary Brigadier, commanding 20 (Indian) Brigade, consisting of 2/8 Gurkha Rifles, 2/7 Gurkha Rifles and 3/11 Sikh Regiment. The Brigade formed part of the 10th Indian Division, commanded by Major-General W. A. K. Fraser, then, from May 1941, Major-General William Slim.

As part of Iraqforce (or Paiforce in Persia), Brigadier Powell commanded the 20th Indian Brigade of the Indian 10th Infantry Division during the Anglo-Iraqi War, the Syria–Lebanon campaign, and the Anglo-Soviet invasion of Persia.

Brigadier Powell relinquished command of 20 Indian Brigade in March 1942 and returned to England.

He died on 8 August 1942 at a military hospital and was buried at Bedford Cemetery, Bedfordshire.

== Command history ==
- 1937–1939: Commanding Officer, 1st Battalion 16th Punjab Regiment
- 1940–1942: Commanding Officer, 20th Indian Brigade

== See also ==
- Iraqforce
- London Gazette, DSO during operations in Waziristan 1937_1938
- Generals of World War II
