= Ronald Gervase Mountain =

British Indian Army officer in both world wars

Brigadier Ronald Gervase Mountain (16 January 1897 – 1983) was an officer in the British Indian Army during World War I and World War II.

== Biography ==
Mountain was born in Caistor, Lincolnshire on 16 January 1897.

He attended Quetta Cadet College in India and was commissioned a Second Lieutenant on the Unattached List for the Indian Army on 15 November 1915. He was appointed to the Indian Army 17 November 1915.

He was initially posted to the 127th Queen Mary's Own Baluch Light Infantry but by 1916 he was attached to 2nd battalion 124th Duchess of Connaught's Own Baluchistan Infantry. He was promoted Lieutenant 15 November 1916.

He served in Mesopotamia between 28 August 1916 and 21 May 1918 and won the Military Cross. He was promoted Acting Captain 11 September to 17 October 1917 and 28 November 1917 to 12 January 1918.

He was then attached to 3rd battalion, 153rd Rifles in Palestine and served there from 5 June to 21 October 1918.

He was posted to the 130th King George's Own Baluchis on 9 March 1919, and promoted Captain 15 November 1919. After 1922 the 130th King George's Own Baluchis were renamed the 5th battalion, 10th Baluch regiment.

He saw much action on the North West Frontier, firstly in Waziristan 1921–24, then the North West Frontier operations of 1930.

He was appointed a Company Commander on 30 August 1931 and promoted Major 15 November 1933.

He saw action during the Mohmand operations of 1933 and was Mentioned in Despatches and awarded the DSO. He was again in action during the North West Frontier operations of 1936–37.

He was promoted Lieut-Colonel and commanding officer of the 10th battalion, 10th Baluch regiment 17 July 1938, a position he held until January 1941.

He was promoted Acting Brigadier 1 February 1941 and appointed to command the 25th Indian Brigade of the newly raised Indian 10th Infantry Division

As part of Iraqforce, he commanded the brigade attached to Indian 10th Infantry Division during the Anglo-Iraqi War and the Syria-Lebanon campaign.

As part of Paiforce, he commanded the 25th Indian Brigade attached to the Indian 8th Infantry Division during the Anglo-Soviet invasion of Persia.

When the Indian 10th Infantry Division was moved to North Africa in June 1942 he commanded the 25th Indian Brigade stationed at Gambut, halfway between Halfaya and Tobruk. They then retreated to Mersa Matruh where on 26 June they turned to fight. They were bypassed by the enemy and on 28 June the division was ordered to break out. Soon after Brigadier Mountain was taken prisoner of war.

He was first interned in Italy then in 1943 was transferred to Germany, where he was held at Oflag XII-B in Hadamar. There he served as Senior British Officer.

He was promoted Colonel on 1 June 1945 with seniority from 17 July 1941.

He was Mentioned in Despatches in recognition of gallant and distinguished services as a Prisoner of War in January 1946.

He retired a Colonel and honorary Brigadier on 6 July 1947.

== Command history ==
- 1938–1941: Commanding Officer, 10th battalion, 10th Baluch regiment
- 1941–1942: Commanding Officer, 25th Indian Brigade

== See also ==
- Iraqforce
