= 11th Sikh Regiment =

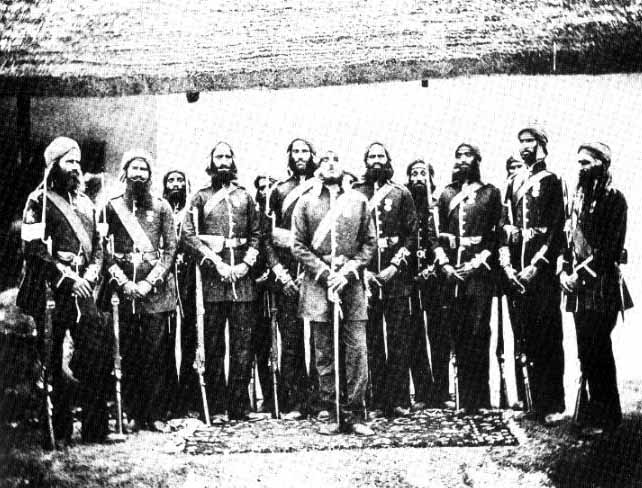
- The Ludhiana Sikh Regiment in China, Circa 1860, during the Second Opium War
- Active: 1922–1947
- Country: British India
- Branch: British Indian Army
- Type: Infantry
- Size: Regiment
- Engagements: World War II

The 11th Sikh Regiment was an infantry regiment of the British Indian Army. They could trace their origins to 1922, when after World War I the Indian government reformed the army moving from single battalion regiments to multi battalion regiments. The regiment was formed from the:

- 1st Battalion – 14th King George's Own Ferozepore Sikhs
- 2nd Battalion – 15th Ludhiana Sikhs
- 3rd Battalion – 45th Rattray's Sikhs
- 4th Battalion – 36th Sikhs
- 5th Battalion – 47th Sikhs
- 10th Training Battalion – 35th Sikhs

During World War II a further seven infantry battalions were formed the 6th, 7th, 8th, 9th, 14th, 25th and a machine gun battalion. The 8th and 9th battalions were converted to Light Anti-Aircraft battalions.

Captain Yavar Abbas enlisted in the regiment during the Second World War; he said of the regiment's British officers "I found myself in a version of Dad's Army, in the company of white, middle-aged men as my fellow officers, who still considered India to be a crown colony on which they'll have continuing control for the foreseeable future," and transferred to the Fourteenth Army, of which he said "It was wonderful camaraderie. There were British and Indians mixing with each other."

The regiment was allocated to the new Indian Army on independence, becoming the Sikh Regiment.

== Bibliography ==
- Barthorp, Michael; Burn, Jeffrey (1979). Indian infantry regiments 1860–1914. Osprey Publishing. ISBN 0-85045-307-0.
- Sumner, Ian (2001). The Indian Army 1914–1947. Osprey Publishing. ISBN 1-84176-196-6.
