= 13th Frontier Force Rifles =

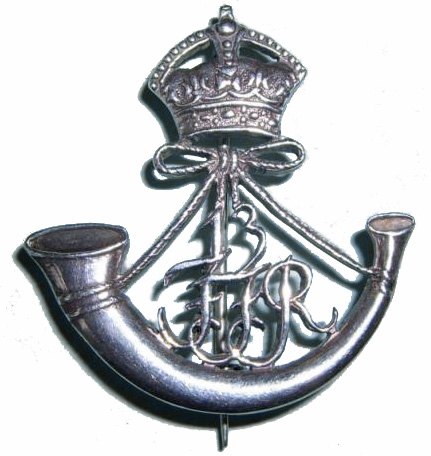
- Active: 1922–1956
- Country: British India; Pakistan
- Branch: British Indian Army; Pakistan Army
- Type: Infantry
- Regimental Centre: Abbottabad
- Uniform: Rifle green; faced scarlet
- Engagements: North West Frontier of India; Indian Mutiny 1857–58; Second Afghan War 1878–80; Boxer Rebellion 1900; Somaliland 1902–03; First World War 1914–18; Third Afghan War 1919; Second World War 1939–45; Kashmir War 1948

Commanders
- Colonel-in-Chief: George V
- Colonel Commandant: Field Marshal The Lord Birdwood

The 13th Frontier Force Rifles was part of the British Indian Army, and after 1947, Pakistan Army. It was formed in 1922 by amalgamation of five existing regiments and consisted of five regular battalions. In 1947, it was allocated to the Pakistan Army.

== History ==
The 13th Frontier Force Rifles' origins lie in the five regiments of infantry raised in 1849 by Colonel Henry Lawrence, the agent (and brother) of the Governor-General of the Punjab frontier region (John Lawrence, 1st Baron Lawrence) from veterans of disbanded opposition forces after the Second Anglo-Sikh War. The regiments were named the 1st, 2nd, 3rd, 4th and 5th Punjab Infantry Regiments and became part of the Transfrontier Brigade (renamed in 1851 the Punjab Irregular Force, known as Piffers). A sixth regiment was added in 1865 on re-designation of the Scinde Rifle Corps, which had originally been raised as the Scinde Camel Corps in 1843. In 1882, the 3rd Punjab Infantry Regiment was disbanded.

In the 1903 Kitchener reorganisation of the Indian Army, the regiments were redesignated and were afforded the status of Rifle Regiments:

- 1st Punjab Infantry Regiment became 55th Coke's Rifles (Frontier Force)
- 2nd Punjab Infantry Regiment became 56th Punjabi Rifles.
- 4th Punjab Infantry Regiment became 57th Wilde's Rifles.
- 5th Punjab Infantry Regiment became 58th Vaughan's Rifles (Frontier Force)
- 6th Punjab Infantry Regiment became 59th Scinde Rifles. In 1921, the regiment became 59th Royal Scinde Rifles (Frontier Force).

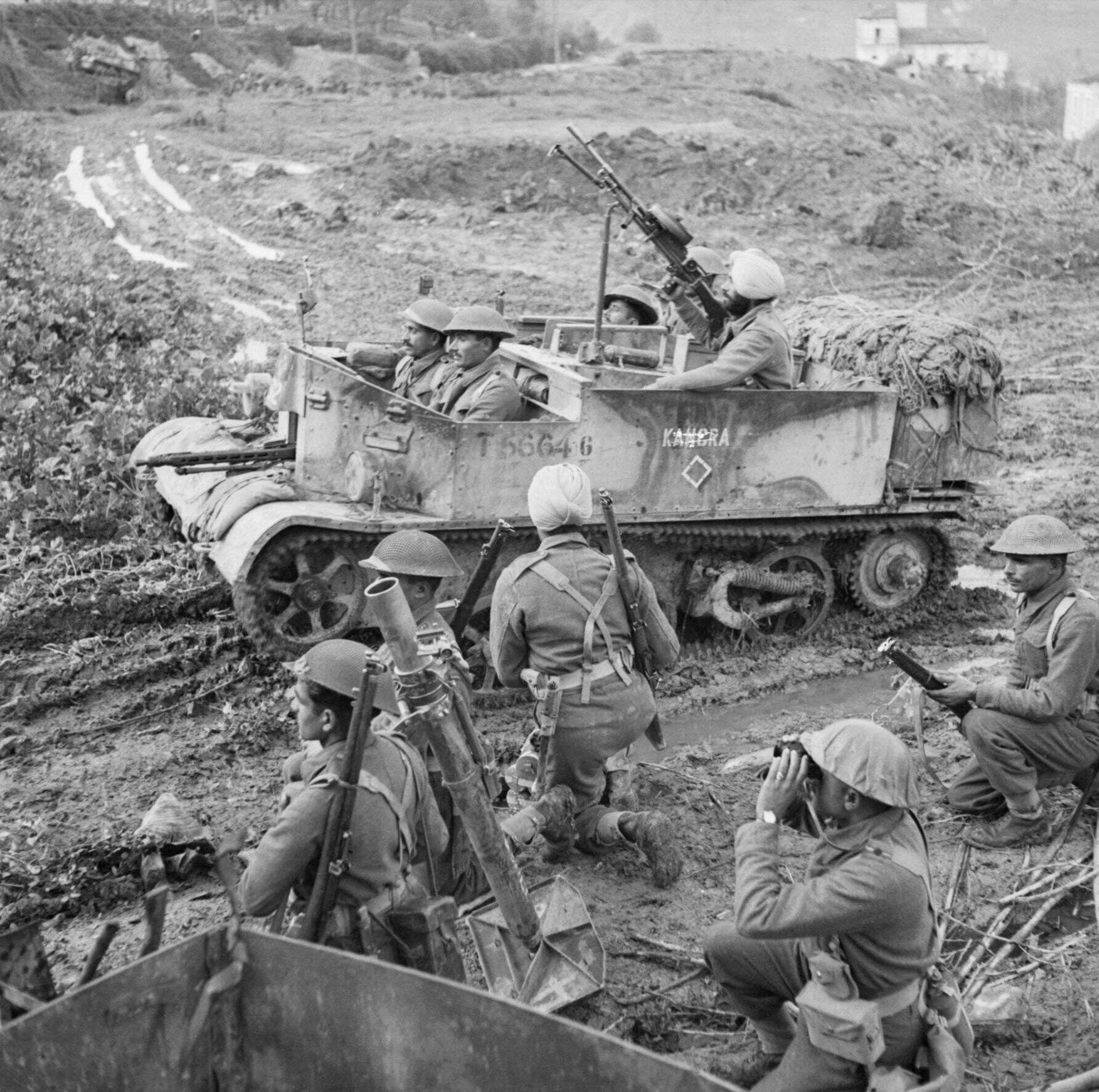
Universal Carrier and mortar team of the 6th Battalion, 13th Frontier Force Rifles, between Lanciano and Osogna on the central sector of the Eighth Army's front, 13 December 1943.

In the 1922 reorganisation of the British Indian Army, the five regiments became the five regular battalions of the newly formed 13th Frontier Force Rifles. The battalion numbering omitted a 3rd battalion so that the numbering reflected that of the original antecedent Punjab Infantry Regiments.

In 1945, the regiment was renamed The Frontier Force Rifles when all the regiments of the British Indian Army dropped their prenominal numbers. On independence in 1947, the regiment was allocated to Pakistan. In 1956, The Frontier Force Rifles, The Pathan Regiment and the Frontier Force Regiment were amalgamated to form the new Frontier Force Regiment.

== Battle honours ==
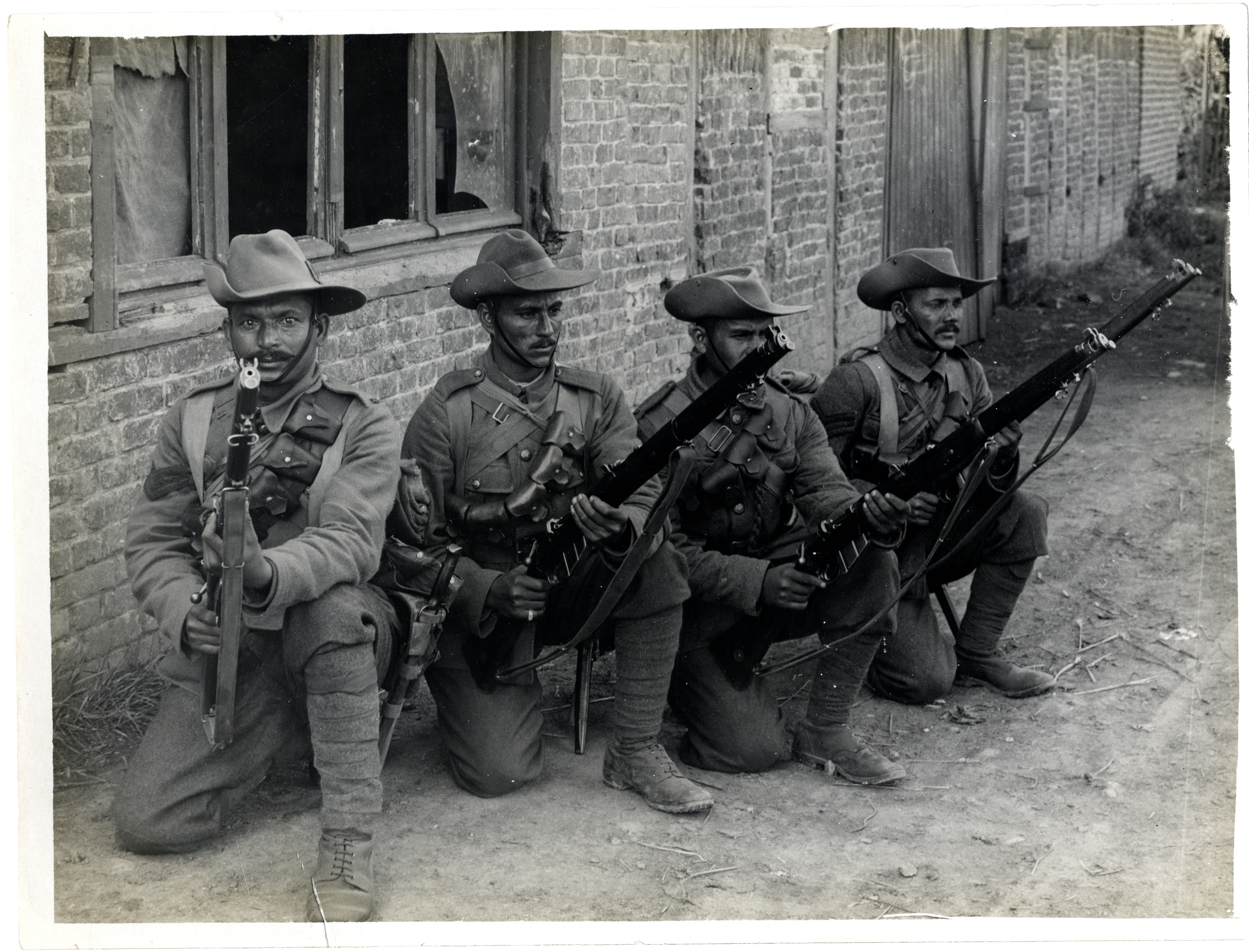
Typical 13th Frontier Force riflemen (Estaires-La Bassée Road, France). Photographer- H. D. Girdwood. (13875264813)

Delhi 1857, Lucknow, Peiwar Kotal, Charasiah, Kabul 1879, Afghanistan 1878–80, Tirah, Punjab Frontier, China 1900, La Bassée 1914, Messines 1914, Armentières 1914, Festubert 1914, Givenchy 1914, Neuve Chapelle, Ypres 1915, St. Julien, Aubers, Festubert 1915, Loos, France and Flanders 1914–15, Suez Canal, Egypt 1915–17, Gaza, El Mughar, Nebi Samwil, Jerusalem, Megiddo, Sharon, Palestine 1917–18, Tigris 1916, Kut al Amara 1917, Baghdad, Mesopotamia 1916–18, Persia 1918–19, Aden, East Africa 1916–18, NW Frontier India 1917, Baluchistan 1918, Afghanistan 1919, Gash Delta, Barentu, Keren, Ad Teclesan, Amba Alagi, Abyssinia 1940–41, Deir ez Zor, Raqaa, Syria 1941, Gazala, Sidi Rezegh 1942, Gambut, Mersa Matruh, North Africa 1940–43, The Trigno, Tufillo, The Sangro, Impossible Bridge, Villa Grande, Cassino II, Gustav Line, Pignataro, Advance to Florence, Gothic Line, Monte Grande, The Senio, Bologna, Monte Sole, Italy 1943–45, North Malaya, Kota Bharu, Johore, Gemas, The Muar, Singapore Island, Malaya 1941–42, Pegu 1942, Taukkyan, Monywa 1942, Shwegyin, North Arakan, Point 551, Mayu Tunnels, Maungdaw, Ngakyedauk Pass, Imphal, Litan, Arakan Beaches, Myebon, Ramree, Mandalay, Myinmu, Meiktila, Nyaungu Bridgehead, Capture of Meiktila, Defence of Meiktila, Taungtha, Myingyan, The Irawaddy, Yenaungyaung 1945, Magwe, Rangoon Road, Pegu 1945, Sittang 1945, Burma 1942–45, Kashmir 1948.

== See also ==
- Frontier Force Regiment
- Punjab Irregular Force
