= 10th Infantry Division (India) =

Infantry Division of the Indian army during World War II

- Insignia of the 10th Infantry Division in the Second World War
- Active: 1941–1947; 1965–present
- Country: (British Raj) British India; India
- Allegiance: British Empire; India
- Branch: British Indian Army; Indian Army
- Type: Infantry
- Size: Division
- Garrison/HQ: Akhnoor
- Nickname: Crossed Swords Division
- Engagements: World War II: Anglo-Iraqi War; Syria–Lebanon campaign; Anglo-Soviet invasion of Iran; Western Desert campaign; Italian campaign; Indo-Pakistani War of 1965: Operation Grand Slam; Indo-Pakistani War of 1971: Battle of Chumb
- Battle honours: North Africa; Italy

Commanders
- Notable commanders: William Slim; Wilfrid Lloyd; Denys Reid

The 10 RAPID Division (erstwhile 10 Inf Division) was a war formed infantry division of the Indian Army during World War II. In four years, the division travelled over 4,000 miles (6,400 km) from Tehran to Trieste, fought three small wars, and fought two great campaigns: the Anglo-Iraqi War, the Invasion of Syria–Lebanon, the Anglo-Soviet invasion of Iran, the North African Campaign, and the Italian Campaign.

After the partition of India, the division was allocated to the Pakistan Army. The Pakistani 10 Infantry Division is part of the IV Corps and is located in Lahore. The division was re-raised on 1 April 1965 as part of the independent Indian Army at Bangalore and Belgaum in Karnataka as 10 Mountain Division.

== World War II ==
The division was formed in January 1941 at Ahmednagar, out of the 20th, 21st and 25th Indian Infantry Brigades. The first General Officer Commanding (GOC) of the division was Major-General W.A.K. Fraser. The division landed in Basra in April for the Anglo-Iraqi War. On 16 May 1941 Major General William "Bill" Slim took over command of the division and moved up the Euphrates, capturing Baghdad and the oilfields of Mosul. When Iraq's ally Nazi Germany relocated its aircraft to Vichy French Syria, the 10th invaded Syria from Iraq in June. The 21st Brigade advanced towards Aleppo, while the 20th and 25th Brigades guarded the communication lines and the Mosul oilfield, respectively. Following the French surrender on 11 July, the division returned to guard duty in Mosul. In August, the division took part in the joint Anglo-Soviet invasion of Iran. At the conclusion of the Iranian operation, it returned to Iraq, where it underwent additional training and undertook security duties until May 1942. In March 1942, command of the division passed from Slim to Major General Thomas "Pete" Rees when Slim was ordered to India to take command of Burma Corps, the kernel that would eventually become the British Fourteenth Army.

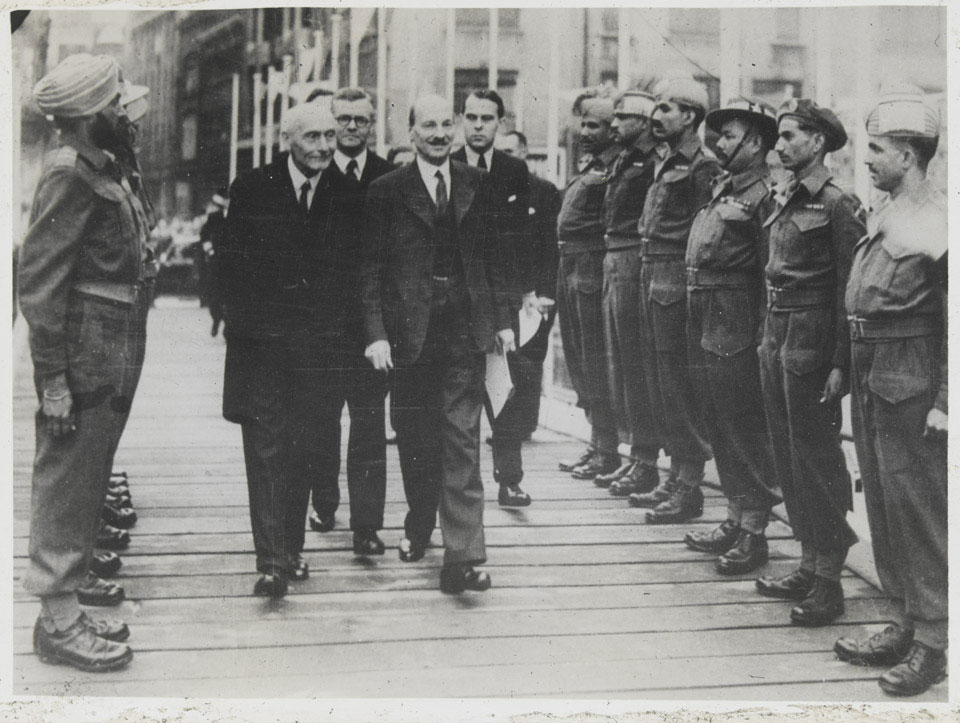
Clement Attlee meets representatives of the 10th Indian Division, 1945.

We had scrambled thought skirmishes of the Iraq rebellion, been bloodied, but not too deeply, against the French in Syria, and enjoyed the unrestrainedly opéra bouffe of the invasion of Persia. We had bought our beer in Haifa and drunk it on the shores of the Caspian. We could move, we could fight, and we had begun to build up that most valuable of all assets a tradition of success. We had a good soldierly conceit of ourselves. Now in March 1942, in spite of dust storms ...it was stimulating to be in what we all felt was a critical spot, waiting for the threatened German invasion of Turkey.

— Slim – Defeat into Victory

The division then moved on to North Africa, reaching Halfaya Pass on 4 June to take part in the Western Desert Campaign. Initially the 10th Indian Infantry Division was committed piecemeal with units involved at El Adem and Sidi Rezegh during the 1942 Battle of Gazala. In June the division, with the 2nd Free French Brigade under command, was ordered by Lieutenant General William Gott, the XIII Corps commander, to hold a position near the Egyptian border with Libya for 72 hours during the British Eighth Army's retreat to El Alamein. Major General Rees responded that the division had only just concentrated and that defensive works were as yet inadequate. He believed, therefore, that the division was unlikely to be able to withstand a full-scale attack from Erwin Rommel. Gott immediately visited Rees and relieved him of command of the division, telling him he lacked resolution. During its retreat from Libya, the division was tasked with defending the coastal town of Mersa Matruh. In the ensuing battle it was overwhelmed and forced to retreat. 60% of the men evaded capture, reaching the Allied lines at El Alamein the following day. Most of the survivors were sent to the Nile Delta to recover. However, part of the division formed the improvised Robcol formation (comprising a regiment each of field artillery and light anti-aircraft artillery and a company of infantry), which held the Ruweisat Ridge between 2–3 July during the First Battle of El Alamein.

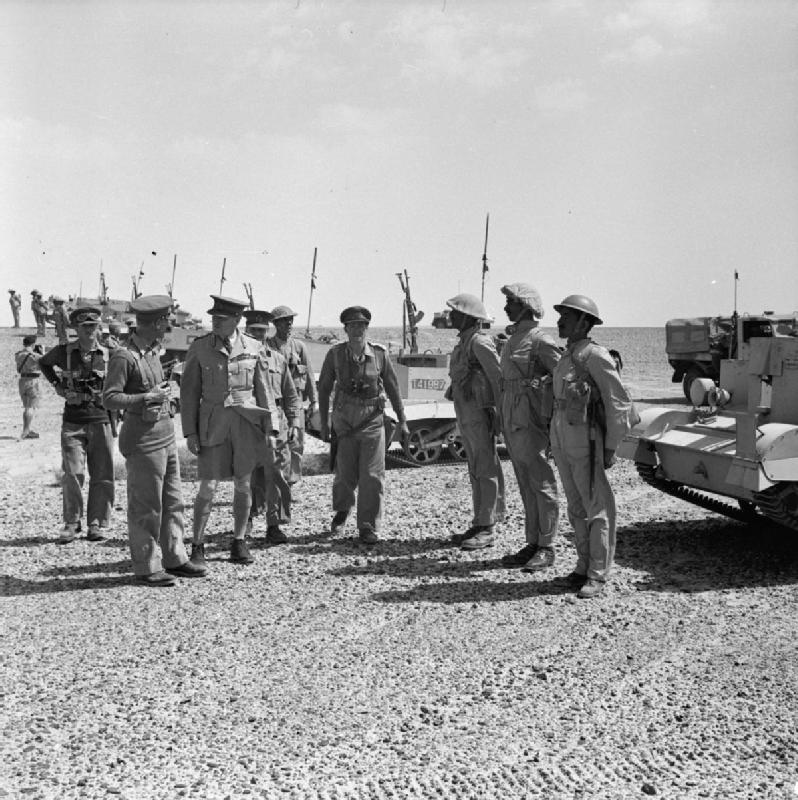
The Commander in Chief, General Auchinleck, inspecting Bren gun carrier crews of the Indian Tenth Army in Iraq, 18 April 1942.

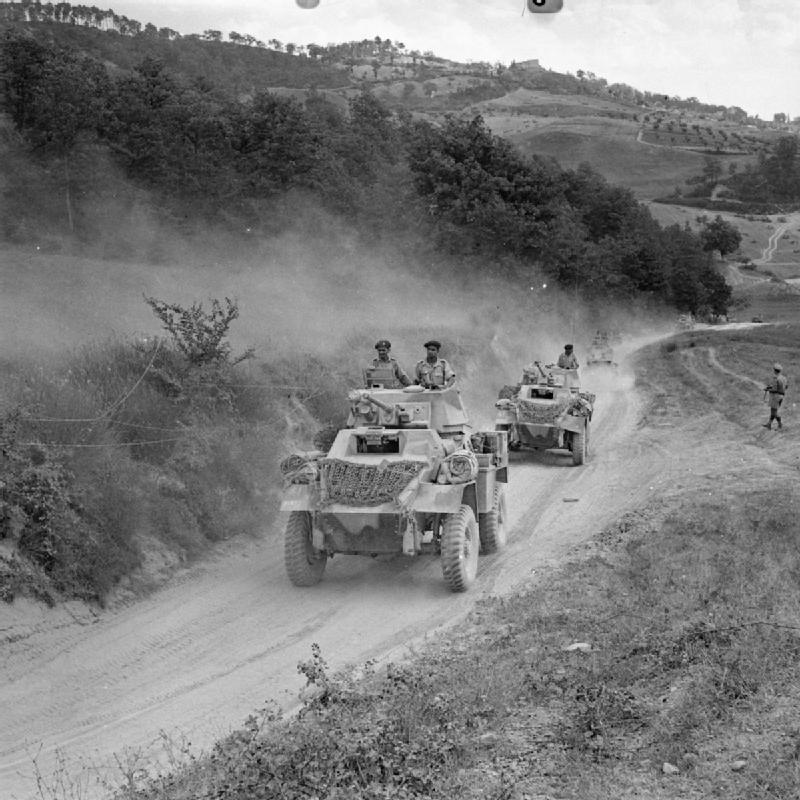
The 10th Indian Division in Italy, 22 July 1944.

In August, command passed to Major General Alan Bruce Blaxland while the division was sent to Cyprus with the responsibility of protecting the island. In July 1943, Major General Wilfrid Lewis Lloyd took command. In August, the 10th had relocated to the Middle East, now incorporating the 1st Greek Brigade, composed of royalist Greek and Yugoslavian troops along with the 20th and 25th Indian Brigades. During the summer it underwent training for a planned invasion of Rhodes, but the Allied defeat in the Dodecanese campaign put an end to those plans. In November it was placed on security duty in Lebanon. On 27 November, it began training for amphibious assault and mountain warfare in preparation for its role in the Italian Campaign. In January 1944, Lloyd was killed in a car accident while overseeing a training exercise in Egypt; command passed to Major General Denys Whitehorn Reid.

On 9 March 1944, the division was ordered to transfer to the Italian front. On 22 April, it relieved the 1st Canadian Division at the Ortona sector, which it held along with the 4th Indian Infantry Division. There it engaged in frequent patrols to prevent the enemy from sending reinforcement to the ongoing Battle of Monte Cassino. On 4 June, the division was moved to Venafro where it continued its training in mountain and urban warfare. The division returned to the front lines on 28 June, replacing the 8th Indian Infantry Division. Advancing through the Tiber Valley, the division occupied Umbertide on 2 July. Taking advantage of its training in mountain warfare, it went on to take Città di Castello and Montone, infiltrating deep into Axis positions and striking from the flanks and the rear. By 1 August, the division's vanguard had reached the north of the Tiber river's basin. Further advance was blocked by the Alpe di Catenaia heights, a solid block of ridges and peaks that could only be taken by a set piece assault. On 4 August, troops belonging to the 10th Division captured Monte Altuccia; two days later the Regina height was occupied. It was abandoned as the division had to replace the 4th Indian Infantry Division on its former front line sector which spanned 15 miles (24 km). On 19 August, the Alpe di Catenaia heights were finally overtaken by the 3/1st Punjabis. On 17 September, the unit was transferred to the Adriatic in an effort to penetrate the Gothic Line.

Numerous mountain battles and river crossings followed with Operation Olive on the Gothic Line and then Operation Grapeshot. The 10th Indian Infantry Division earned many battle honours and decorations and suffered many casualties before final victory in Italy and the end of World War II in Europe in May 1945. Security tasks on the Yugoslav border around Trieste completed the 10th Indian Division's war service.

The division was disbanded in January 1947; its last wartime commander, Major-General Reid, continuing to command it for the two years after the war.

=== Divisional commanders ===
From

- Major-General W.A.K. Fraser (January 1941 to May 1941)
- Major-General William Slim (May 1941 to March 1942)
- Major-General T.W. Rees (March 1942 to June 1942)
- Major-General J.S. Nichols (June 1942 to July 1942)
- Major-General A.B. Blaxland (July 1942 to July 1943)
- Major-General W.L. Lloyd (July 1943 to January 1944)
- Major-General D.W. Reid (January 1944 to 1947, retired mid-1947)

== Order of battle ==
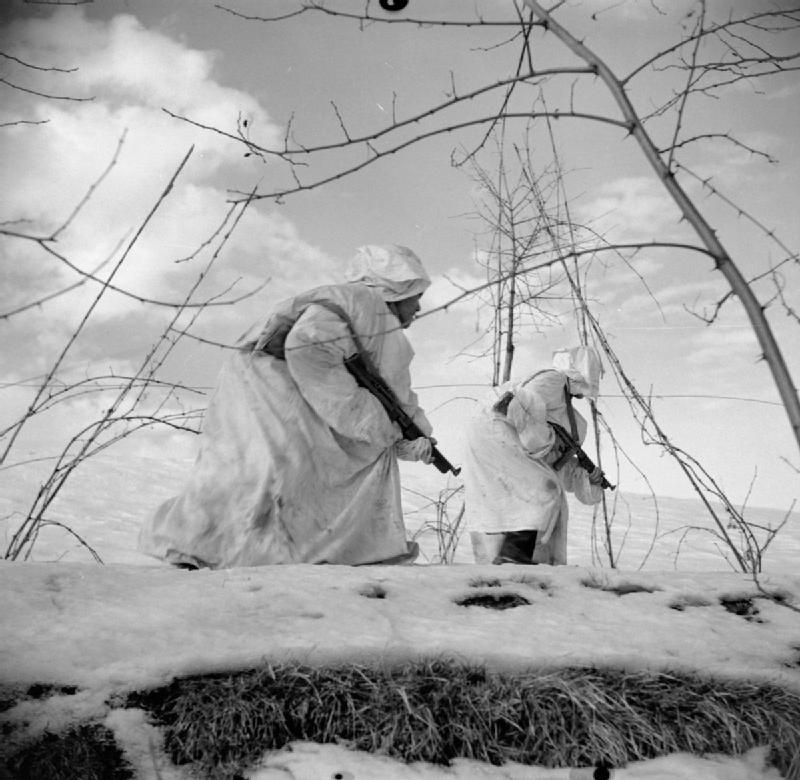
A patrol from No. 8 Platoon, 'C' Company of the 2nd Battalion, 3rd Gurkha Rifles advances cautiously through the snow, near Castel Bolognese, Italy, 23–24 January 1945.

=== 1941 ===
Prior to its piecemeal dispatch to Iraq, April 1941

- 20th Indian Infantry Brigade
  - 2nd Battalion, 8th Gurkha Rifles
  - 2nd Battalion, 7th Duke of Edinburgh's Own Gurkha Rifles
  - 3rd Battalion, 11th Sikh Regiment
- 21st Indian Infantry Brigade
  - 2nd Battalion, 10th Gurkha Rifles
  - 2nd Battalion, 4th Gurkha Rifles
  - 4th Battalion, 13th Frontier Force Rifles
- 24th Indian Infantry Brigade
  - 2nd Battalion, 6th Rajputana Rifles
  - The Kumaon Rifles
  - 5th Battalion, 5th Mahratta Light Infantry
- 25th Indian Infantry Brigade
  - 1st Battalion, 5th Mahratta Light Infantry
  - 2nd Battalion, 11th Sikh Regiment
  - 3rd Battalion, 9th Jat Regiment
- Division Troops
  - 6th Duke of Connaught's Own Lancers
- Royal Artillery
  - 3rd Field Regiment
  - 157th Field Regiment
- Indian Engineers
  - 9th and 61st Field Companies Queen Victoria's Own Madras Sappers and Miners
  - 41st Field Park Company Queen Victoria's Own Madras Sappers and Miners

=== 1944 ===
Italy, March 1944 – June 1945

- 10th Indian Infantry Brigade
  - 1st Battalion, 2nd Punjab Regiment (until 29 August 1944)
  - 1st Battalion, Durham Light Infantry (from May 1944)
  - 4th Battalion, 10th Baluch Regiment
  - 2nd Battalion, 4th Prince of Wales's Own Gurkha Rifles
- 20th Indian Infantry Brigade
  - 8th Battalion, Manchester Regiment (until Oct 1944)
  - 1st Battalion, 2nd Punjab Regiment (from Oct 1944 to May 1945)
  - 2nd Battalion, Loyal Regiment (North Lancashire) (from May 1945)
  - 3rd Battalion, 5th Mahratta Light Infantry
  - 2nd Battalion, 3rd Queen Alexandra's Own Gurkha Rifles
- 25th Indian Infantry Brigade
  - 1st Battalion, King's Own Royal Regiment (Lancaster)
  - 3rd Battalion, 1st Punjab Regiment
  - 3rd Battalion, 18th Royal Garhwal Rifles
  - 4th Battalion, 11th Sikh Regiment (from January 1945)
  - Royal Yugoslav Guards Battalion (from June 1943 to March 1944)
- Division troops
  - 1st Duke of York's Own Skinner's Horse (Divisional Reconnaissance Regiment)
  - 10th Indian Division Signals
  - 1st Battalion, Royal Northumberland Fusiliers (Machine Gun Battalion)
- Royal Artillery
  - 68th (South Midland) Field Regiment, Royal Artillery
  - 97th (Kent Yeomanry) Field Regiment, Royal Artillery
  - 154th (Leicestershire Yeomanry) Field Regiment, Royal Artillery
  - 13th Anti-Tank Regiment, Royal Artillery
  - 30th Light Anti-Aircraft Regiment, Royal Artillery (left November 1944)
- Indian Engineers
  - 5th Field Company King George's Own Bengal Sappers and Miners
  - 10th and 61st Field Companies Queen Victoria's Own Madras Sappers and Miners
  - 41st Field Park Company King George's Own Bengal Sappers and Miners
- Support Units
  - Royal Indian Army Service Corps
    - 10th Indian Division Troops Transport Company
    - 10th, 20th and 25th Brigade Transport Companies
    - 27th Animal Transport Company (Mule)
  - Indian Army Medical Corps
    - 14th, 21st and 30th Indian Field Ambulances
    - 12th Indian Field Hygiene Section
  - Corps of Military Police (India)
    - 10th Indian Division Provost Unit
  - Indian Army Ordnance Corps
    - 10th Indian Division Ordnance Field Park
  - Indian Electrical and Mechanical Engineers (IEME)
    - 125th, 126th and 127th Infantry Workshop Companies
    - 10th Indian Division Recovery Company
  - Indian General Service Corps
    - 10th Indian Divisional Field Post Office
    - 53rd Indian Field Post Office
  - Intelligence Corps (India)
    - 5th and 407th Indian Field Security Sections

== Assigned brigades ==
In addition to those listed above the following brigades were assigned or attached to the division for relatively short times during World War II.

- 1st Armoured Brigade (1–5 June 1942)
- 2nd Indian Armoured Brigade (Aug–Dec 1942)
- 7th Armoured Brigade (Nov 1944 – Jan 1945)
- 9th Armoured Brigade (Sept 1941)
- 252nd Indian Armoured Brigade (Jan 1942)
- 1st Guards Brigade (2–5 June 1942)
- 5th Indian Infantry Brigade (Jun–Jul 1942)
- 15th Indian Infantry Brigade (Feb–Mar 1941)
- 17th Indian Infantry Brigade (Jul–Aug 1941)
- 18th Indian Infantry Brigade (Jun 1942)
- 43rd (Lorried) Indian Infantry Brigade (Oct–Dec 1944)
- 234th Infantry Brigade (Aug–Sept 1943)

== Post re-raising ==
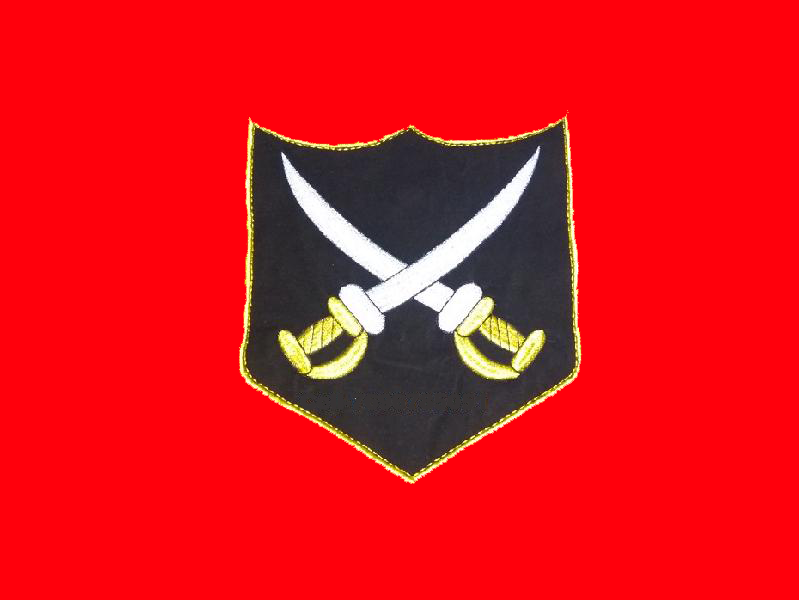
Flag of 10 Infantry Division, Indian Army

Soon after re-raising, with war clouds looming, the division under Major General Dharam Bir Chopra was moved to Chhamb-Jourian sector under XV Corps. Before it could settle down in its new location, the division was asked to move to the Akhnoor sector. The division at this time was re-designated as 10 Infantry Division. It was asked to take over operational command over 80 and 191 Infantry Brigades by 15 September 1965.

== Indo-Pakistani War of 1965 ==
Order of battle (ORBAT), as of 3 September 1965

- 191 Infantry Brigade
  - 6 Sikh Light Infantry
  - 15 Kumaon
  - 3 Mahar
  - 3 Jammu and Kashmir Militia
  - 3 Punjab Armed Police
  - 6/5 Gorkha Rifles
  - 9 Punjab (relieved 6/5 Gorkha Rifles on 1 September 1965)
  - 14 Field Regiment
  - 1 troop Medium Battery
  - 6 Rajput (from 163 Mountain Brigade)
- 28 Infantry Brigade (initially XV Corps reserve, part of 10 Division from 3 September 1965)
  - 2 Grenadiers
  - 5/8 Gorkha Rifles
  - 1/1 Gorkha Rifles
  - 161 Field Regiment
- 41 Mountain Brigade
  - 9 Mahar
  - 1/8 Gorkha Rifles
- 'C' Squadron 20 Lancers
- 38 Medium Regiment (1 battery)
- 39 Medium Regiment (1 battery)

Prior to the main operations, close to 1200 Pakistani irregulars infiltrated into this sector on 5 August 1965 as part of Operation Gibraltar. They captured a large number of posts along the Kalidhar and Nathua-Tibba-Laleali ridges. On 1 September 1965, as part of Operation Grand Slam, Pakistani forces launched an offensive in Akhnoor sector with three infantry brigades, two armoured regiments (with M48 Pattons and M-36 Sherman B-2 tank destroyers) and artillery support. This attack overwhelmed the two forward companies of 15 Kumaon and came to striking distance of HQ, 191 Infantry Brigade. An urgent request for air support proved counter-productive, as it did little damage to the enemy, but took a heavy toll due to friendly fire. The AMX squadron of 20 Lancers put up a gallant fight, avoiding a disaster.

In face of the overwhelming Pakistani attack, the XV Corps headquarters pushed in 6 Rajput, 20 Lancers and 28 Infantry Brigade. 191 Brigade was asked to partially withdraw to Akhnoor during the night of 1 September 1965 and tasked for its defence. On 2 September 1965, 41 Brigade was asked to occupy Jourian-Troti area with support from 20 Lancers, 161 Field Regiment and a battery of 38 Medium Regiment. On 3 September, Pakistani armour mounted a major attack on Jourian. As the Indian defence was unlikely to withstand the attack, 28 Infantry Division was placed under the command of the division and rushed in. During the night of 4 September, 41 Division withdrew to Akhnoor, with the newly raised 161 Field Regiment abandoning its guns.

In Kalidhar, in spite of heavy shelling, 28 Infantry Brigade maintained a good defence and repulsed the attack. Meanwhile, the offence by XI Corps in Lahore and I Corps in Sialkot, forced the Pakistani Army to pull back a major part of armour and artillery along with an infantry brigade from the Chhamb sector. Taking this opportunity, a counter-offensive was planned on the night of 6 September. The offensive though did not make much headway because of intense artillery and tank fire. The plans were revised and subsequent attacks were made on 9 and 10 September. 2 Grenadiers suffered heavy casualties. 41 Mountain Brigade was moved out of the sector to XI Corps zone on 10 September, taking away the Division's striking potential. The battle in the sector shifted north. 6 Sikh Light Infantry captured Point 3776, which gave the Indian troops domination of the Kalidhar ridge. 1/1 Gorkha Rifles captured Point 2357 on 14 September and Manani on 18 September. 3 Kumaon assaulted Gulaba Chappar on 17 September causing heavy enemy casualties, but its attack on Keri NW 7473 was not successful. The Kumaonis, under Major D.N. Singh were able to successfully attack the Pakistani position at Keri, overwhelming it after a fierce hand-to-hand fight, but the intrusion further was successfully halted and a counterattack followed by accurate artillery fire repulsed the Battalion. Despite being a nascent formation, the division had acquitted itself well and was awarded six Maha Vir Chakras and fourteen Vir Chakras during the war.

== Indo-Pakistani War of 1971 ==
ORBAT

- Deccan Horse (9 Horse)
- 51 BSF
- 57 BSF
- 28 Infantry Brigade (Brigadier MV Natu)
  - 5 Rajput
  - 2 Jammu and Kashmir Rifles
  - 7 Jammu and Kashmir Militia
  - 8 Jammu and Kashmir Militia
- 191 Infantry Brigade (Brigadier RK Jasbir Singh)
  - 5 Sikh
  - 5 Assam
  - 10 Garhwal Rifles
  - 4/1 Gorkha Rifles
- 68 Infantry Brigade (Brigadier RT Morlin)
  - 7 Kumaon
  - 9 Jat
  - 5/8 Gorkha Rifles
  - 3/4 Gorkha Rifles
- 52 Infantry Brigade (Brigadier KK Nayyer)
  - 16 Punjab
  - 7 Garhwal Rifles
  - 3/4 Gorkha Rifles (detached to 68 Brigade)
- 3 Independent Armoured Brigade (Brigadier BS Irani)
  - 72 Armoured Regiment
  - 2 Independent Armoured Squadron (from 21 Horse)
  - 8 Light Cavalry (detached)
  - Central Indian Horse (21 Horse) (detached)
  - 7 Grenadiers (detached)
- 10 Artillery Brigade (Brigadier K Srinivasan) and other artillery units
  - 12 Field Regiment
  - 18 Field Regiment
  - 81 Field Regiment
  - 39 Medium Regiment
  - 216 Medium Regiment
  - 86 Light Regiment
  - 127 Divisional Locating Battery
  - 151 Air Defence Regiment (1 troop)
- Engineers
  - 101 Field Company
  - 102 Field Company
War memorials of the Crossed Swords Division
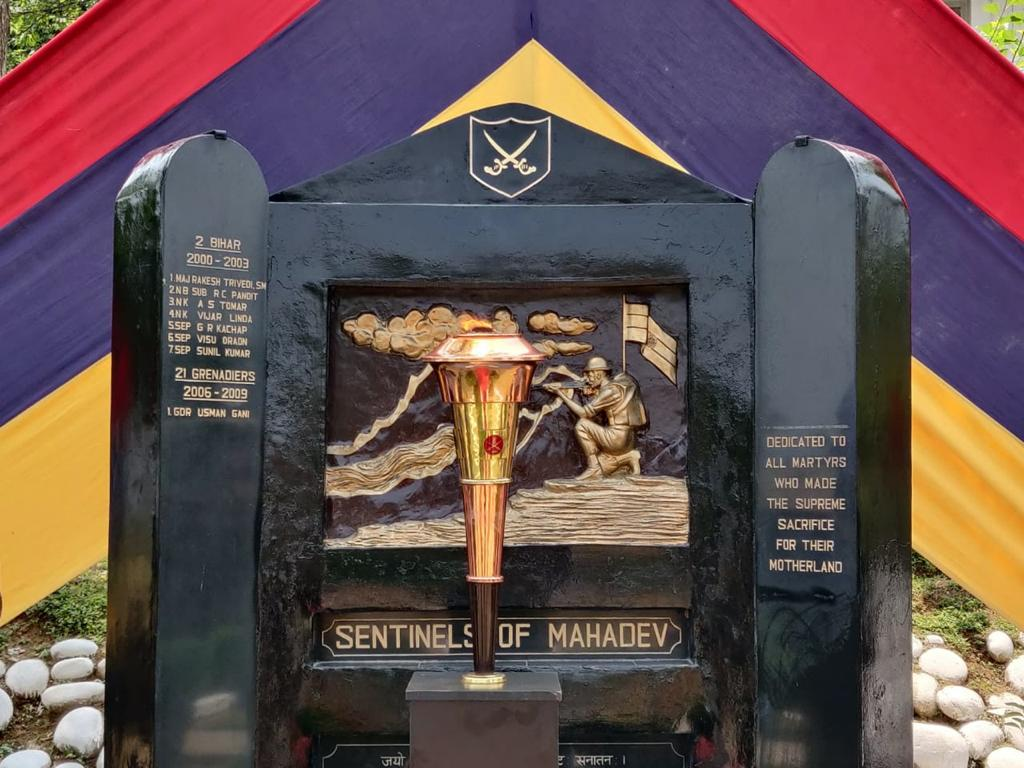
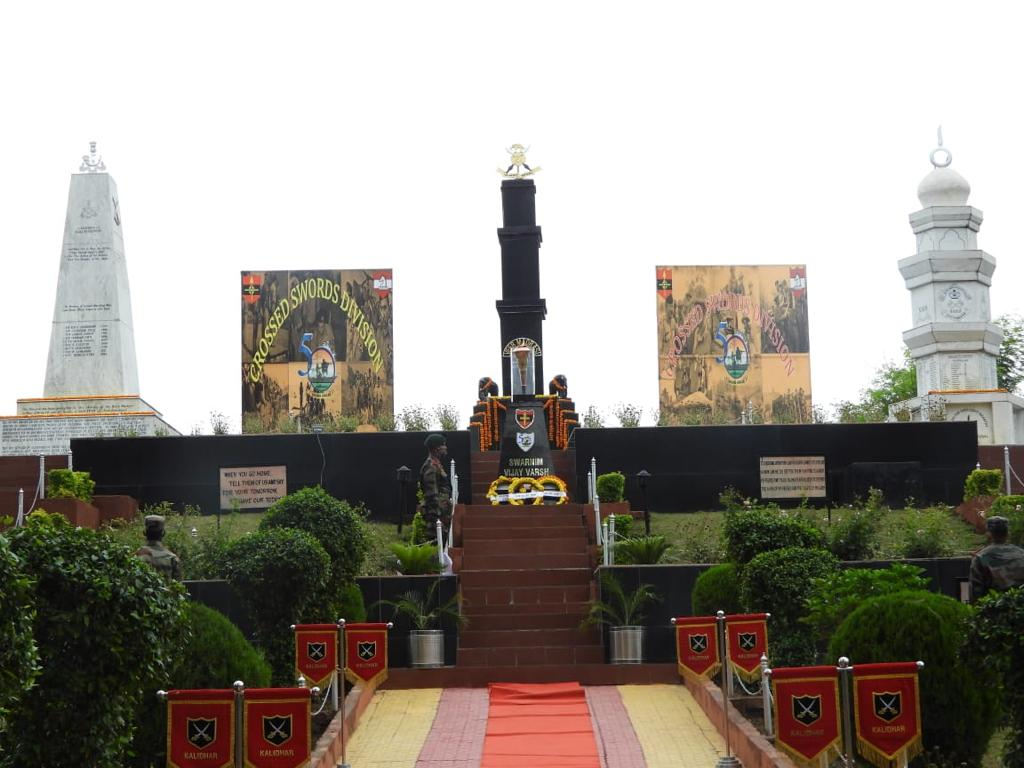
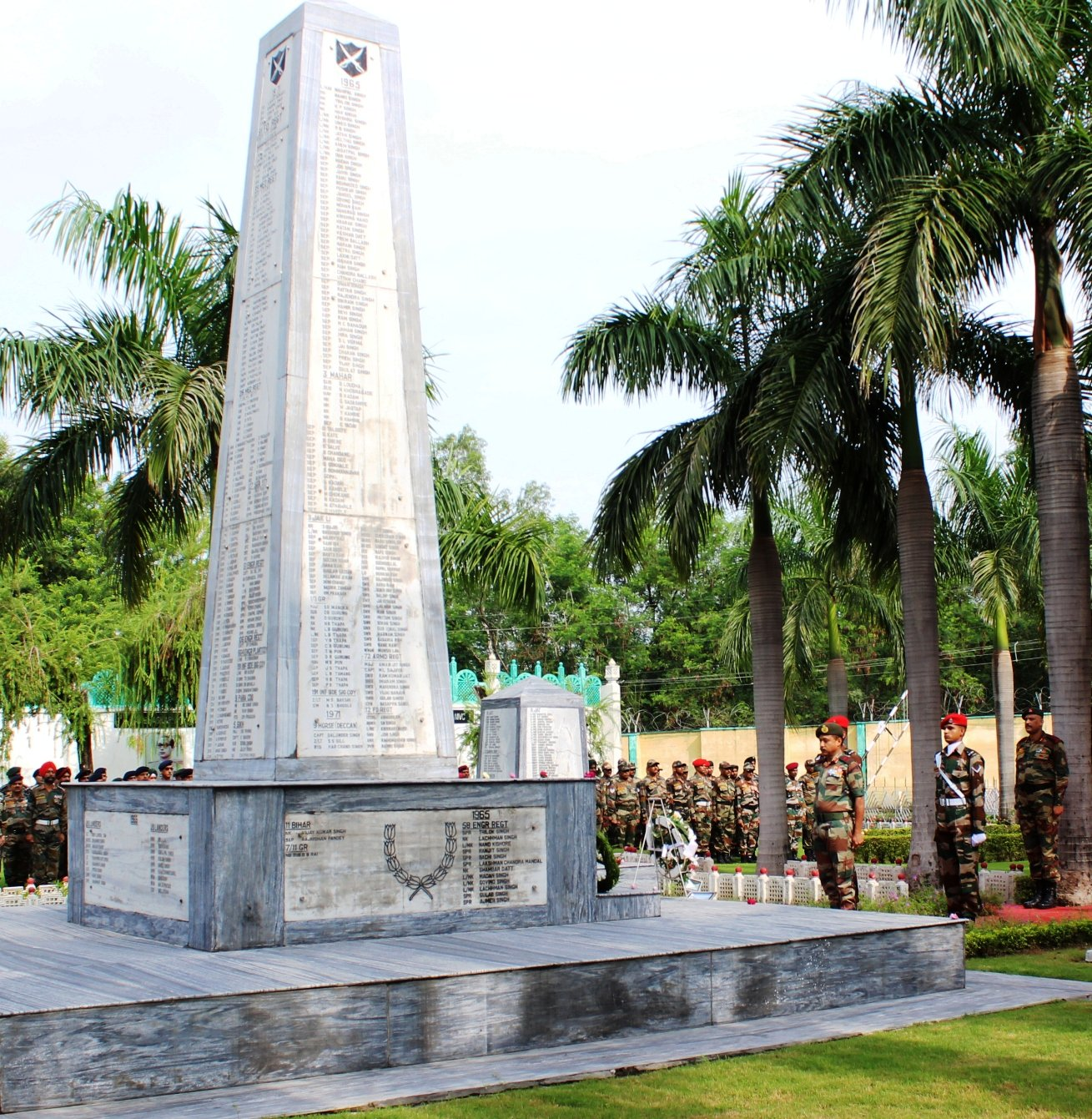

The division was commanded by Major General Jaswant Singh during the 1971 war. In addition to the above units, the division had a para commando group from 9 Para and a company of guided missiles from 12 Guards. The division was tasked to defend the Chhamb-Jourian sector and also attack across the border. In addition to its regular brigades (28, 52 and 191); 68 Infantry Brigade, which was the XV Corps reserve brigade in the Kashmir valley was earmarked as its fourth brigade. 191 Brigade was moved to Chhamb, 68 Brigade was kept as reserve at Akhnoor, while the other infantry brigades and armoured elements were at Kalit-Troti. Anticipating the onset of a Pakistani attack, 52 Brigade was deployed in the area Nawan Harimpur, 28 Brigade on the Kalidhar range and 68 Brigade to the Troti heights. Across the border was the Pakistani 23 Infantry Division commanded by Major General Iftikhar Janjua with its 20, 111, 66, 4 (POK) and 7 (POK) Infantry Brigades and 2 (Independent) Armoured Brigade.

The Pakistani forces with their numerical superiority and geographical advantage went for the offensive. On the night of 3 December 1971, Pakistani artillery started shelling the Indian defences of 191 Infantry Brigade, followed by the infantry and armour attack on 4 December. The latter was blunted by the tanks of Deccan Horse and 5 Sikh with their recoilless guns. The Pakistani forces continued with their attack in the north through Sukhtao Nullah and captured Mandiala North by mid-day of 4 December, a position which they consolidated by the evening of the same day. 6 and 11 POK Brigades managed to cross the Manawar Tawi River, but ran straight into an Indian medium artillery regiment, which inflicted heavy casualties to them. Five Indian guns were damaged. An attempt by Pakistani tanks to cross the river was thwarted by the Indian armour and 5 Pakistani tanks were destroyed. The Pakistanis withdrew across the river. A counter-attack by a Gorkha company led to re-capture of the Mandiala bridge on the morning of 5 December. By the evening, Pakistani forces regrouped and attacked Ghogi, Barsala and Point 951 between Chhamb and Manawar and managed to capture Gurha and Mandiala South in the north. On the night of 6 December, the division decided to withdraw and stabilise the defence line to the eastern bank of the Manawar Tawi river. The retreating forces blew up the Mandiala bridge.

Following the withdrawal, the operations shifted to the area east of the Manawar Tawi river. On 8 and 9 December, the Pakistani forces attempted to force the Raipur crossing, but this attack was beaten back by 10 Garhwal Rifles, leading to 39 Pakistani dead and six taken as prisoners of war. This was followed by multiple unsuccessful probing attacks. An armour attack through Sukhtao nullah opposite Chaprael was also beaten back. On the early hours of 10 December, Pakistani 111 Infantry Brigade along with 4 Punjab, 10 Baloch and 28 Cavalry crossed Darh and established a bridgehead. This advance, though could not progress much, because of Indian infantry fire and the Pakistani tanks getting bogged. A counter-attack by a mixed group of tanks from the Deccan Horse and 72 Armoured Regiment failed for the same reason – soft soil.

The Pakistani commander, General Janjua was killed on 9 December 1971, after his helicopter was shot down. Following this, the Indians attacked the Pakistani bridgehead from two directions on 10 December -two infantry companies and one squadron of 72 Armoured Regiment from the north and one infantry company from the south. The attack and the decision of the new commander to pull back troops led to the Pakistanis pulling back on 10 December. The Pakistanis lost six tanks, whereas the Indians lost five. Following this, the line of control was stabilised at this point. After the ceasefire and as part of the Simla Agreement, India lost the territory west of the Tawi river.

Meanwhile, in the hill sector, Pakistan attacked Picquet 707, Laleali and Dewa on 3 December 1971. These attacks were beaten back, except for the one at Picquet 707, where they managed a foothold. An effective counter-attack managed to force the Pakistanis to withdraw leaving 50 Pakistanis dead. The Pakistani forces attempted further attacks on 6 and 7 December without success. A Pakistani air observation post aircraft was shot down at Laleali. A Pakistani platoon successfully infiltrated in the Batal area on 5 December, but was evicted by a company which had moved in from Nathuan Tibba. On 8 December 1971, Dewa and the surrounding heights were captured by Pakistan after heavy fighting.

== The present ==
The 10 RAPID Division is presently located in Akhnoor, Jammu and Kashmir. It has actively participated in counter-insurgency operations in the sector, Operation Rakshak, Operation Vijay and Operation Parakram. It took part in the rescue and relief operation during Operation Megh Rahat during the September 2014 floods in Jammu and Kashmir.

== Formation Sign ==
Following re-raising, the formation sign of the division was a scarlet diamond on a black background. It was soon replaced by a pair of crossed swords on a black background. The crossed swords also depict the Roman numeral 'X' and the swords symbolise the personal weaponry of the Dogras, who inhabit the areas where the division operates. The division is therefore also called as the Crossed Swords Division.
