= John Nichols (British Army officer) =

British Army officer

Brigadier John Nichols DSO* MC*
- Born: 5 July 1896; Markington, Harrogate, England
- Died: 7 February 1954 (aged 57); Aldershot, Hampshire, England
- Military career
- Allegiance: United Kingdom
- Branch: British Army; British Indian Army
- Service years: 1914–1948
- Rank: Brigadier
- Nickname: "Crasher"
- Service number: 6701
- Units: Lincolnshire Regiment; 21st Punjabis; Border Regiment
- Commands: 114th Infantry Brigade (1945); Special Allied Airborne Reconnaissance Force (1945); 182nd Infantry Brigade (1943–1945); 50th (Northumbrian) Infantry Division (1942–1943); 10th Indian Infantry Division (1942); 151st Infantry Brigade (1942); Habforce (1941); 1st Battalion, Essex Regiment (1940–1942)
- Conflicts: First World War; Waziristan campaign Arab revolt in Palestine; Anglo-Iraqi War; Second World War
- Awards: Distinguished Service Order & Bar; Military Cross & Bar; Mentioned in Despatches (2); Officer of the Legion of Merit (United States); War Cross, 1st Class (Greece)

Brigadier John Sebastian Nichols, DSO & Bar, MC & Bar (5 July 1896 – 7 February 1954) was a British Army officer who fought during both the First World War and the Second World War. During the latter his most notable role was when he commanded the 50th (Northumbrian) Infantry Division during the Second Battle of El Alamein and in the Tunisian campaign from 1942 to 1943.

== Early life and First World War ==
Nichols was born on 5 July 1896 in the town of Markington, Harrogate, West Riding of Yorkshire. His father was the Reverend Sebastian Elijah Nichols, an Anglican clergyman, and his mother was Caroline Isabel Mare.

Nichols was educated at Eton College and, after volunteering for the British Army, shortly after the outbreak of the First World War, he was commissioned as a second lieutenant into the Lincolnshire Regiment (later the Royal Lincolnshire Regiment) in late September 1914. Promoted to lieutenant in early August 1915, and a captain in early June 1916, he served with the 1/5th Battalion, Lincolns, serving as part of the 138th (Lincoln and Leicester) Brigade of the 46th (North Midland) Division, on the Western Front for most of the war, earning the nickname of "Crasher", and being awarded the Military Cross (MC) in 1918, in addition to being twice wounded. The citation for his MC reads:

For conspicuous gallantry and able leadership on 17th October, 1918, when the enemy position south-east of Vaux Andigny was attacked. He led his company under severe fire from Bellevue Ridge on the left flank, and later collected scattered parties of men and reorganised the line until the left flank had been cleared. He was largely responsible for organising a second attack on the village of Andigny les Fermes, which was strongly held. This attack was successful.

== Between the wars ==
Nichols, made an honorary lieutenant in late November 1919, like many others who had joined up initially for the war, chose to remain in the army, which he did during the interwar period. He transferred to the Indian Army reserve of officers and served with the 21st Punjabis as an acting major in the Waziristan campaign, where he was awarded a Bar to his MC for operations with the Waziristan Field Force in 1921. He transferred back to the British Army to the Border Regiment in March 1922. By now a captain, and returning to England, he attended the Staff College, Camberley from 1930 to 1931, serving alongside such students as G. F. Hopkinson, A. H. Hornby, M. C. Dempsey, M. A. James, J. S. Steele, W. H. E. Gott and G. W. Symes.

After graduating from Camberley in December 1931 he served, from November 1932, as a General Staff Officer (GSO) for Physical Training with Aldershot Command, and was promoted to brevet major in early January 1936. In February 1935 he then became a brigade major with the 13th Infantry Brigade, then commanded by Brigadier John Priestman and was sent to Palestine during the Arab revolt there. Relinquishing this position in February 1937, to Major Manley James, one of his fellow students at Camberley, he was promoted to permanent major in August 1937. From 1938 to 1940, he was Chief Instructor of the Senior Officers' School of the British Military Mission to the Egyptian Army, and was promoted to the local rank of lieutenant colonel.

== Second World War ==
During the Second World War, Nichols served with a mixed formation known as Habforce which forced a successful conclusion to the Anglo-Iraqi War. He later commanded the 1st Battalion, Essex Regiment, then serving as part of the 23rd Brigade of Major-General Ronald Scobie's 70th Infantry Division, during Operation Crusader, in November 1941. In late January 1942, shortly before the battalion departed for India, he took command of the 151st Infantry Brigade, part of the 50th (Northumbrian) Infantry Division, and in late June commanded the 10th Indian Infantry Division, whereby he was promoted to the acting rank of major-general.

From July 1942 he succeeded Major General William Ramsden as General Officer Commanding (GOC) of the 50th (Northumbrian) Infantry Division, leading it in the First Battle of El Alamein, the Second Battle of El Alamein in late October and in the Tunisian campaign at the Battle of the Mareth Line in March 1943, where it formed part of Lieutenant General Sir Oliver Leese's XXX Corps. However, he was relieved of his command in mid-April 1943 by General Sir Bernard Montgomery, the British Eighth Army commander, blamed for his division's relatively poor performance during the battle, although the blame was more a faulty plan than it was Nichols's fault. He was succeeded as GOC 50th Division by one of Montgomery's protegees, Major General Sidney Kirkman, an artilleryman who, like Horrocks, had been at the Staff College alongside Nichols in the year below during Nichols's second year and more importantly was one of Montgomery's many protégés. For his services in the Middle East Nichols was twice mentioned in despatches.

He later commanded the 182nd Infantry Brigade, part of Major-General Charles Wainwright's 61st Infantry Division, in the United Kingdom from November 1943, being made a temporary brigadier the following month, and a lieutenant colonel in mid-January 1944 He also commanded the Special Allied Airborne Reconnaissance Force from March to July 1945. In August 1945 he took command of the 114th Infantry Brigade (formerly the 211th Infantry Brigade).

== Postwar ==
He retired from the army as a colonel, although he had attained the rank of acting major general during his military career and most sources state he was a brigadier. He died on 7 February 1954 at Aldershot, Hampshire, at the relatively young age of 57.

Nick Smart writes that the, "rise and fall of 'Crasher' Nichols was due, no doubt, to a variety of factors. But what his wartime trajectory demonstrates was the importance of patronage in making or breaking an officer's career. An 'old desert hand', he had shown himself 'a brave and honourable soldier'. His 'failure' at Mareth may have been due to his own shortcomings, as Montgomery, by this time enraptured by his own 'left hook' success, expressed with such emphatic authority. But the alternative possibility, that too much was demanded of him and his Division and that blame for the failure of the frontal attack lay higher up the chain of command, has scarcely had an airing. Later in the war, Leese, Nichols' corps commander at Mareth, had to, as he put it, 'carry the can for Dickie (Mountbatten)'. The possibility remains that Leese withdrew his patronage from Nichols because, embarrassed by his own failure, he needed someone to carry his can."

== Bibliography ==
- Blaxland, Gregory (1977). The Plain Cook and the Great Showman: The First and Eighth Armies in North Africa. Kimber. ISBN 0-7183-0185-4.
- Callahan, Raymond (2007). Churchill and His Generals. University Press of Kansas, 2007. ISBN 978-070061512-4.
- Converse, Alan (2011). Armies of Empire: The 9th Australian and 50th British Divisions in Battle 1939–1945. Cambridge University Press. ISBN 978-0521194808.
- Smart, Nick (2005). Biographical Dictionary of British Generals of the Second World War. Barnsley, South Yorkshire: Pen and Sword Books. ISBN 1844150496.

Military offices
Preceded by Thomas Rees	GOC 10th Indian Infantry Division; June–July 1942	Succeeded by Alan Blaxland
Preceded by William Ramsden	GOC 50th (Northumbrian) Infantry Division; 1942–1943	Succeeded by Sidney Kirkman
