= 192 Field Regiment (India) =

- Active: 1965 – present
- Country: India
- Allegiance: India
- Branch: Indian Army
- Type: Artillery
- Size: Regiment
- Motto(s): Sarvatra, Izzat-O-Iqbal (Everywhere with Honour and Glory)
- Colors: Red & Navy Blue
- Anniversaries: 1 February – Raising Day

Insignia
- Abbreviation: 192 Fd Regt

192 Field Regiment is part of the Regiment of Artillery of the Indian Army and consists of 1921, 1922 and 1923 field batteries.

== Formation ==
Orders for raising 192 Mountain Composite Regiment (Towed) at Dimapur was issued by Army Head Quarters on 15 December 1964. The Regiment was raised on 1 February 1965 by Lieutenant Colonel Bhupinder Singh at Diphu, Assam. The Regiment was equipped with 3.7 inch howitzers on its raising. Lieutenant GS Atariwala was the first officer to report and arrived at Dimapur in January 1965. Subedar Major Raj Bahadur Singh, the first Subedar Major of the unit arrived in May 1965. The unit first fired its guns at Mohendijua field firing range in Assam. The unit was renamed as 192 Mountain regiment on 15 September 1965.

== Class Composition ==
Initially, the regiment was to be raised as Sikh Regiment, but at formation, it was decided to have a fixed class composition of Dogras, Rajputs and Jats. On 1 May 1999, the regiment was converted to into an All India All Class (AIAC) unit.

== Operations ==
The regiment has taken part in the following operations –

- Indo-Pakistani war of 1971 – In September 1971, the regiment moved to East Pakistan as part of operation Cactus Lilly and carried out intense firing in support of Mukti Bahini near Harbhanjangarh. An officer of the unit was also amongst those who had trained the Mukti Bahini.
- Operation Trident – 1987 in Fazilka sector.
- Operation Rakshak – Counter terrorist operations in Kirni sector Jammu and Kashmir in 1990.
- Operation Vijay – The unit was deployed at Jaurian, Jammu and Kashmir. The unit’s observation post directed accurate fire upon the enemy’s post during an exchange of fire at Pallanwala sector (Akhnoor).
- Operation Meghdoot (Siachen glacier, 2001) - The unit proceeded for its operational deployment at central glacier. During its deployment at the observation post, the team came under heavy enemy fire. Once the firing was over, it came to light that OP officer was missing. Lance Naik Dilbag Singh under heavy enemy fire volunteered and brought back the officer who was lying unconscious at 1800 feet below the post. For this gallant action and saving the life of an officer, Dilbag Singh was awarded the Sena Medal.
- Operation Parakram – After the terrorist attack on Parliament on 13 December 2001, Operation Parakram was launched. The unit was deployed at its operational gun areas in Bala Pindi in Gurdaspur District in Punjab.
- Counter Insurgency operations - The unit has also extensively been part of various counter insurgency operations in Jammu and Kashmir and Punjab during its tenures. These included Operations Sher Kalander and Atank Daman.
- Humanitarian Assistance and Disaster Relief – The unit has actively provided assistance during natural and man-made calamities. This includes the recent 2022 Morbi bridge collapse in Gujarat.
- The unit was entrusted with the responsibility of Indian Army Enclosure for static display of Indian Army equipment as part of Defence Expo 2022 and was responsible for overall coordination for complete static display at Helipad Exhibition Centre at Gandhinagar.

== Gallantry awards ==
The regiment has won the following gallantry awards

- Sena Medal – 2
- Mentioned in dispatches – 1
- Chief of Army Staff Commendation cards – 2
- GOC-in-C Commendation cards – 7

== Motto and War Cry ==
The motto of the regiment is कुछ भी कर सकते है (Kuch Bhi Kar Sakte), which translates to ‘Can Do’. This was bestowed by Major General JFR Jacob, GOC 12 Infantry Division after witnessing the excellent standards of 192 Mountain Gunners during an exercise, which had recently moved out from the jungle terrains of Assam and did well in the deserts of Rajasthan. The war cry of the unit is दुर्गा माता की जय (Durga Mata Ki Jai), which carries its lineage to goddess Durga, the slayer of demons.

== Notable Officers ==
- Lieutenant General Bhupinder Singh – First commanding officer, became GOC-in-C, Central Command from 1983 to 1985.
- Brigadier Saran Prasad – Second Commanding Officer

== See also ==
- List of artillery regiments of Indian Army
