= Wilfrid Lewis Lloyd =

British Indian Army general

Major-General Wilfrid Lewis Lloyd CBE DSO* MC
- Born: 1 March 1896; York, Yorkshire, England
- Died: 22 January 1944 (aged 47)
- Military career
- Allegiance: United Kingdom
- Branch: British Army
- Service years: 1914–1944
- Rank: Major-General
- Service number: 8952
- Units: King's Shropshire Light Infantry; 39th Garhwal Rifles; 19th Hyderabad Regiment
- Commands: 5th Indian Infantry Brigade; 14th Indian Infantry Division; 10th Indian Infantry Division
- Conflicts: World War I World War II
- Awards: Commander of the Order of the British Empire; Distinguished Service Order and bar Military Cross

Major-General Wilfrid Lewis Lloyd, CBE, DSO and Bar, MC (1 March 1896 – 22 January 1944) was an officer in the British Army and the British Indian Army during the First and Second world wars.

== Early life ==
Lloyd was born in York, England, on 1 March 1896, son of Major Ernest Thomas Lloyd (1860-1935), formerly of the Bengal Civil Service, and his wife Ethel Mary (died 1961), second daughter of Sir Richard Dansey Green-Price, 2nd Baronet. Sir Guy Lloyd, 1st Baronet (1890-1987), another future British Army officer and Member of Parliament, was his elder brother.

== First World War ==
Lloyd was commissioned into the 7th (Service) Battalion of the King's Shropshire Light Infantry in September 1914, arrived in France in October 1915, and fought with the regiment until 1917, winning a Military Cross during the Battle of the Somme. The citation for the medal reads:

For conspicuous gallantry during operations. When another regiment needed support, he led up his own company and did fine work consolidating the defences.

In 1917 he transferred to the Indian Army and was attached to 4th / 39th Garwhal Rifles. He was later to join the 19th Hyderabad Regiment.

He remained in the army during the interwar period, attending the Staff College, Camberley from 1927−1928.

== Second World War ==
In July 1940, Brigadier Lloyd was appointed to the 5th Indian Infantry Brigade of the 4th Indian Infantry Division and commanded them in the Western Desert Campaign, the East African Campaign and the Syria-Lebanon campaign. In the Western Desert, Lloyd's forces were involved in the opening stages of Operation Compass. In East Africa, forces under Lloyd's command were involved in the Battle of Agordat and the Battle of Keren. In Syria, he commanded for a period Gentforce. This was a combined British, Indian, and Free French force attacking towards Damascus. He was awarded the DSO on 8 July 1941, followed by a Bar to the award on 28 August. For his services in the latter campaigns he was mentioned in despatches on 30 December 1941.

From October 1941 to March 1943, during the Burma Campaign, Major-General Lloyd commanded the 14th Indian Infantry Division. The Division was defeated during the First Arakan Offensive and Lloyd was removed from command. Most of his contemporaries nevertheless considered he was not responsible for the defeat.

From July 1943, in succession to William Slim, to January 1944 Major-General Lloyd commanded the 10th Indian Infantry Division in Persia and later in the Italian Campaign. He was killed by being struck by a vehicle while monitoring a training exercise in the desert in January 1944, aged 47, and was buried at Heliopolis War Cemetery, Cairo.

== Personal life ==
Lloyd married in 1922 Phyllis Janet, younger daughter of John M.B. Turner, a solicitor, of Bournemouth, England. The couple had two sons and two daughters, one of each survived them:

- Peter John Ernest, born 1923.
- Maureen Joan, born 1927, died 1943.
- David Owen Reginald, born 1931, died 1934.
- Patricia Jane, born 1938.

After his death, his widow remarried, to Francis Arnold Benedict Jones.

== Command history ==
- General Staff Officer, Division - 1939
- CO 5th Indian Infantry Brigade, North Africa - 1940
- CO 5th Indian Infantry Brigade, East Africa - (1940–1941)
- CO 5th Indian Infantry Brigade, North Africa and Syria - 1941
- Director of Military Training, India - (1941–1942)
- GOC 14th Indian Infantry Division - (1941–1943)
- GOC 10th Indian Infantry Division - (1943–1944)

== Bibliography ==
- Smart, Nick (2005). Biographical Dictionary of British Generals of the Second World War. Barnesley: Pen & Sword. ISBN 1844150496.

Military offices
Preceded by New post	GOC 14th Indian Infantry Division; 1942–1943	Succeeded by Cyril Lomax
Preceded by Alan Blaxland	GOC 10th Indian Infantry Division; 1943–1944	Succeeded by Denys Reid
