= 5th Indian Infantry Brigade =

Infantry Brigade of the Indian army during World War II

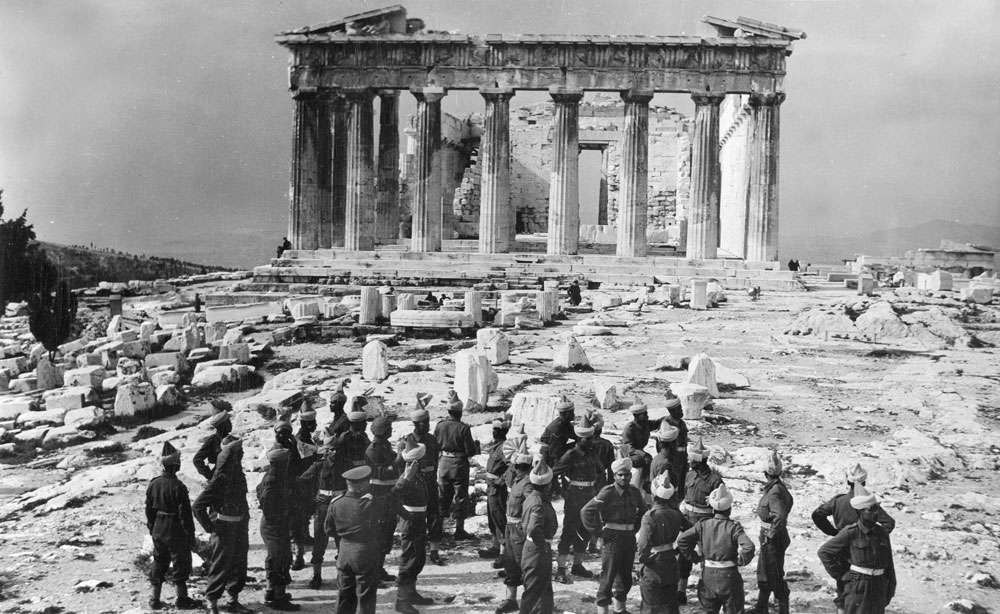
- 5th Indian Infantry Brigade tour the Acropolis, 1944
- Active: 1939–1945
- Country: British India
- Allegiance: British Empire
- Branch: British Indian Army
- Type: Infantry
- Size: Brigade
- Engagements: North African Campaign; East African Campaign; Syria-Lebanon Campaign; Tunisia Campaign; Italian Campaign; Greek Civil War

The 5th Indian Infantry Brigade was an infantry brigade formation of the Indian Army during World War II. It was converted from the 9th Indian Infantry Brigade in September 1939, and assigned to the 4th Indian Infantry Division. The brigade first moved to Egypt and took part in the early battles in North Africa. Then in 1941, it moved to the Sudan with the 5th Indian Infantry Division. Returning to 4th Indian Division command it took part in the Syria-Lebanon Campaign. The brigade then returned to North Africa coming under command of the 5th and 10th Indian Infantry Divisions, and the 50th (Northumbrian) Infantry Division and the 51st (Highland) Infantry Division in the Campaign in Tunisia. The brigade once more returned to the 4th Division for the Italian Campaign and the Greek Civil War.

== Commanders during World War II ==
- Brigadier Theophilus J. Ponting (Sep 1939 - Jun 1940)
- Brigadier Wilfrid Lewis Lloyd (Jun 1940 - Sep 1941)
- Brigadier Dudley Russell (Sep 1941 - Dec 1942)
- Brigadier Donald R.E.R. Bateman (Dec 1942 - Apr 1944)
- Brigadier John C. Saunders-Jacobs (Apr 1944 - 1946)

== Formation ==
- 1st Battalion, Royal Fusiliers September 1939 to August 1941
- 25th Field Regiment, Royal Artillery September 1939 to September 1940
- 3rd Battalion, 1st Punjab Regiment September 1939 to February 1942
- 4th Battalion, 6th Rajputana Rifles September 1939 to July 1943 and February to April 1944
- 4th Battalion, 11th Sikh Regiment January to March 1941 and August to November 1944
- 3rd Battalion, 14th Punjab Regiment February 1941
- 1st Field Regiment, Royal Artillery June to July 1941
- 2/3rd Australian Infantry Battalion June 1941
- 1st Battalion, Essex Regiment August to September 1941
- 1st Battalion, Buffs (Royal East Kent Regiment) October to December 1941
- 1st Battalion, 6th Rajputana Rifles December 1941 to February 1942 and July 1943 to April 1944
- 1st Battalion, Welch Regiment January to April 1942
- 8th Field Regiment, Royal Artillery February 1942
- 3rd Battalion, 10th Baluch Regiment April 1942 to February 1943 and June 1944 to August 1945
- 1/4th Battalion, Essex Regiment April 1942 to August 1944 and November 1944 to August 1945
- 1st Battalion, 9th Gurkha Rifles February 1943 to August 1945
- 1st Battalion, Westminster Regiment January 1944
- 2nd Battalion, 7th Gurkha Rifles August to September 1944 ? 2/7 Gurkha Rifles Gurkha
- 18th Field Company, Indian Engineers May to October 1941

== See also ==
- List of Indian Army Brigades in World War II
