= Iftikhar Khan Janjua =

Pakistan Army major general

Iftikhar Khan Janjua HJ & BAR (Note: "Bar" refers to a second award of the same honor.) SPk SQA
- افتخار خان جنجوعہ
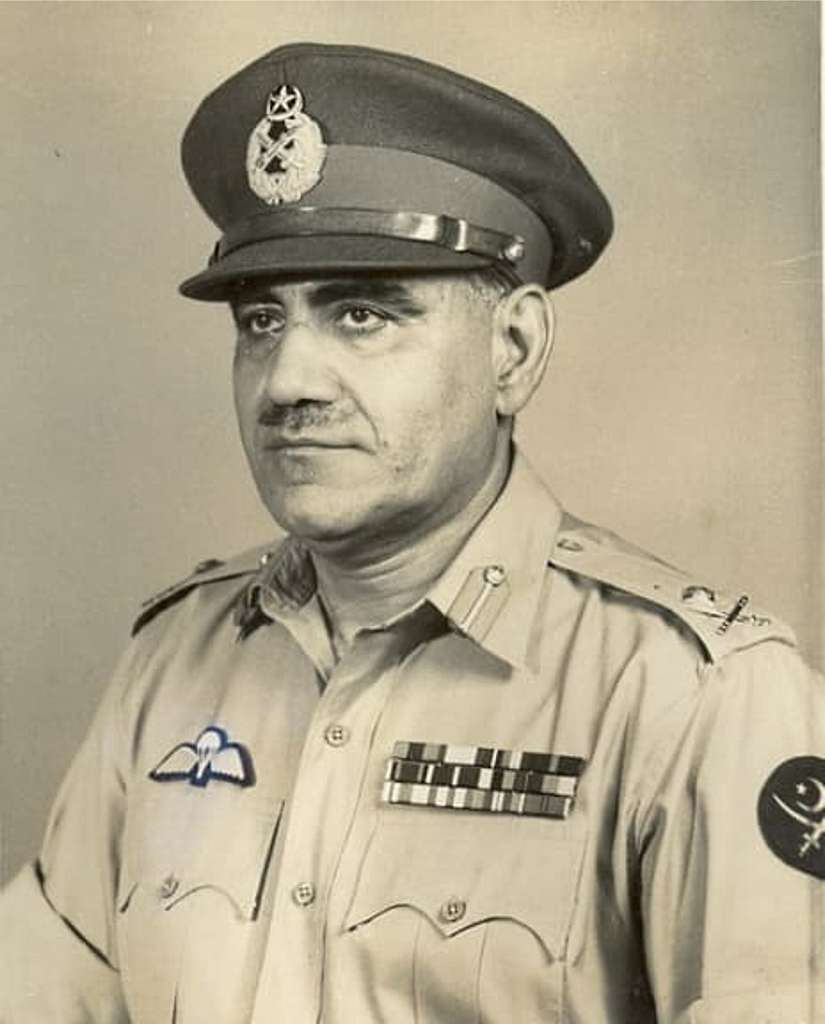
- Iftikhar Janjua as a Major General
- Born: 29 December 1921; British India
- Died: 9 December 1971 (aged 49); Combined Military Hospital, Kharian, Pakistan
- Cause of death: Bell 47 Helicopter crash
- Military career
- Allegiance: British India; Pakistan
- Branch: (British Raj) British Indian Army (1942–1947); Pakistan Army (1947–1971)
- Service years: 1942—1971
- Rank: Major General
- Unit: 10th Baluch Regiment
- Commands: 10th Baloch Regiment; 6th Brigade; 6th Armoured Division; 23rd Division Group
- Conflicts: World War II; Operation Desert Hawk; Indo-Pakistan War of 1965; Operation Grand Slam; Indo-Pakistan War of 1971; Battle of Chumb †
- Awards: Hilal-e-Jurat & BAR; Sitara-e-Pakistan; Sitara-e-Quaid-e-Azam

Iftikhar Khan Janjua (Note: Urdu: افتخار خان جنجوعہ) HJ & BAR SPk SQA (29 December 1921 – 9 December 1971) was one of the most senior Pakistani army officers to have been killed in action. (Note: second to Lt. Gen. Mushtaq Ahmed Baig in 2008) For his role in the 1965 Kutch conflict, he is known as the hero of the Rann of Kutch. He died of wounds he sustained in a helicopter crash in the Battle of Chamb during the Indo-Pakistan War of 1971 while he was leading the 23rd division into Indian territory.

He was the first of only two generals of the Army to have died in combat.

== Military career ==
Iftikhar Khan Janjua was born on 29 December 1921 in British india, Jhelum today in Pakistan. He was a graduate from Staff College Quetta and Leavenworth (USA).

=== British Indian Army ===
He was emergency commissioned into the 10th Baluch Regiment of the British Indian Army on 3 April 1942

During World War II, Janjua saw action in the Mediterranean theatre, serving in North Africa, Italy and Greece.

=== Pakistan Army ===
==== 1965 war with India ====
In April 1965, as part of a tri-service exercise (Arrow Head), Indian brought in 31 and 67 Infantry Brigades in area Karim Shahi - Kavda. The Indian Air Force and the Indian aircraft carrier INS Vikrant, supported by other naval vessels, also moved into the gulf. On 8/9 April, in a series of events not entirely clear, clashes broke out between the Indian forces and the Pakistani forces at a post near Ding, Rann of Kutch. Brigadier Iftikhar Janjua was the commander of the 6th Brigade, on 23 April Janjua ordered the 4 Punjab to capture point 84 by first activity around Chad Bet. Since the progress of 6 Punjab was slow 2 Frontier Force (FF) was directed to join them. By first light, the battalion reached its objective without suffering too many casualties. 2 FF later attacked Biar Bet along with a squadron of 12 Cavalry. Biar Bet was captured by 0600 hours on 26 April.

The outcome of the Rann of Kutch was considered as a positive for the Pakistan Army. As described by Lt General Gul Hassan Khan, then Director of Military Operations, in his later memoirs - "the set back in Kutch proved immeasurably disconcerting to the Indian army. As a result, the Government of India was in a quandary. On the other hand, ours was in a state of euphoria. The high command of our army was intoxicated by our showing and our morale could not possibly have been higher. We were ready for any task that may be assigned to us without any question.". The restraint shown by India would later convince Field Marshal Ayub Khan that the Indian Government was in no mood to fight. This encouraged them into launching the disastrous Kashmir offensive, which led to the War in September 1965 which ended in stalemate. After the 65 War, Janjua was the divisional commander of 6 Armoured Division even though he himself was an infantry officer - no mean feat. He spared himself the time to learn about the nuances of armoured fighting vehicles and their operations. Soon after, Janjua would command 23 Division based at Jhelum.

On 4 September 1965 Brig. Iftikhar with his 6 brigade moved to Operation Grandslam operational area to provide relieve to 102 brigade in defence of Tawi river line.

==== 1971 war with India ====
In the 1971 War, Janjua was divisional commander of 23 Infantry Division. He was assigned the task of capturing Chamb, a strategically important town in Kashmir, which would turn out to be the only decisive victory for Pakistan on the Kashmir front of 1971. The fighting around Chamb was fierce and took toll on both the advancing Pakistani troops and the fiercely resisting Indian regiments. Although Janjua was advised by high command to try to take Chamb from the south, Janjua said it was a better to take Mandiala bridge his troops would outflank the Indians eventually forcing them out of Chamb and all the area west of Tawa.

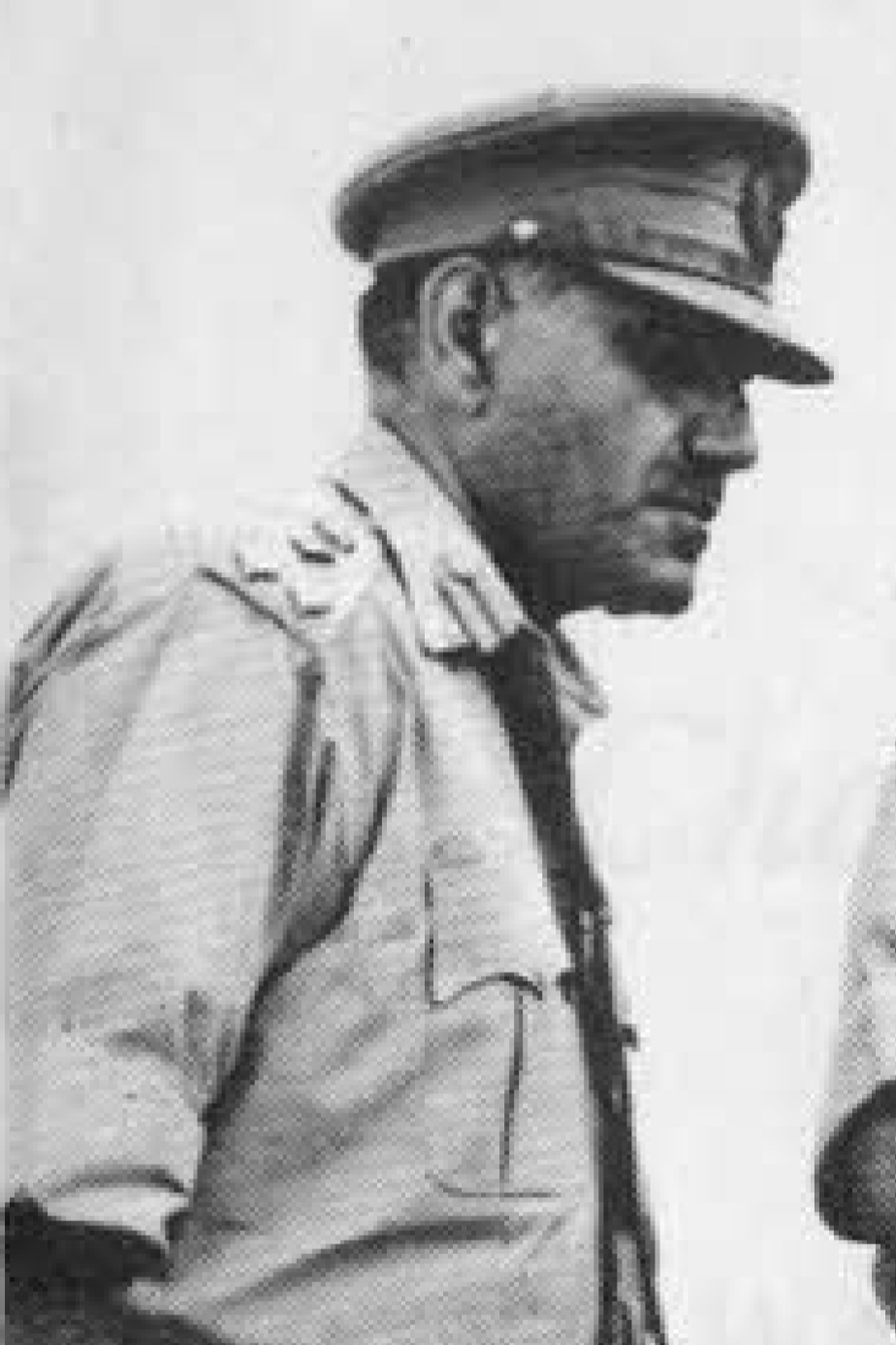
General Iftakhar khan Janjua

After intense fighting Mandiawala was captured, then Pallanwala and Chak Pandit, and on 9 December 1971, the first Pakistani troops entered the surrounding area around Chamb under the personal supervision of Janjua. In the middle of fighting around Chamb proper, on 9 December 1971, Janjua was killed when his OH-13S (Sioux) light helicopter, in which he was travelling on to coordinate and position his troops, was attacked. Khan was subsequently evacuated to the Combined Military Hospital in Kharian, where he succumbed to his injuries.

Iftikhar Khan Janjua Road is named after him in Rawalpindi Cantonment.

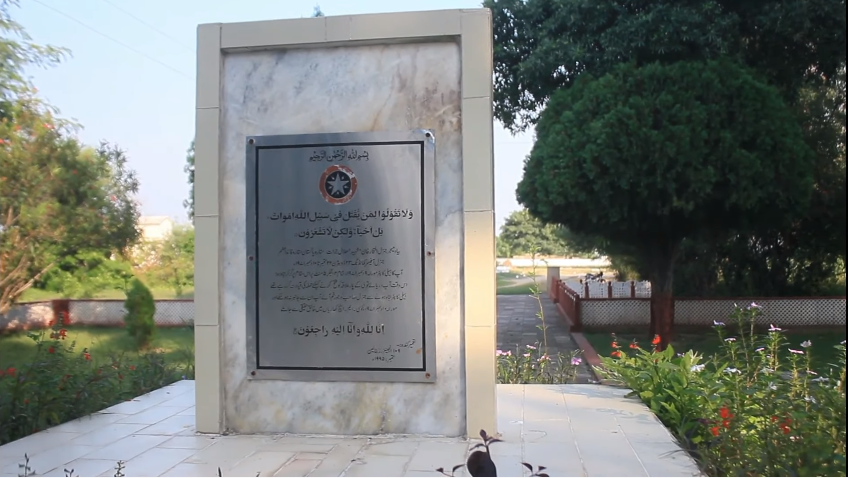
Memorial of Iftikhar Khan Janjua at Chammb

Iftikhar Janjua was a charismatic leader who inspired his troops to continue to fight. He is best remembered for leading from the front by the troops who served in 23 Division during the Battle of Chhamb. This action enabled him to arrive at a realistic appraisal of the actual situation, without reliance on possibly exaggerated reports from lower echelons, which is how he was able to take Chamb.

== Personal life ==
Major General Iftikhar Janjua was born in a Punjabi Janjua Rajput family, and was known for his boldness and for the confidence he inspired among his men by being in the front lines during the heat of the battle. His father Raja Mehmood Amjad was a barrister and the family was settled in Sargodha District. He is brother of Major General Ijaz Amjad the father in law of Qamar Javed Bajwa.

== Awards and decorations ==
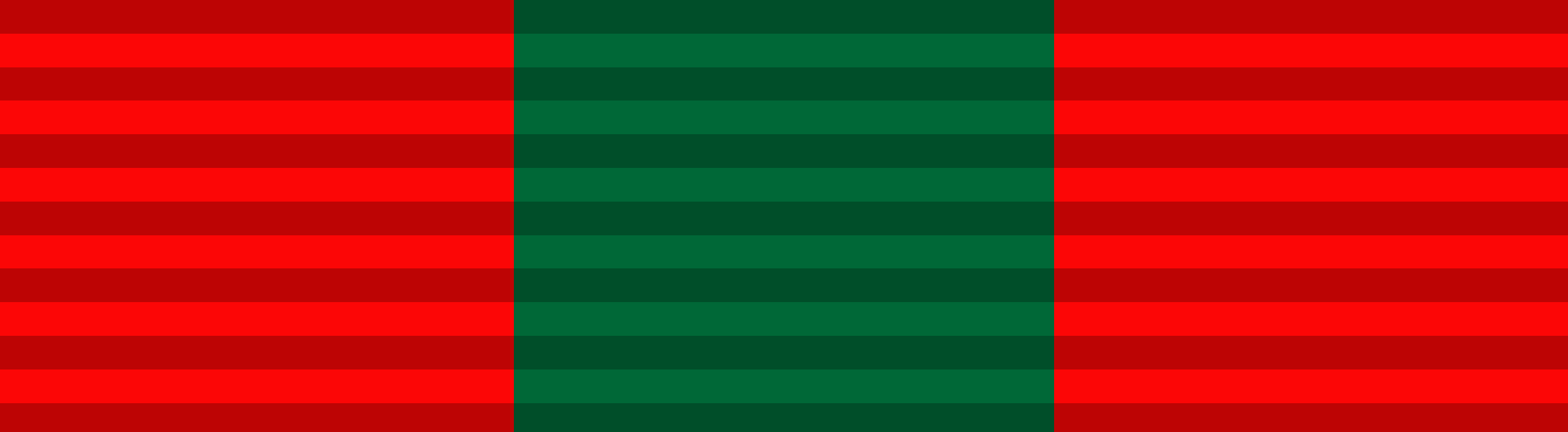

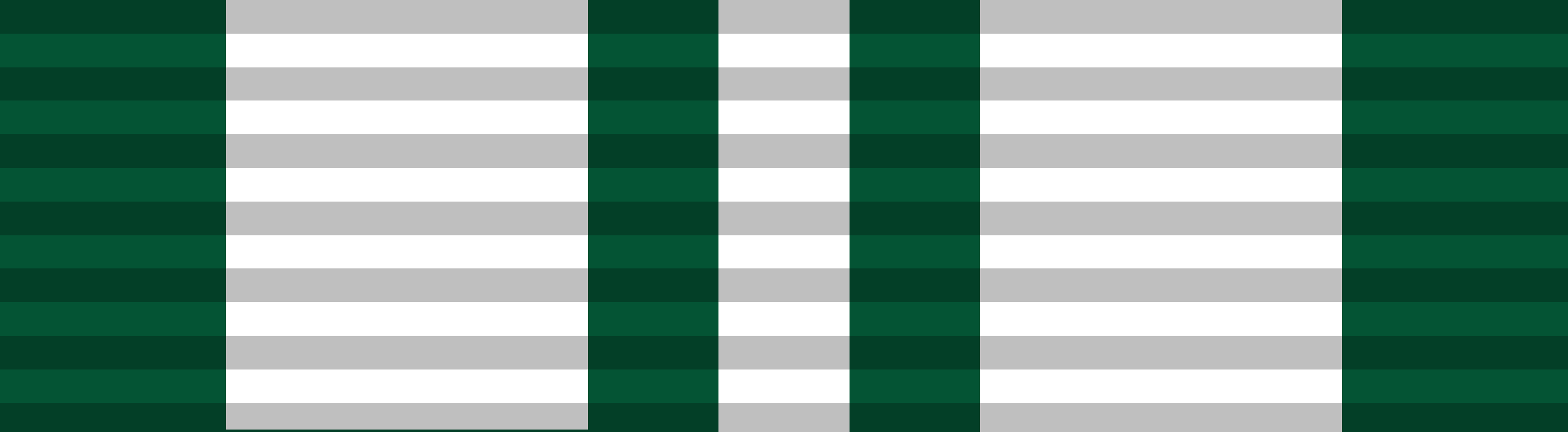

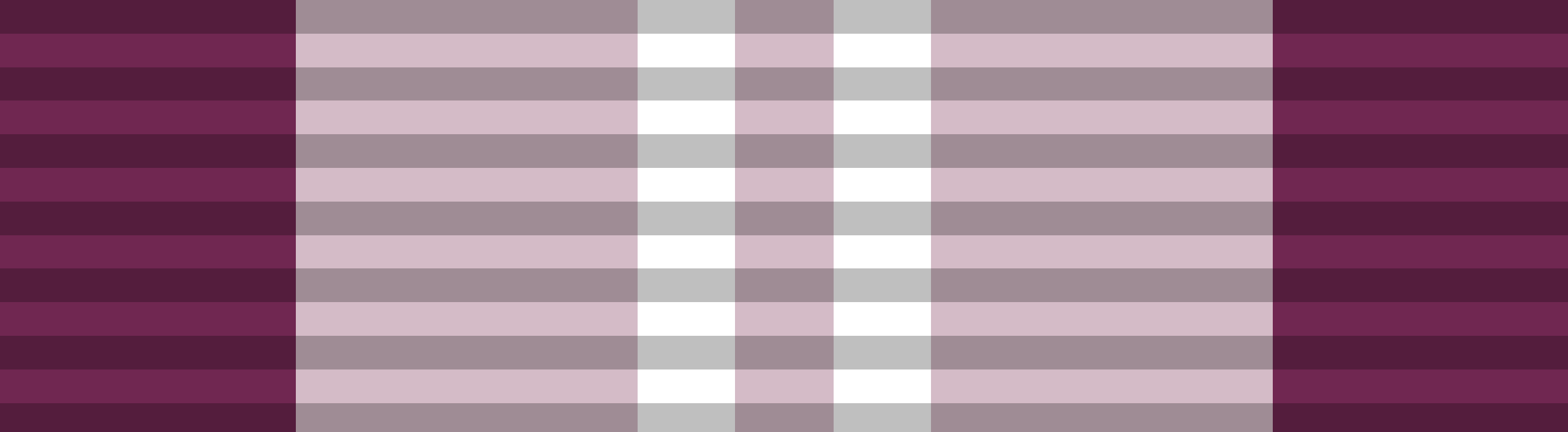

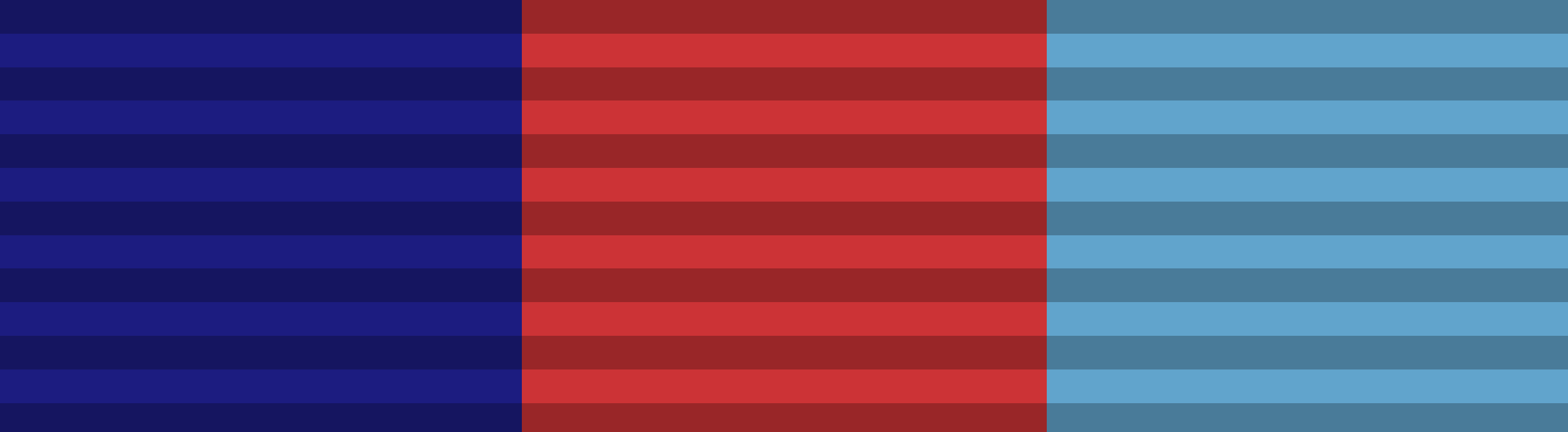

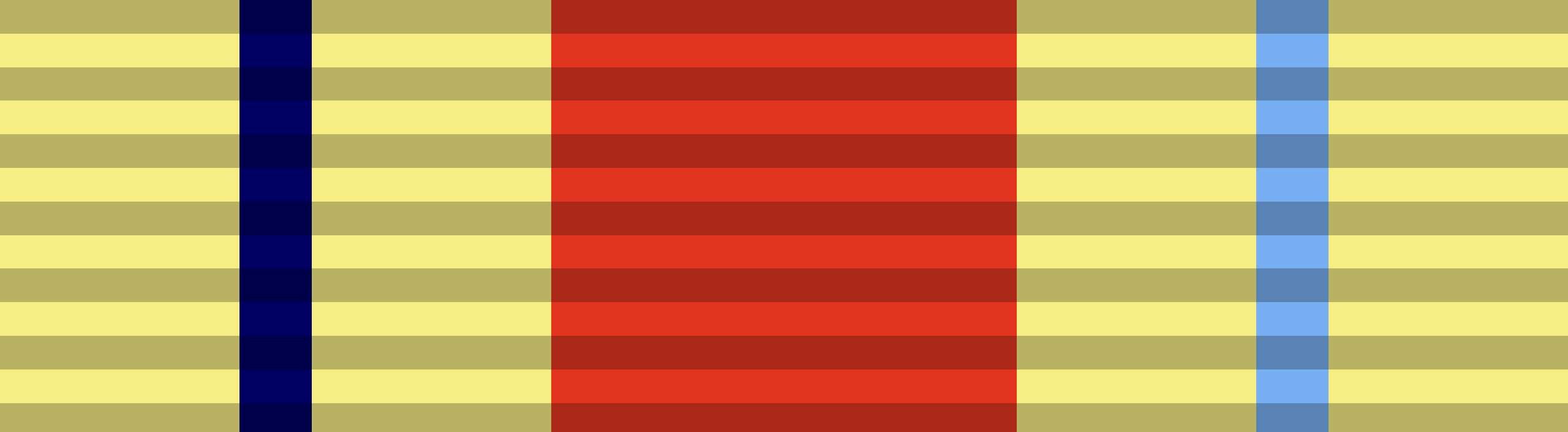

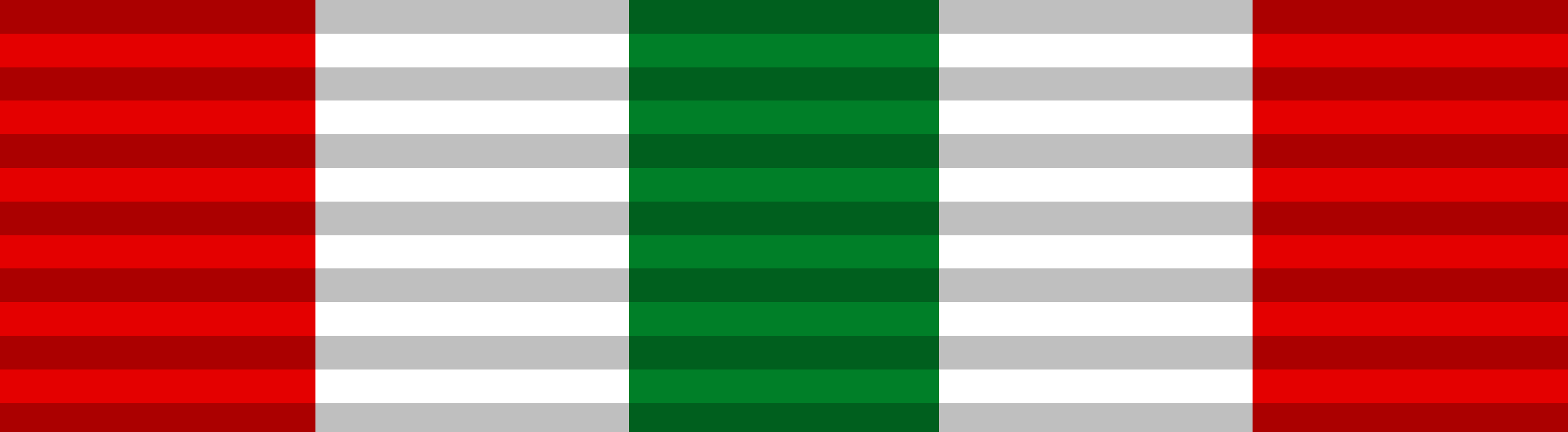

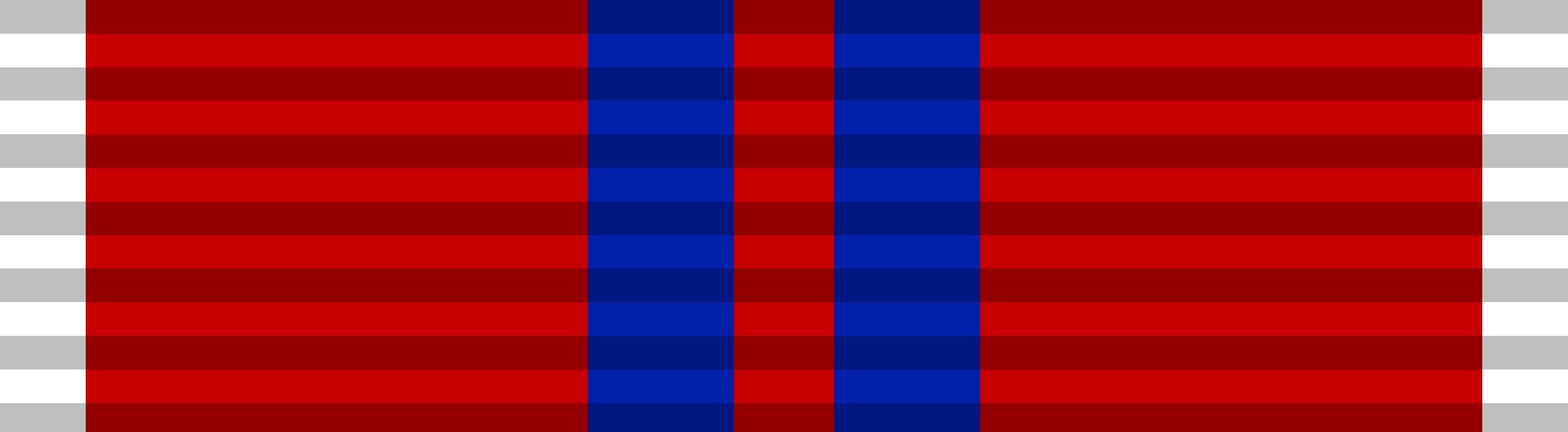

	Hilal-e-Jurat & Bar (Crescent of Courage): 1. 1965 War; 2. 1971 War		
Sitara-e-Pakistan (Star of Pakistan) (SPk)	Sitara-e-Quaid-e-Azam (SQA)	Tamgha-e-Diffa (General Service Medal) 1965 War Clasp	Sitara-e-Harb 1965 War (War Star 1965)
Tamgha-e-Jang 1965 War (War Medal 1965)	Pakistan Tamgha (Pakistan Medal) 1947	Tamgha-e-Jamhuria (Republic Commemoration Medal) 1956	1939-1945 Star
Africa Star	Italy Star	War Medal 1939-1945	Queen Elizabeth II Coronation Medal (1953)

=== Foreign Decorations ===
Foreign Awards
UK	1939-1945 Star
UK	Africa Star
UK	Italy Star
UK	War Medal 1939-1945
UK	Queen Elizabeth II Coronation Medal
