= Alan Bruce Blaxland =

British Indian Army officer

Major-General Alan Blaxland CB OBE
- Blaxland in 1945
- Born: Alan Bruce Blaxland; 17 October 1892; Lilleshall, Shropshire, England
- Died: 2 September 1963 (aged 70); Deal, Kent, England
- Military career
- Allegiance: United Kingdom
- Branch: British Army; British Indian Army
- Service years: 1913–1947
- Rank: Major-General
- Service number: 8681
- Units: Sherwood Foresters; 7th (Duke of Connaught's Own) Rajputs
- Commands: Lahore District (1943–46)} 10th Indian Infantry Division (1942–43); 27th Indian Infantry Brigade (1941–42); 4th Battalion, 7th Rajput Regiment (1938–40)
- Conflicts: First World War; North-West Frontier; Second World War
- Awards: Companion of the Order of the Bath; Officer of the Order of the British Empire; Mentioned in Despatches; Order of the Cloud and Banner with Special Cravat (China)

Major-General Alan Bruce Blaxland, CB, OBE (17 October 1892 – 2 September 1963) was a senior British Indian Army officer during the Second World War.

== Early life and First World War ==
Born on 17 October 1892, he was the second son of the Rev. Bruce Blaxland of Lilleshall. He was educated at Shrewsbury School and went on to St Edmund Hall, Oxford, graduating in 1914.

Blaxland was commissioned onto the Unattached List for the Indian Army on 5 August 1914 (the day after Britain's entry into the First World War), with seniority of 21 January 1913, from being a university candidate. He was attached to the 1st Battalion, Sherwood Foresters in 1914. He later joined the Indian Army.

He was a captain when he married Lilian Ann Lucy in India 19 August 1919.

He was appointed an Officer of the Order of the British Empire (OBE) in the 1926 Birthday Honours while serving with the 1/7th Rajput Regiment of the Indian Army.

== Second World War ==
Remaining in the army between the wars, receiving a promotion to lieutenant colonel on 1 February 1938, he served in the Second World War. As an acting colonel he was an Area Commander in the Sudan from 16 January to 15 March 1941.

He was appointed an acting brigadier on 16 March 1941 when he was appointed a brigade commander, an appointment he held until 21 July 1942. As part of Paiforce (formerly Iraqforce), Blaxland commanded the 27th Indian Infantry Brigade, part of the 6th Indian Infantry Division, during the Anglo-Soviet invasion of Persia. On 22 July 1942, he became General Officer Commanding of the 10th Indian Infantry Division, then serving in the Middle East until 28 August 1942. He was promoted to an acting lieutenant general on 29 August 1942 but reverted to major general in August 1943 for his next appointment in India as District Officer Commanding Lahore District.

After the war he was the chairman of the Indian National Army courts-martial held at the Red Fort at Delhi between November 1945 and May 1946.

In recognition of his services, Blaxland was appointed a Companion of the Order of the Bath in 1945, and awarded the Order of the Cloud and Banner with Special Cravat by China in 1947.

He retired as a colonel and honorary major general on 22 May 1947.

== Bibliography ==
- Smart, Nick (2005). Biographical Dictionary of British Generals of the Second World War. Barnesley: Pen & Sword. ISBN 1844150496.

Military offices
Preceded by John Nichols	GOC 10th Indian Infantry Division; 1942–1943	Succeeded by Wilfrid Lloyd
