= Operation Desert Hawk =

Pakistani military operation in the Rann of Kutch

- Part of the prelude of the Indo-Pakistani War of 1965, Indo-Pakistani wars and conflicts and the Cold War
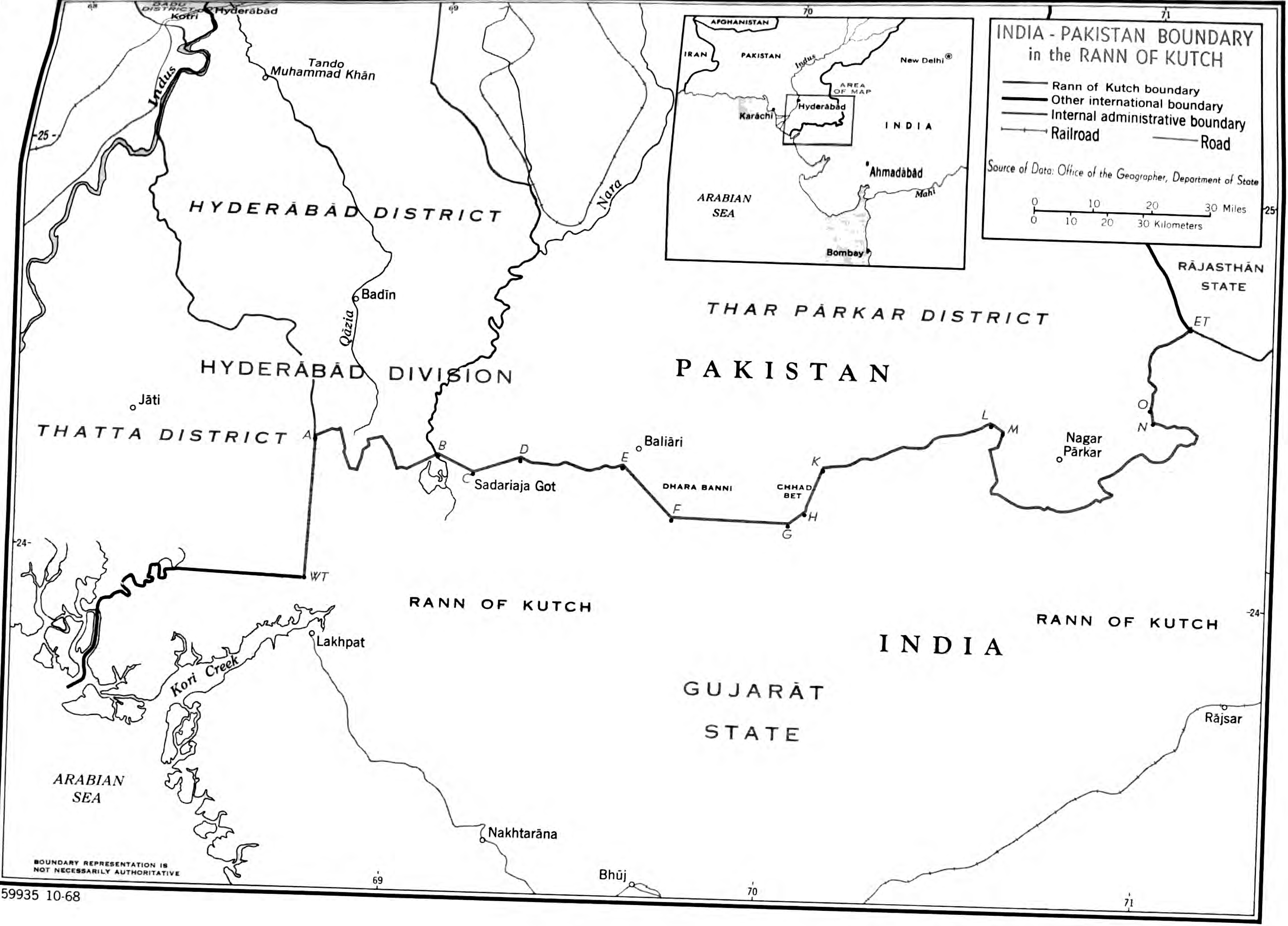
- Map of the India–Pakistan border in the Rann of Kutch
Date	9 April 1965 – 30 June 1965
Location	Rann of Kutch
Result	Ceasefire: Pakistan captured an Indian police post on 9 April, and four more on 24–26 April; Deterioration of India-Pakistan relations

Belligerents
India	Pakistan

Commanders and leaders
Gen. J. N. Chaudhuri	Maj. Gen. Tikka Khan; Brig. Iftikhar Khan Janjua

Operation Desert Hawk was the codename of a military operation planned and executed by the Pakistan Army in the Rann of Kutch area, the disputed area which was under Indian control from the long-standing status quo. The boundary of Rann of Kutch was one of the few un-demarcated boundaries pending since the 1947 partition of India.

== Background ==
The Rann of Kutch (alternately spelled as Kuchchh) is a large area of salt marshes that span the border between India and Pakistan. The area was originally part of the princely state of Kutch, which was acceded to India in present-day Kutch region of Gujarat. Both countries maintained few armed police posts scattered along the border.

== Objectives ==
Pakistan planned to serve several purposes through this operation. First was to assess the response of the Indian government and military, which was relatively unstable under the governance of Prime Minister Lal Bahadur Shastri after the death of India's first Prime minister Jawaharlal Nehru in 1964 and the loss in the 1962 Sino-Indian war. The second objective was to draw Indian armor southward to Kutch, away from the Punjab and Kashmir region. One of the objectives was to test the United States' protest over the use of US-supplied military equipment against the India, which was a violation of Pakistan's commitment. The Pakistan Army also got a rehearsal opportunity for the planned invasion of the disputed territory the Kashmir region administered by India.

== Operation ==
In January 1965, Pakistan claimed the area of Rann of Kutch on the basis of the Sindh province. Pakistan's paramilitary force Indus Rangers started activity and took control over the ruined fort of Kanjarkot located on the north-west fringe of the Rann, Pakistani Indus Rangers started patrolling below the Indian claimed line by January 1965 and occupied an Indian police post near the Kanjarkot fort, which was in violation of the long-standing status quo.

The region's terrain and communication network and logistics was favorable to Pakistan with all the approaches to the Rann of Kutch from the Indian side being more difficult than from Pakistan. The Pakistani railway station situated at Badin was 26 miles north of the Indian claim line and Karachi was 113 miles east from the Badin, where the Pakistan Army's 8 Division was based. Pakistan was able to move the troops quickly and easily along the border line. The nearest Indian railway station at Bhuj was located 110 miles from the border and the nearest Indian Army formation, 31 Infantry Brigade situated at Ahmedabad, was 160 miles east of Bhuj railway station.

In February 1965, bilateral talks for the negotiation failed.

The Pakistan Army, equipped with US-made Patton tanks, struck the Indian forces on 9 April. Pakistan launched a major offensive on the Sardar post comprising a brigade strength.

On 24 April, Pakistan launched "Operation Desert Hawk" a decisive thrust towards the Indian posts in the area deploying an infantry division and two armored regiments equipped with Patton tanks and field guns. The Pakistan Army captured four more posts and claimed the whole Kanjarkot stretch. With poor logistics and inferior military hardware, India had no other option than to retreat after offering decent resistance.

== Battle at Biar Bet ==
In April 1965, tensions heated up in the Rann of Kutch. On April 17, the highly trained but still untested 24th Cavalry received orders to deploy to Chhor, about 800 miles towards Pakistan's southern border, to undertake the Pakistani Army's first-ever tank assault. On April 26, a squadron from the 24th Cavalry joined with the 15 Punjab Regiment and 15 FFR and assaulted the heavily fortified Indian position, a spot known as "Biar Bet." After fierce fighting the Pakistanis prevailed. A United Kingdom mediated peace followed in which Biar Bet was handed back over to the Indians.

== Ceasefire ==
The British Prime Minister Harold Wilson proposed a ceasefire on 28 April. Both countries signed an agreement to settle the disputed border through international arbitration by the International Court of Justice on 30 June 1965. The ceasefire became effective on 1 July 1965. India and Pakistan both agreed to demarcate the border by a three-member arbitration committee. The possibility of the armed conflict escalation was avoided by the active interventions of the British Prime Minister and the United Nations Secretary-General. Both nations withdrew all troops from the disputed and held areas after the peace talks as of 30 June and a pre-conflict status as of January 1965 was established. The dispute later on went for Indo-Pakistan Western Boundary Case Tribunal and was resolved in 1968, in this Pakistan was awarded 301–320 square miles (780–828 km^{2}) of Kutch.

== Aftermath ==
The Pakistan Army decision makers assessed the Indian Army's strength and capability based on the success in the Rann of Kutch area and headed towards their next planned execution of Operation Gibraltar in August 1965 which failed miserably. Despite India's repeated protests against the use of US-made weaponry by Pakistan against India, the President of the United States Lyndon B. Johnson took no effective action against Pakistan. The Indian Navy undertook a brief deployment of the aircraft carrier INS Vikrant to Gujarat as a show of force, prior to the ship going into overhaul the next month.

This attack exposed the inadequacy of the Indian State Armed Police to cope with armed aggression. So after the end of the 1965 war, the government of India formed the Border Security Force as a unified central agency with the specific mandate of guarding India's international boundaries. The Border Security Force came into formal existence on 1 December 1965. Morarji Desai invited around 550 farmers, mostly Sikhs from Punjab, to settle and farm the land for border's safety and security.

== See also ==
- Indo-Pakistan Wars
