= William Archibald Kenneth Fraser =

British Army general (1886–1969)

William Archibald Kenneth Fraser CB CBE DSO* MVO MC
- Born: 19 December 1886; British India
- Died: 9 February 1969 (aged 82); Tunbridge Wells, Kent
- Military career
- Allegiance: United Kingdom
- Branch: British Indian Army
- Service years: 1905–1945
- Rank: Major-General
- Service number: 8268
- Commands: Iraqforce (1941); 10th Indian Infantry Division (1941); Mhow Brigade (1937–40); Jubbulpore Brigade (1937); 12th Cavalry (Frontier Force) (1933–35); South Persia Rifles (1919–20)
- Awards: Companion of the Order of the Bath; Commander of the Order of the British Empire; Distinguished Service Order & Bar; Member of the Royal Victorian Order; Military Cross; Mentioned in Despatches; Croix de guerre (Belgium); Order of Astaur (Afghanistan)

Major-General William Archibald Kenneth Fraser, CB, CBE, DSO & Bar, MVO, MC (19 December 1886 – 9 February 1969) was an officer in the British Indian Army during the First and Second World Wars.

== Military career ==
Born in British India, Fraser was the son of Colonel James Fraser of the Royal Army Medical Corps and Susan Alberta Graves of County Waterford. His father died in 1899 and the family returned to Ireland, where he was educated at [St. Andrew's College, Dublin]. He attended the Royal Military College, Sandhurst and then joined the Indian Army in 1905. He served with the 9th Queen's Royal Lancers and 16th The Queen's Lancers on the Western Front during the First World War, taking part in the Great Retreat in August 1914, the Battle of Neuve Chapelle in March 1915 and the Battle of Arras in April 1917.

Fraser became Commanding Officer of the South Persia Rifles in 1919, Assistant Quartermaster General in 1920, and Inspector General of the South Persia Rifles later that year. He went on to be military attaché in Kabul in 1922, military attaché in Teheran in 1924 and military Secretary to the Governor of Bengal in 1930. He was made Commandant of 12th Cavalry (Frontier Force) and Commander of the Jubbulpore Brigade in 1935, a General Staff Officer Grade 1 at Lahore District in 1936 and Commander of the Mhow Brigade in 1937.

Fraser served in the Second World War and, having been promoted to major general on 26 December 1940 (with seniority from 21 April), he became Commander of the 10th Indian Infantry Division on 15 January 1941.

During the Anglo-Iraqi War in 1941, the ground forces from India that landed in Basra were initially part of an operation codenamed Operation Sabine and, as a result, the force itself was known as Sabine Force. Fraser, commander of the 10th Indian Infantry Division, arrived in Basra on 18 April with his headquarters, one brigade of infantry and a regiment of artillery and assumed command of all ground forces in the Kingdom of Iraq. The name Iraqforce replaced Sabine Force and, as force levels built up, Fraser was succeeded as commander of Iraqforce on 8 May by a more senior commander, Lieutenant General Edward Quinan. On 16 May, having fallen sick, Fraser was replaced as commander of the 10th Indian Infantry Division by Major General William Slim. Fraser retired on 1 June 1941.

Fraser was then re-employed by the British Army in the rank of colonel from 18 December 1941 until November 1945 as the military attaché in Teheran; he was restored to the rank of major general on retiring once again.

== Honours and decorations ==
- Companion of the Order of the Bath – 1 January 1941
- Commander of the Order of the British Empire – 29 September 1922 – for valuable services rendered in connection with minor military operations undertaken by the South Persia Rifles, to be dated 1 September 1922
- Distinguished Service Order – 12 September 1919 to date from 3 June 1919 for "distinguished services rendered in connection with military operations on the North West Frontier, India, in Persia and Trans-Caspasia" & Bar – 17 June 1921 for "distinguished services rendered in connection with minor military operations within the Indian Empire or territories adjacent thereto"
- Member of the Royal Victorian Order – 20 March 1928, for the visit of the King of Afghanistan
- Military Cross – 14 January 1916 to date from 1 January 1916 – New Years honours
- Mentioned in despatches – 1 January 1916
- Croix de guerre (Belgium) – 14 May 1948
- Order of Astaur and sash (Afghanistan) – 1928

== Personal life ==
Fraser married in 1920 Cicely Annie Bill, widow of John Hugo Hepburn Bill of the Indian Civil Service (they had married in 1911 and he was killed by Kurds on 3 November 1919 while lieutenant colonel and Political Officer, Mosul, late resident at Bushire), daughter of Major Robert W. Bill and had one daughter, born 27 November 1923.

== External references ==
- Ammentorp, Steen. "Generals of World War II".
- "Orders of Battle.com". Archived from the original on 17 July 2007.
- Portrait and Biography
