= Karim Shahi =

- Type: Settlement
- Location: Rapar Taluka, Kutch district, Gujarat, India
- Region: Great Rann of Kutch

Karim Shahi is an archeological site in the western Great Rann of Kutch, located near Bela Island in the Rapar Taluka of Kutch district, Gujarat, India.

Situated to the south of the Thar Desert, the dating of pottery and charcoal remains found from the region using optically stimulated luminescence and radiocarbon methods revealed an active human settlement, which flourished from early Iron Age (between 1200 B.C. and 600 B.C) to early historic period (600 B.C. to 400 B.C.).
