= Denys Whitehorn Reid =

Officer in the British Army and the British Indian Army during World Wars I and II

Major-General Denys Whitehorn Reid CB CBE DSO* MC*
- Born: 24 March 1897; Dundee, Scotland
- Died: 28 November 1970 (aged 73)
- Military career
- Allegiance: United Kingdom
- Branch: British Army; British Indian Army
- Service years: 1914–1947
- Rank: Major-General
- Service number: 11495
- Units: Seaforth Highlanders; 5th Mahratta Light Infantry
- Commands: 3rd Battalion, 5th Mahratta Light Infantry (1940–1941); 29th Indian Infantry Brigade (1941–1942); 10th Indian Infantry Division (1944–1947)
- Conflicts: World War I World War II
- Awards: CB (5 July 1945); CBE (9 September 1942); DSO (26 July 1918, 23 March 1941); MC (19 January 1916, 23 March 1918); Legion of Merit, Degree of Commander (USA) (19 November 1948)

Major-General Denys Whitehorn Reid, CB, CBE, DSO & Bar, MC & Bar (24 March 1897 – 28 November 1970) was an officer in the British Army and the British Indian Army during World War I and World War II.

== Early life and First World War ==
He was born in Dundee on 24 March 1897. His father was the Rev John Reid, minister of Ness Bank Church in Inverness, and his mother was Clara Whitehorn, from London.

Reid joined the London Scottish in October 1914, and was commissioned into the Seaforth Highlanders in Jan 1915. He volunteered for early active service as a Trench Mortar officer, winning his first Military Cross at Ploegsteert Wood on 19 Jan 1916. The citation for this award reads:

Temporary Second Lieutenant Dennis Whitehorn Reid, 10th Battalion, Seaforth Highlanders (Ross-shire Buffs, The Duke of Albany's), attached 30th Trench Mortar Battery.
For conspicuous gallantry when commanding his battery in an exposed position for four hours under very heavy fire. When one of his gun detachments was disabled, he worked the gun himself and successfully cut the enemy's wire.

He took part in the Somme offensive and was wounded at Thiepval on 7 July 1916. He rejoined the 7 Seaforth Highlanders as C Coy commander, seeing further action at Arras and Passchendaele, where he was wounded again on 12 Oct 1917. On 23 March 1918 he was awarded a bar to the Military Cross for a rearguard action across the Canal du Nord at Manancourt. The citation for this award reads:

T./Capt. Dennis Whitehorn Reid, M.C., Sea. Highrs.
For conspicuous gallantry and devotion to duty in action. When ordered to cover the withdrawal he handled his company with the greatest skill and brought it back across a canal bridge in good order, in spite of a very heavy machine-gun fire.

Three weeks later he was awarded the Distinguished Service Order for a strenuous attack at Wytschaete. The citation in the London Gazette reads:

T./Capt. Dennis Whitehorn Reid, M.C., Sea. Highrs.
For conspicuous gallantry and devotion to duty. He led his company with great dash in the face of machine-gun fire, and on entering, the outskirts of a village captured singlehanded fourteen enemy, and assisted in the taking of five machine guns. On the following day he consolidated and held a position with a mixed body of troops, short of officers and N.C.O.'s. He always set an example of coolness and courage and was to the fore in all the actions in which his battalion took part.

== Between the wars ==
As the war came to an end, an uncle, unbeknown to Reid, had sent in his name to the India Office in response to an appeal for officers to join the British Indian Army. In August 1918 Reid took a probationary drop in rank from captain to lieutenant to make the transfer. He served as company commander with the 2/103rd Mahratta Light Infantry at Belgaum from September 1918 until November 1920. He was promoted to captain in 1920 and posted to 1/103rd Mahratta Light Infantry as company commander, based at Lahore until April 1922. When the first five Indian Territorial Battalions were created as part of a major re-organisation of the Indian Army, he was posted to Bombay as the Adjutant of the newly created 11/4 Bombay Grenadiers from 1922 to 1925. After long leave in Britain he returned as regimental duty company commander of the 1/5th Mahratta Light Infantry from 1926 with detachments to the Andaman Islands (1926–1928), Santa Cruz and Mandalay. In November 1930 he was involved in a train crash but escaped with minor bruising and returned to Calcutta for ceremonial duties, In April 1933 he led B Company 1/5th Mahratta Light Infantry on a detachment into Tibet as military escort to the incumbent British trade agent at Yatung and Gyanste providing ceremonial escort for the formal visit of F W Williamson, British political officer in Sikkim. On 4 January 1934 he was promoted major and completed a tour of duty in Peshawar and the North West Frontier with the 1/5th Mahrattas at Landikotal, the highest point of the Khyber Pass, in the summer months and Shagai Fort, near Ali Masjid in the winter. During this time he also served as secretary to the Peshawar Vale Hunt. After a further long leave, he was posted to the 3rd battalion 5th Mahratta Light Infantry in April 1938 as second in command, and worked at the Indian Army HQ, Simla, on mobilisation plans.

== World War II ==
At the outbreak of war Reid, who had until then been contemplating imminent retirement, was based at Secunderabad. His services were retained and in June 1940 he embarked with the 3/5th Mahratta Light Infantry for the East African campaign. In November 1940 he was made acting lieutenant-colonel and given command of the battalion which he led in the East African Campaign as part of Indian 5th Infantry Division's 9th Infantry Brigade. Of particular note was the battalion's capture of the Pinnacle on the night of 15 March 1941 during the Battle of Keren. Compton Mackenzie in his book Eastern Epic, the authorised history of the Indian Army from the start of the war until the battle of Alamein, described it as:

...one of the outstanding small actions of the Second World War...Next morning [Frank] Messervy [commander of 9th Brigade] scrambled up Pinnacle to congratulate Reid and his Mahrattas and wondered how they had been able to scramble up with their equipment against fierce opposition, when he was finding it a pretty tough job without [either]...At the top, when he saw the victors, he was overcome by the splendour of their feat and his combative amber eyes filled with tears.

For his part in this action Reid was awarded a bar to his Distinguished Service Order. The citation reads:

During the Keren operations, from the 15 to 26 March 1941, Lieut-Colonel Reid’s battalion, the 5th Mahratta Light Infantry, carried out two highly successful attacks on which, to a considerable extent, was dependent the completeness of the victory won. The first attack was on the feature known as the "Pinnacle", a precipitous strongly held hill which formed the outer bastion of the Brigade’s objective, Fort Dologorodoc. In spite of the immense natural strength of the enemy’s position, which was also wired and carefully prepared for defence, the Mahrattas stormed the hill with remarkable dash and determination.

Again on 22 March, the Mahrattas were given the task of taking the features known as "Hillock B"., and "East Gate", so as to secure the necessary ground east of the main road, to enable the road-block to be repaired, and open the way for our further advance. The attack was carried through successfully in spite of heavy enemy opposition. During this period the Battalion lost all the British officers who had gone into action with it on 15 March, and Lieut-Colonel Reid himself was wounded in the arm by a large shell splinter on 23 March. He, however, refused to be evacuated till after the second attack, in spite of being in considerable pain. Eleven out of nineteen N.C.O’s also became casualties during those twelve days.

The magnificent offensive spirit and the invincible drive shown by this Battalion was, to a large extent, due to Lieut-Colonel Reid’s personal influence and example. With unshaken coolness and indomitable will, whatever the difficulties to be faced, he was always an inspiration to his officers and men.

His rank of Lieutenant-Colonel was made substantive (permanent) in May 1941.

On 5 June Indian Division moved first to Egypt and then Iraq. On 23 October Brigadier Reid was given command of 5th Indian Division's 29th Indian Brigade which had been detached from the division two months previously to form the independent Oasis Group which was holding the Siwa and Jarabub oases which lay on each side of the Egyptian border with Libya some 150 miles (240 km) inland from the Mediterranean Sea. In support of Operation Crusader he formed 'E Force', a mixed arms force composed of a battalion of infantry and engineers from his brigade and a South African armoured car regiment and reconnaissance battalion supported by South African and British artillery detachments. Setting off from Jarubab on 18 November he attacked the deep desert oasis of Jialo on 24 November, capturing it after an all-day battle. The oasis then served as a forward operating base for David Stirling's nascent SAS. For this action he was awarded the CBE. The citation reads:

At the outset of the campaign, Brigadier Reid was responsible for the capture of Jialo. This entailed a difficult and arduous cross-country march, followed by an equally difficult and hazardous attack, the success of which was of extreme importance to the general plan. Throughout all these operations Brigadier Reid’s qualities, as a Brigade commander in war, of the highest class, were clearly demonstrated by the confidence he inspired in those whom he commanded, and by the results he achieved. Due to his unswerving determination, inspiring leadership and military efficiency, Jialo was captured with very small loss. Subsequently his Command advanced into Cyrenacia and took an important part in the operations.

In February 1942 he took command briefly at Tobruk for one month before moving to El Adem during the Battle of Gazala. On 28 June 1942 he was captured when his brigade was overrun in a rearguard action at the Fuka Pass during the withdrawal to Alamein. He spent sixteen months as a prisoner of war in Sulmona POW camp PG78, Italy eventually escaping with two other Brigadiers through the British 8th Army lines at Cassino on 9 November 1943.

In February 1944 he was given command of the 10th Indian Division during the Italian Campaign, for the assault on the Gothic Line and during the 1945 spring offensive. Major-General Reid received the CB in 1945 and the United States Commander, Legion of Merit in 1948 for his services as divisional commander in this campaign. The citation for this latter award reads:

The White House, Washington 17 August 1945.
Citation of Legion of Merit; Degree of Commander
Major-General DW Reid, CBE, DSO, MC., British Army, performed outstanding services as Commander of the 10th Indian Division from 1 April 1944 to 2 May 1945. At the start of the Spring Offensive in Italy, his Division held the key position on the extreme left flank of the British Eighth Army and on the right flank of the United States Fifth Army. The security of these flanks had to be assured for the success of the offensive. This was accomplished in a signally skilful manner by General Reid, enabling other units to push swiftly forward. The 10th Indian Division went on to play a decisive role in crossing the Sillard and Idice Rivers against some of the most expert German troops, keeping pace with the tremendous rate of advance of the 15th Army Group in the Po valley. In subsequent operations south of the Po valley it again distinguished itself in a containing role. The 10th Indian Division's accomplishments in both holding and offensive assignements, and its ability to change quickly from one to the other, were the direct result of General Reid's expert planning, tactical knowledge, and splendid manoeuvring of the troops under his command.

He retired from the army on 12 July 1947 and lived in Somerset.

== Bibliography ==
- Brett-James, Antony (1951). Ball of fire - The Fifth Indian Division in the Second World War. Gale & Polden. Archived from the original on 27 March 2020.
- Hingston, W.G. (1946). The Tiger Triumphs: The Story of Three Great Divisions in Italy. HMSO for the Government of India. OCLC 29051302.
- Mackenzie, Compton (1951). Eastern Epic. London: Chatto & Windus. OCLC 1412578.
- Mead, Richard (2007). Churchill's Lions: A biographical guide to the key British generals of World War II. Stroud (UK): Spellmount. ISBN 978-1-86227-431-0.
- Smart, Nick (2005). Biographical Dictionary of British Generals of the Second World War. Barnesley: Pen & Sword. ISBN 1844150496.
