= Operation Grand Slam =

Pakistani military operation in the 1965 Indo-Pakistani War

- Part of the 1965 Indo-Pakistani war
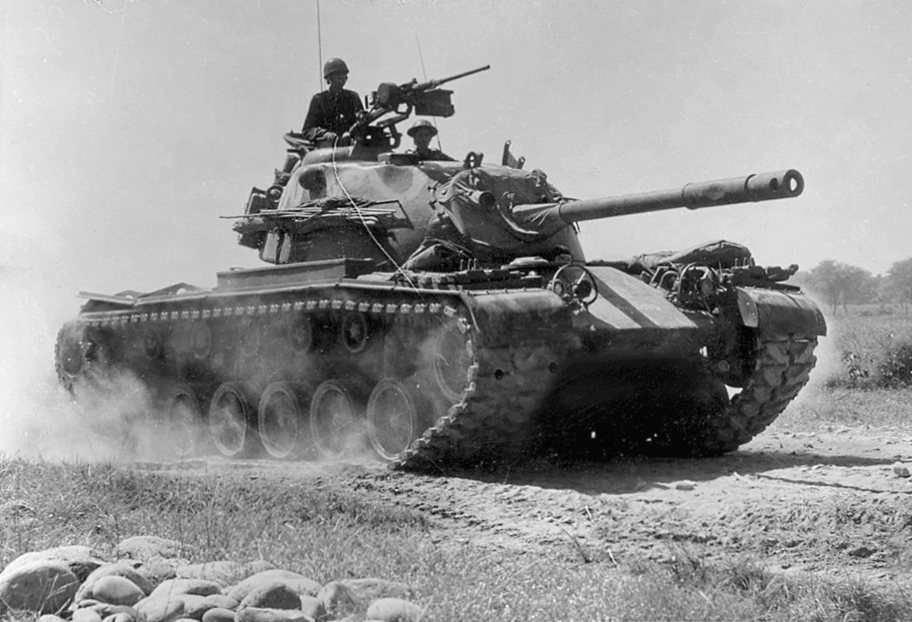
- Pakistani M48 Patton advancing during Operation Grand Slam.
Date	1 September – 6 September 1965 (5 days)
Location	Chumb−Jourian−Akhnoor sector, Jammu and Kashmir (Note: Chamb is now located in Pakistani-administered Azad Jammu and Kashmir following Pakistan's seizure of the town in the Battle of Chamb in 1971; Jourian and Akhnoor remain under Indian control.) 32.87°N 74.73°E
Result	Aborted: Rapid progress made by Pakistan initially; Operation aborted after Indian invasion of Lahore
Territorial changes	Pakistan captures 190 square miles (492 square kilometers) of territory

Belligerents
Pakistan	India

Commanders and leaders
(Pakistan) Maj. Gen. Akhtar Hussain Malik (removed after 2 days); (Pakistan) Maj. Gen. Yahya Khan	Unknown

Units involved
Pakistan Armed Forces; Pakistan Army; 7th Division; 10 Brigade; 13 Lancers; 102 Brigade; 11 Cavalry; 1 Army Aviation Sqn; Pakistan Air Force; PAF Station Sargodha	Indian Armed Forces; Indian Army; 10th Division; 191 Infantry Brigade; 6 Sikh Light Infantry; 15 Kumaon; 3 Mahar; 3 Jammu and Kashmir Militia; 3 Punjab Armed Police; 6/5 Gorkha Rifles; 9 Punjab; 14 Field Regiment; 1 troop Medium Battery; 6 Rajput; 20 Lancers; Indian Air Force; Pathankot Airbase

Casualties and losses
104 KIA	246 KIA; 240 MIA
- Unknown
- Location of Akhnoor within Jammu and Kashmir (present-day borders)

Operation Grand Slam was a key military operation of the Indo-Pakistani War of 1965. It refers to a plan drawn up by the Pakistan Army in May 1965, that consisted of an attack on the vital Akhnoor Bridge in Jammu and Kashmir, India. The bridge was not only the lifeline of an entire infantry division of the Indian Army, but could also be used to threaten the city of Jammu, an important logistical point for Indian forces. The operation saw initial success, but was aborted when the Indian Army opened a new front in the Pakistani province of Punjab in order to relieve pressure in Kashmir. This forced Pakistan to abandon Grand Slam and fight in Punjab, so that the operation ended in failure and stated objectives were not achieved.

== Planning ==
Chhamb-Jourian-Akhnoor sector shown on a contemporary map. (The cease-fire line in effect in 1965 ran roughly along the Dawara stream to the west of Moel.)

The Operation Grand Slam was designed as a twin of the Operation Gibraltar, both of which were meant to jeopardise India's control of Kashmir and bring it to the negotiating table without risking a general war across the international border. The idea for Grand Slam came from President Ayub Khan. When he reviewed the plans for Gibraltar in May 1965, he pointed to Akhnur on the map and called it a "jugular" for India. By seizing Akhnur, India's overland supply route to Kashmir would be cut off.

Ayub Khan was mistaken. India's supply route to Kashmir did not pass through Akhnur. (The National Highway 1A passed through Udhampur and Ramban, not Akhnur.) General Akhtar Malik, who was in charge of both Gibraltar and Grand Slam, however understood the President's demand for a "jugular". He developed secret plans to proceed to Jammu after taking Akhnur, where he could cut off the highway. These plans were not revealed to the President, who would have apprehended the possibility of a general war.

Also mired in confusion were the conditions under which Grand Slam was to be launched. According to some sources Grand Slam was to be launched only after Gibraltar had succeeded. A failure of Gibraltar should have necessitated a rethink. According to others, Grand Slam itself was needed in order to "encash" Gibraltar. Neither Gibraltar nor Grand Slam had the full support of the Army Headquarters.

In addition to these confusions, there was also a technical issue. In order to avoid the possibility of a general war, Pakistan needed to make the operation appear to be a "localised conflict" in Kashmir. This meant launching its attack across the cease-fire line in Kashmir. (Note: This was a hang-over from 1947. At that time, India refrained from retaliating against Pakistan's attacks in Kashmir by crossing the international border. But India and Pakistan were British Dominion at that time with their militaries under the command of British officers. No such constraints operated in 1965.) But the operational plans for Grand Slam required the Pakistani forces to cross a "small section" of the border between Pakistani Punjab and Kashmir, which India regarded as an international border. (Note: In Pakistani theory, the border between Pakistani Punjab and Indian-administered Kashmir was a "working boundary", not an international border. India did not such recognise such a distinction. (Nawaz, Crossed Swords (2008, p. 207))) In the event, it made no difference to India which border the Pakistani forces crossed.

=== Indian weaknesses ===
Even though Akhnur was not the "jugular" that President Ayub Khan imagined, it was still a key choke point. It had the only bridge across the Chenab River in this area, on which ran the supply route to the western districts of Rajouri and Poonch. The bridge was capable of carrying only light tanks. It had not been strengthened over the years, despite warnings from various local commanders. (Note: Brigadier Joginder Singh states that the commander of the 26 Division had assessed that the Akhnur bridge would be a target in a Pakistani operation and recommended strengthening it. He was reportedly asked to "proceed on pension".) In addition, the cease-fire line was defended only lightly, as per the UN-mediated cease-fire agreement at the end of the First Kashmir War. It would be quickly overrun in the event of a full scale invasion.

At the time of the opening attack of Operation Grand Slam, the Chhamb Jaurian sector was defended on the Indian side by the 191st (Independent) Infantry Brigade, comprising three battalions, and supported by a squadron of 20 Lancers, which was equipped with AMX-13 light tanks.

=== Decision to launch ===
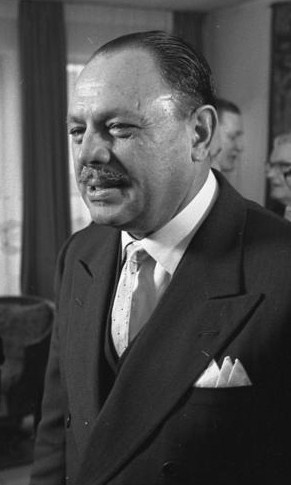
Pakistani President Ayub Khan, said to have had "loss of nerve and second thoughts" on ordering the Operation Grand Slam

The Operation Gibraltar went badly. The plan was to infiltrate thousands of troops into Jammu and Kashmir, India in the guise of 'mujahideen', who would carry out sabotage to demoralise the Indian forces and incite the local population to revolt. But the local population did not rise, the infiltrators were quickly identified, and the Indian Army began to hunt them down. In addition, the Indian Army moved across the cease-fire line to cut off the Pakistani infiltration routes and captured the Haji Pir pass in Azad Kashmir and some heights in the Kargil sector.

On 24 August, General Akhtar Malik started pressing the Army Headquarters for permission to launch the Operation Grand Slam. In his view, unless it was launched, it was only a matter of time before all the Gibraltar forces in Jammu and Kashmir, India would be captured or killed, and nothing would have been achieved from the whole operation. The Army referred the issue to the President, but Ayub Khan withheld approval. He went away to Swat to reflect on options. On 28 August, after the fall of the Haji Pir Pass, Malik briefed the Army chief. It was believed that India would take more territory unless something was done. The Army chief approached the foreign minister Zulfikar Ali Bhutto (later prime minister) to obtain the President's approval. Bhutto is cited by the Army officers as having been the main driving force behind the entire military operation, and he was also said to be close enough to Ayub Khan to obtain his approval.

Bhutto returned from Swat the next day with the President's order to

take such action that will defreeze the Kashmir problem, weaken Indian resolve, and bring her to the conference table without provoking a general war.

Ayub Khan also ordered the army to be prepared for Indian retaliation. He also warned the army that it would be a long struggle.

General Malik seemingly had his permission for the operation. But perhaps he didn't, because he knew fully well that he was provoking a general war contrary to the President's directive. (Note: The rest of the Army top brass would also seem to have ignored other aspects of the President's order because absolutely no preparations were made for facing Indian retaliation. Nor were supplies stockpiled for a long war. "General Ayub was told on the second day of the war by the Army Chief, General Musa Khan, that the Army had even run out of ammunition.")

== Execution ==
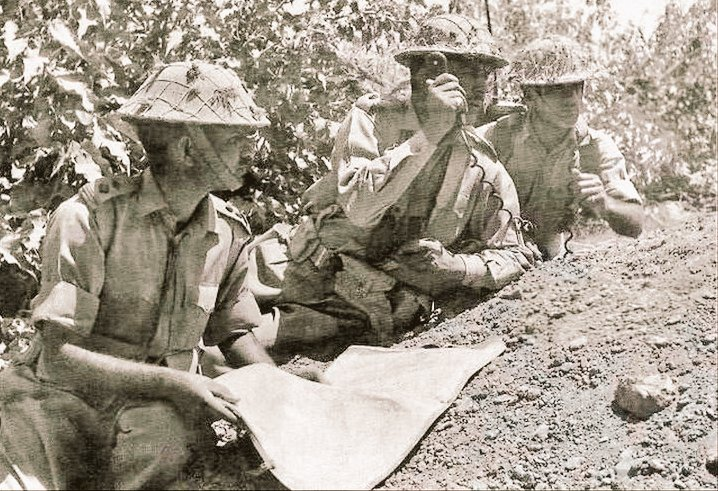
Pakistani troops in the Chamb−Jourian sector

The Pakistani Army commenced Operation Grand Slam at 0500 hours on 1 September 1965.

The Akhnoor sector was lightly defended by four Indian infantry battalions and a squadron of tanks. The infantry was stretched thin along the border and the AMX-13 tanks were no match for the Pakistani M47 Patton and M48 Patton tanks. Against a militarily stronger and larger Pakistani thrust, the Indian forces retreated from their defensive positions. According to Pakistani military historian Major (retd.) A. H. Amin, the Pakistani forces in Operation Grand Slam had a 6 to 1 advantage over Indian AMX-13 tanks, which were like 'matchboxes' in front of the Pakistani Pattons. In terms of artillery, Pakistan's 8-inch guns were superior to anything that Indians had at that time and had an overall superiority of 6 to 1. The Battle of Chumb was a major battle during the early stages of the operation.

On the second day of the attack, the GOC of the 12th Infantry Division Major General Akhtar Hussain Malik, commanding the overall forces in the area, was replaced by Major General Yahya Khan, the GOC of the 7th Infantry Division, which delayed the attack by one day. Not only did this decision cause confusion among the Pakistani officer cadre, but the delay also permitted the Indians to rush reinforcements to the sector. When the attack recommenced on 3 September, the Indian forces in the sector were sufficiently reinforced to hold out for a few more days, but they did not have the strength to launch a counterattack. As the attack carried on for two more days without any significant gains in territory, the Indian Army opened up a new front, on 6 September, across the sensitive state of Punjab in Pakistan. The advance of the Indian Army also threatened to cut across the right flank of the Pakistani attack. Realising the gravity of the threat, the Pakistani Army stopped its thrust into Kashmir and diverted forces to counter the Indian incursion.

== See also ==
- Line of Actual Control (LAC)

== Bibliography ==
- Abbas, Hassan (2015), Pakistan's Drift into Extremism: Allah, the Army, and America's War on Terror: Allah, the Army, and America's War on Terror, Routledge, ISBN 978-1-317-46328-3
- Bajwa, Farooq (2013), From Kutch to Tashkent: The Indo-Pakistan War of 1965, London: C. Hurst & Co, ISBN 978-1-84904-230-7
- Jamal, Arif (2009), Shadow War: The Untold Story of Jihad in Kashmir, Melville House, ISBN 978-1-933633-59-6
- Nawaz, Shuja (2008), Crossed Swords: Pakistan, Its Army, and the Wars Within, Oxford University Press, ISBN 978-0-19-547660-6
- Roy, Kaushik; Gates, Scott (2014), Unconventional Warfare in South Asia: Shadow Warriors and Counterinsurgency, Ashgate Publishing, Ltd., ISBN 978-1-4724-0579-1
- Sirrs, Owen L. (2016), Pakistan's Inter-Services Intelligence Directorate: Covert Action and Internal Operations, Routledge, ISBN 978-1-317-19609-9
- Van Praagh, David (2003), The Greater Game: India's Race with Destiny and China, McGill-Queen's Press - MQUP, ISBN 978-0-7735-2639-6
