= Alan Hugh Hornby =

British army officer

Major-General Alan Hugh Hornby CB CBE MC
- Born: 22 June 1894; Prescot, Lancashire, England
- Died: 28 October 1958 (aged 64)
- Military career
- Allegiance: United Kingdom
- Branch: British Army
- Service years: 1914–1948
- Rank: Major-General
- Service number: 8293
- Units: Royal Field Artillery; Royal Artillery
- Commands: 151st (Ayrshire Yeomanry) Field Regiment, Royal Artillery
- Conflicts: First World War; Second World War
- Awards: Companion of the Order of the Bath; Commander of the Order of the British Empire; Military Cross; Mentioned in Despatches (3); Commander of the Legion of Merit (United States)

Major-General Alan Hugh Hornby, CB, CBE, MC (22 June 1894 – 28 October 1958) was a British Army officer who served in both world wars.

== Military career ==
Born in 1894, Hornby was educated at Winchester College before going on to the Royal Military Academy at Woolwich. Upon his graduation from there on 17 July 1914, he received his commission as a second lieutenant in the Royal Field Artillery. As with many others of his generation, he fought in the First World War, seeing action on the Western Front where, promoted to lieutenant on 7 October 1915, he was wounded in action, mentioned in despatches, and awarded the Military Cross (MC).

Hornby's first few years of military service during the interwar period were spent in Iraq from 1919 to 1920. After marrying in 1923, he returned to England where he attended the Staff College, Camberley, from 1930 to 1931. From 1938 to 1939 he served as a staff officer at the War Office in London.

In 1940, as the Second World War entered its first year, Hornby, promoted on 24 May to lieutenant colonel, was briefly chief of staff at Combined Operations Headquarters. After serving from 1940 to 1941 as the Commander, Royal Artillery of the 46th Infantry Division, his service from then onwards was primarily overseas, notably in the Mediterranean theatre of the war, in Sicily and Italy. In 1943 he was appointed a Commander of the Order of the British Empire and on 1 June 1944 received a promotion to major-general. He commanded the 2nd Anti-Aircraft Group from 1945 to 1947.

After retiring from the army in 1948, Hornby, keen on both cricketing and sailing, was Commissioner of the Kent St. John Ambulance Brigade and Honorary Colonel of the Kent Auxiliary Cadet Force. From 1953 until his death in 1958 Hornby, a Freemason for more than half his life, was Colonel Commandant of the Royal Artillery.

== Bibliography ==
- Smart, Nick (2005). Biographical Dictionary of British Generals of the Second World War. Barnsley: Pen and Sword Books. ISBN 1844150496.
