= Jourian =

- Town
- Location in Jammu and Kashmir, India Jourian (India)
- Coordinates: 32.834°N 74.577°E
- Country: India
- Union Territory: Jammu and Kashmir
- District: Jammu
- Established: 1903
- Elevation: 274 m (899 ft)

Population (2001)
  - Total: 3,628

Languages
  - Official: Dogri, Hindi, English, Kashmiri, Urdu
- Time zone: UTC+5:30 (IST)
- PIN: 181202

Jourian is a town and a notified area committee in Jammu district in the Indian administered union territory of Jammu and Kashmir.

== History ==
See Operation Grand Slam in the Chumb-Jourian-Akhnoor sector.

== Geography ==
Jourian is located at 32.83°N 74.58°E. It has an average elevation of 274 metres (899 feet).

== Demographics ==
Religion in Jourian Town (2011)
1. Hinduism (97.2%)
2. Islam (0.81%)
3. Sikhism (0.69%)
4. Christianity (0.76%)
5. Not Stated (0.53%)

As of 2001 India census, Jourian had a population of 3628. Males constitute 51% of the population and females 49%. Jourian has an average literacy rate of 75%, higher than the national average of 59.5%: male literacy is 81%, and female literacy is 68%. In Jourian, 12% of the population is under 6 years of age.

In the 2011 census 97.20% of residents were Hindu, 0.69% were Sikh and 0.81% were Muslim.

== See also ==
- Line of Actual Control (LAC)
