= Chumb =

- City
- چھمب
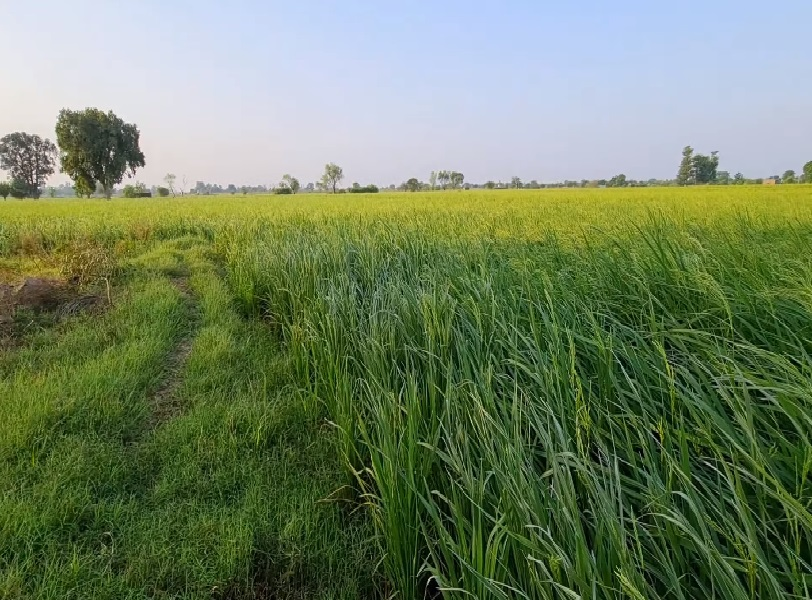

- Location within Azad Kashmir Location within Pakistan
- Coordinates: 32.837°N 74.386°E
- Country: Pakistan
- Autonomous Region: Azad Kashmir
- District: Bhimber District
- Tehsil: Barnala

Languages
  - Official: Urdu; Pahari-Pothwari; Punjabi

Chamb (Urdu: چھمب), also spelled Chamb, is a city in the southern tip of Azad Kashmir, Pakistan. The chamb sector consists of many villages, Barmala, kherowal Burejal Nagial, Paur Dhingawali, Moil, Chak Pandit, Praganwala, Jhanda, Singry, Sardari, Banian, Punjgran, Barila Sharif, all of these villages are located within Chamb sector. People are from various ethnic groups such as {Butt}{Rajpoot}Gujjars, Bakerwals, Paharis, Khokhars. A Baradari system is prevalent throughout the region.

The Pakistan Army has built its infrastructure in Chamb. Most people's languages are Urdu, Pahari-Pothwari and Punjabi. Chamb is also known as Iftikharabad due to Maj General Iftikhar Khan Janjua who played a key role in occupying Chamb. It is divided into two parts South Iftikharabad and North Iftikharabad. There is only one police station (Singry).

Chamb sector was under Indian control until the India–Pakistan war of 1971, when the Pakistan Army regained the area. Chumb is the last outpost of Pakistan's Azad Kashmir. Chamb has fertile land and farmlands can be found here.

== History ==
=== 1965 War ===
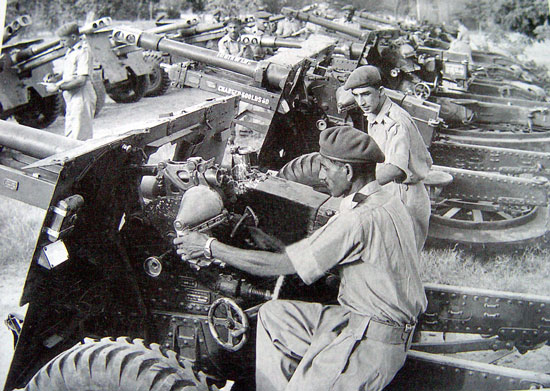
Pakistani troops inspect captured Indian QF 25-pounders after the Battle of Chamb, September 1965

Chumb came under the Indian side as per the 1949 cease-fire agreement. During the India–Pakistan war of 1965, the Pakistani troops invaded the Chamb-Jaurian sector of Indian-administered Kashmir as part of Operation Grand Slam, making significant gains and capturing Chamb. However, the status quo ante was reestablished in the Tashkent Agreement. This was a significant Pakistani victory in the operation.

=== 1971 War ===
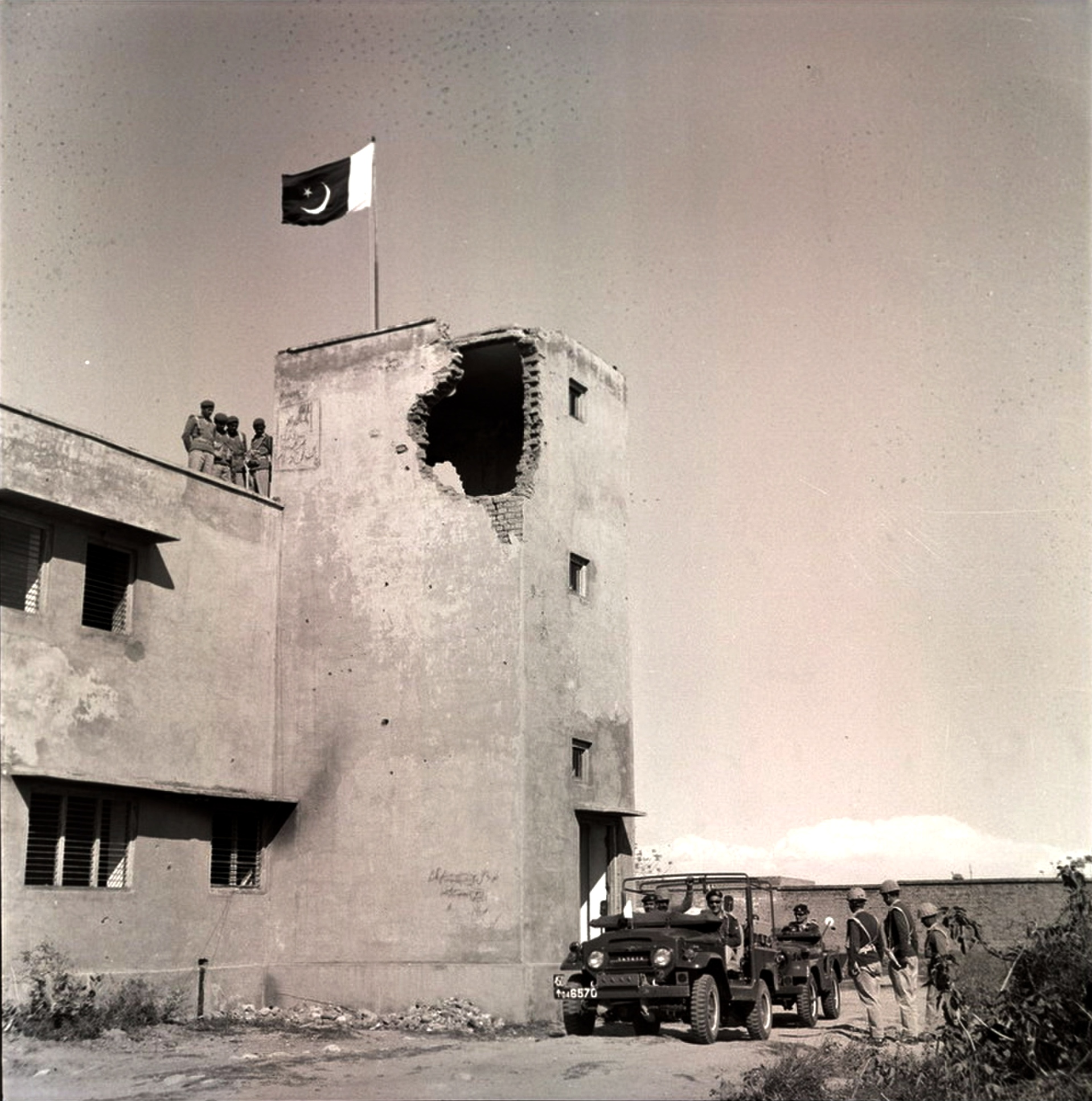
Pakistani troops hoist the Pakistani flag over Chamb, December 1971

The Pakistan Army made another attempt to capture this strategically important area and invaded Chamb on the same principles as it invaded in 1965. The reason behind this plan was to deter Indians from attacking the crucial north–south line of communications passing via Gujrat. The fighting around Chamb was intense and took a toll on both the advancing Pakistani troops and the Indian regiments. On 9 December 1971, the first Pakistani troops entered the surrounding area around Chumb under the personal supervision of Maj General Iftikhar Khan Janjua.

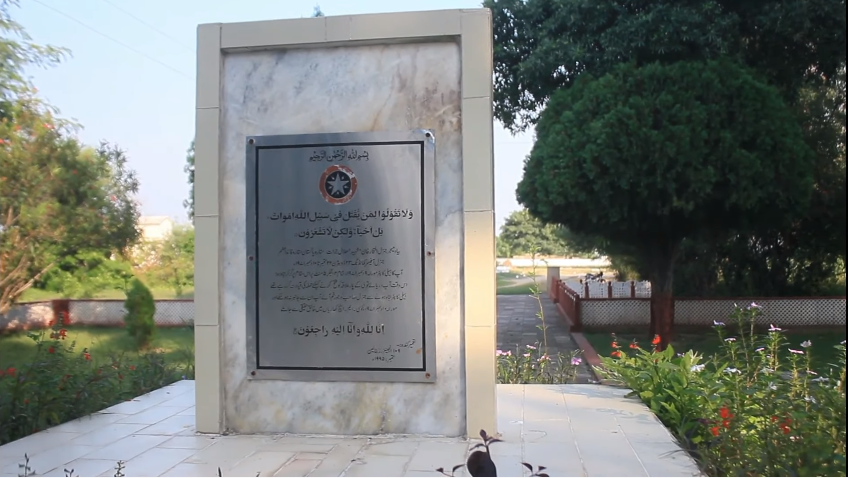
Memorial of Maj. General Iftikhar Khan Janjua in Chamb

A memorial of Major General Iftikhar Khan Janjua is located in Chumb where his helicopter crashed during the battle. He was immediately evacuated to CMH Kharian, but could not survive the wounds and succumbed- just days before Chamb was captured. He was awarded the Hilal-e-Jurat.

The Chumb sector had a population of around 10,000 people at the time it was captured. The area became a ghost town as most of its residents fled to India following the Pakistani takeover.

=== Since 1971 ===
In 2020, General Bajwa visited the Chamb sector and emphasised upon troops to extend all-out support to the local population affected by ceasefire violations.

== Education ==
A Boys College (Kherowal), a Girls College (Dingawali), a Boys High School (Porre), and a Girls High School (Punjgran) are located here. The people who belong to the south are Punjabi and the north is mostly Paharis and Gujjars from Rajauri. It is primarily agricultural land. The people are mostly farmers. The members of the Chackmerry community in Chamb are descendants of early Gujjar settlers who had arrived here from Rajauri in India.

== See also ==
- Line of Actual Control (LAC)
