= History of Beirut =

Settlement of Beirut on island in Beirut River

The earliest settlement of Beirut was on an island in the Beirut River, but the channel that separated it from the banks silted up and the island ceased to be. Excavations in the downtown area have unearthed layers of Phoenician, Hellenistic, Roman, Byzantine, Arab, Crusader, and Ottoman remains.

== Prehistory ==
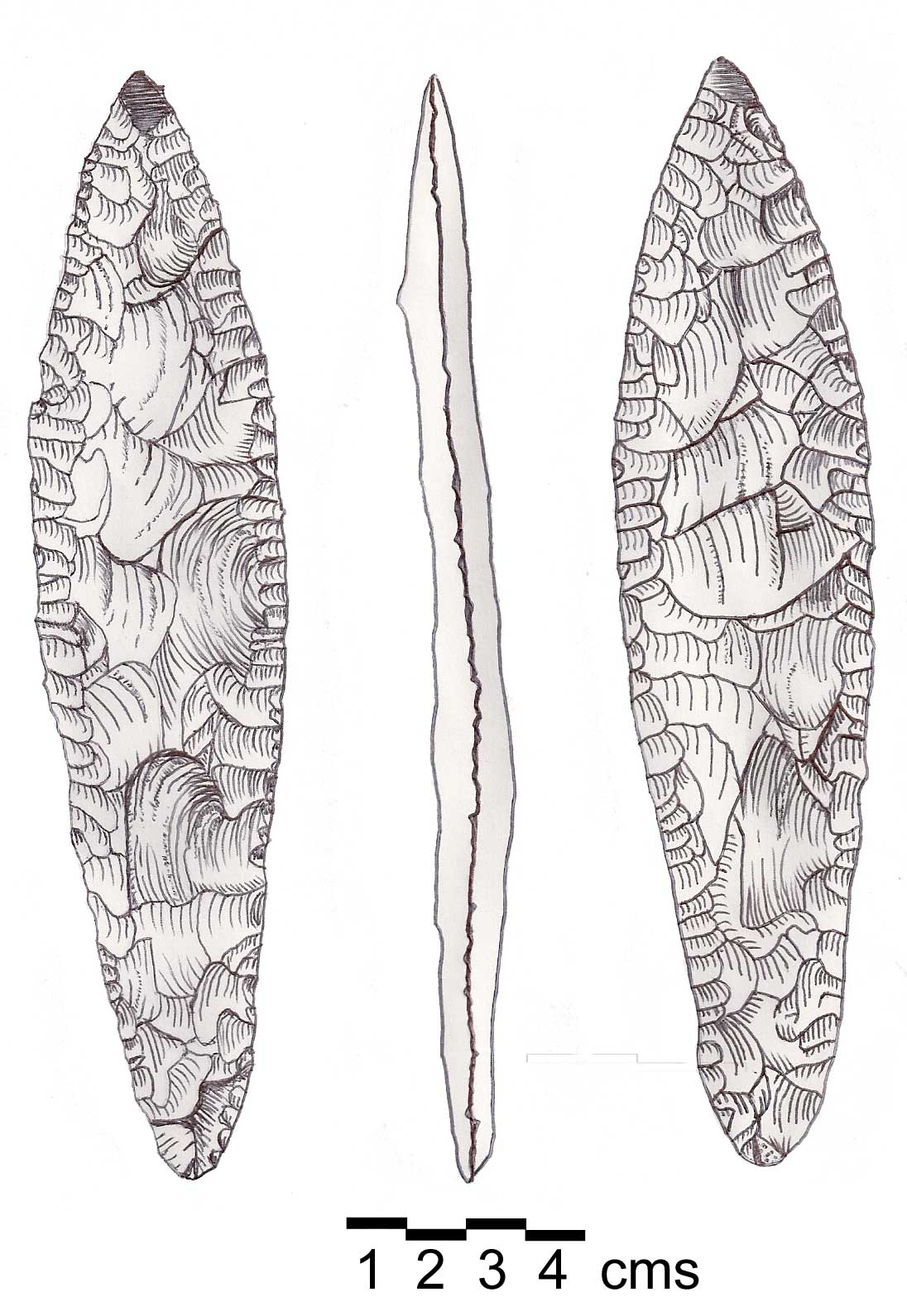
Canaanean Blade. Suggested to be part of a javelin. Fresh grey flint, both sides showing pressure flaking. Somewhat narrower at the base, suggesting a haft. Polished at the extreme point. Found on land of the Lebanese Evangelical School for Girls in the Patriarchate area of Beirut.

Beirut was settled over 5,000 years ago, and there is evidence that the surrounding area had already been inhabited for tens of thousands of years prior to this. Several prehistoric archaeological sites have been discovered within the urban area of Beirut, revealing flint tools from sequential periods dating from the Middle Palaeolithic and Upper Paleolithic through the Neolithic to the Bronze Age.

Beirut I (Minet el-Hosn) was listed as "the town of Beirut" (French: Beyrouth ville) by Louis Burkhalter and said to be on the beach near the Orient and Bassoul hotels on the Avenue des Français in central Beirut. The site was discovered by Lortet in 1894 and discussed by Godefroy Zumoffen in 1900. The flint industry from the site was described as Mousterian and is held by the Museum of Fine Arts of Lyon.

Beirut II (Umm el-Khatib) was suggested by Burkhalter to have been south of Tarik el Jedideh, where P.E. Gigues discovered a Copper Age flint industry at around 100 metres (328 feet) above sea level. The site had been built on and destroyed by 1948.

Beirut III (Furn esh-Shebbak), listed as Plateau Tabet, was suggested to have been located on the left bank of the Beirut River. Burkhalter suggested that it was west of the Damascus road, although this determination has been criticized by Lorraine Copeland. P. E. Gigues discovered a series of Neolithic flint tools on the surface along with the remains of a structure suggested to be a hut circle. Auguste Bergy discussed polished axes that were also found at this site, which has now completely disappeared as a result of construction and urbanization of the area.

Beirut IV (Furn esh-Shebbak, river banks) was also on the left bank of the river and on either side of the road leading eastwards from the Furn esh Shebbak police station towards the river that marked the city limits. The area was covered in red sand that represented Quaternary river terraces. The site was found by Jesuit Father Dillenseger and published by fellow Jesuits Godefroy Zumoffen, Raoul Describes and Auguste Bergy. Collections from the site were made by Bergy, Describes and another Jesuit, Paul Bovier-Lapierre. Many Middle Paleolithic flint tools were found on the surface and in side gullies that drain into the river. They included around 50 varied bifaces accredited to the Acheulean period, some with a lustrous sheen, now held at the Museum of Lebanese Prehistory. Henri Fleisch also found an Emireh point amongst material from the site, which has now disappeared beneath buildings.

Beirut V (Nahr Beirut, Beirut River) was discovered by Dillenseger and said to be in an orchard of mulberry trees on the left bank of the river, near the river mouth, and to be close to the railway station and bridge to Tripoli. Levallois flints and bones and similar surface material were found amongst brecciated deposits. The area has now been built on.

Beirut VI (Patriarchate) was a site discovered while building on the property of the Lebanese Evangelical School for Girls in the Patriarchate area of Beirut. It was notable for the discovery of a finely styled Canaanean blade javelin suggested to date to the early or middle Neolithic periods of Byblos and which is held in the school library.

Beirut VII, the Rivoli Cinema and Byblos Cinema sites near the Bourj in the Rue el Arz area, are two sites discovered by Lorraine Copeland, Peter Wescombe, and Marina Hayek in 1964 and examined by Diana Kirkbride and Roger Saidah. One site was behind the parking lot of the Byblos Cinema and showed collapsed walls, pits, floors, charcoal, pottery and flints. The other, overlooking a cliff west of the Rivoli Cinema, was composed of three layers resting on limestone bedrock. Fragments of blades and broad flakes were recovered from the first layer of black soil, above which some Bronze Age pottery was recovered in a layer of grey soil. Pieces of Roman pottery and mosaics were found in the upper layer. Middle Bronze Age tombs were found in this area, and the ancient tell of Beirut is thought to be in the Bourj area.

== Phoenician period ==
The Phoenician port of Beirut was located between Rue Foch and Rue Allenby on the north coast. The port or harbour was excavated and reported on several years ago and now lies buried under the city. Another suggested port or dry dock was claimed to have been discovered around 1 kilometre (0.62 miles) to the west in 2011 by a team of Lebanese archaeologists from the Directorate General of Antiquities of Lebanese University. Controversy arose on 26 June 2012 when authorization was given by Lebanese Minister of Culture Gaby Layoun for a private company called Venus Towers Real Estate Development Company to destroy the ruins (archaeological site BEY194) in the $500 million construction project of three skyscrapers and a garden behind Hotel Monroe in downtown Beirut. Two later reports by an international committee of archaeologists appointed by Layoun, including Hanz Curver, and an expert report by Ralph Pederson, a member of the institute of Nautical Archaeology and now teaching in Marburg, Germany, dismissed the claims that the trenches were a port, on various criteria. The exact function of site BEY194 may never be known, and the issue raised heated emotions and led to increased coverage on the subject of Lebanese heritage in the press.

== Hellenistic period ==
In 140 BC, the Phoenician city was destroyed by Diodotus Tryphon during his conflict with Antiochus VII Sidetes for the throne of the Hellenistic Seleucid monarchy. Laodicea in Phoenicia was built upon the same site on a more conventional Hellenistic plan. Present-day Beirut overlies this ancient one, and little archaeology was carried out until after the civil war in 1991. The salvage excavations after 1993 have yielded new insights into the layout and history of this period of Beirut's history. Public architecture included several areas and buildings.

Mid-1st-century coins from Berytus bear the head of Tyche, goddess of fortune; on the reverse, the city's symbol appears: a dolphin entwines an anchor. This symbol was later taken up by the early printer Aldus Manutius in 15th century Venice. After a state of civil war and decline the Seleucid Empire faced, King Tigranes the Great of the Kingdom of Armenia conquered Beirut and placed it under effective Armenian control. However, after the Battle of Tigranocerta, Armenia forever lost their holdings in Syria and Beirut was conquered by Roman general Pompey.

== Roman period ==
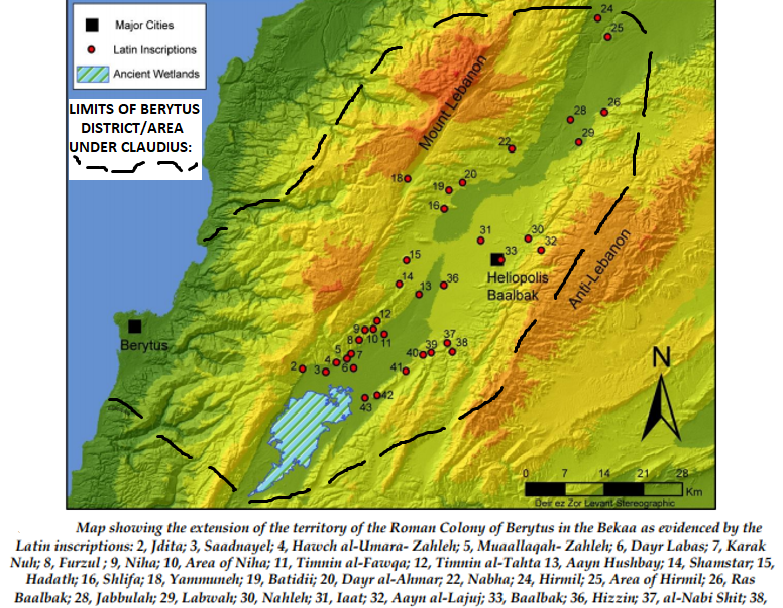
Map showing the Roman Berytus district

Laodicea was conquered by Pompey in 64 BC and the name Berytus was restored to it. The city was assimilated into the Roman Empire, soldiers were sent there, and large building projects were undertaken. From the 1st century BC, the Bekaa Valley served as a source of grain for the Roman provinces of the Levant and even for Rome itself. Under Claudius, Berytus expanded to reach the Bekaa Valley and include Heliopolis (Baalbek). The city was settled by Roman colonists who promoted agriculture in the region.

As a result of this settlement, the city quickly became Romanized, and the city became the only mainly Latin-speaking area in the Syria-Phoenicia province. In 14 BC, during the reign of Herod the Great, Berytus became a colony, one of four in the Syria-Phoenicia region and the only one with full Italian rights (ius Italicum) exempting its citizens from imperial taxation. Beirut was considered the most Roman city in the eastern provinces of the Roman Empire. Furthermore, the veterans of two Roman legions were established in the city of Berytus by emperor Augustus: the 5th Macedonian and the 3rd Gallic Legions.

The Lebanese Roman Latin grammarian, literature master, philologist and critic Marcus Valerius Probus, who flourished under the reign of Nero, was born in Berytus, c. AD 25., in the same century, the Judean ruler Agrippa II expended large sums in beautifying Berytus, a Hellenised city in Phoenicia. His partiality for the Lebanese city rendered him unpopular amongst his Jewish subjects. There was a Christian presence in Berytus since the first century, with the discipline Quartus being the bishop of Berytus c. AD 50, and according to tradition, Thaddeus, together with Simon the Zealot, both apostles of Jesus, suffered martyrdom about AD 65 in Beirut.

Shortly after the acclamation of Vespasian as Roman emperor had occurred at Alexandria on July 1, Vespasian and Mucianus – a prominent senator, governor of Syria, and a man who had been instrumental in persuading Vespasian to bid for the imperial throne – held a conference at Berytus, planning their campaign in mid-July, AD 69. There is evidence in the 1st century works of Josephus of substantial Jewish interest in silk, both in trade and production, especially in Berytus and Tyre. In the Roman period, Jiyeh was a production site of Beirut Type 2 amphorae (Note: The form – Beirut Type 1 – has a projecting rim and fairly large handles. Beirut Type 2 is similar to the first form with a more defined rim and was produced in the Augustan period, suddenly ending by the late 1st century CE.) transporting olive oil from the 1st century AD onwards.

During the 2nd century, the 115 Antioch earthquake in which Beirut suffers significant damage, occurred on 13 December 115 AD. In the same century, after the death of the Roman emperor Commodus, a civil war erupted, in which Berytus, and Sidon supported Pescennius Niger. While the city of Tyre supported Septimius Severus.

Berytus's law school was widely known; in 238 or 239 AD, the city was first mentioned in writing as a major center for the study of law in the panegyric of Gregory Thaumaturgus, the bishop of Neo-Caesarea The 3rd-century emperors Diocletian and Maximian issued constitutions exempting the students of the law school of Beirut from compulsory service in their hometowns. and two of Rome's most famous jurists, Papinian and Ulpian, were natives of Phoenicia and taught there under the Severan emperors. When Justinian assembled his Pandects in the 6th century, a large part of the corpus of laws was derived from these two jurists, and in AD 533 Justinian recognised the school as one of the three official law schools of the empire.

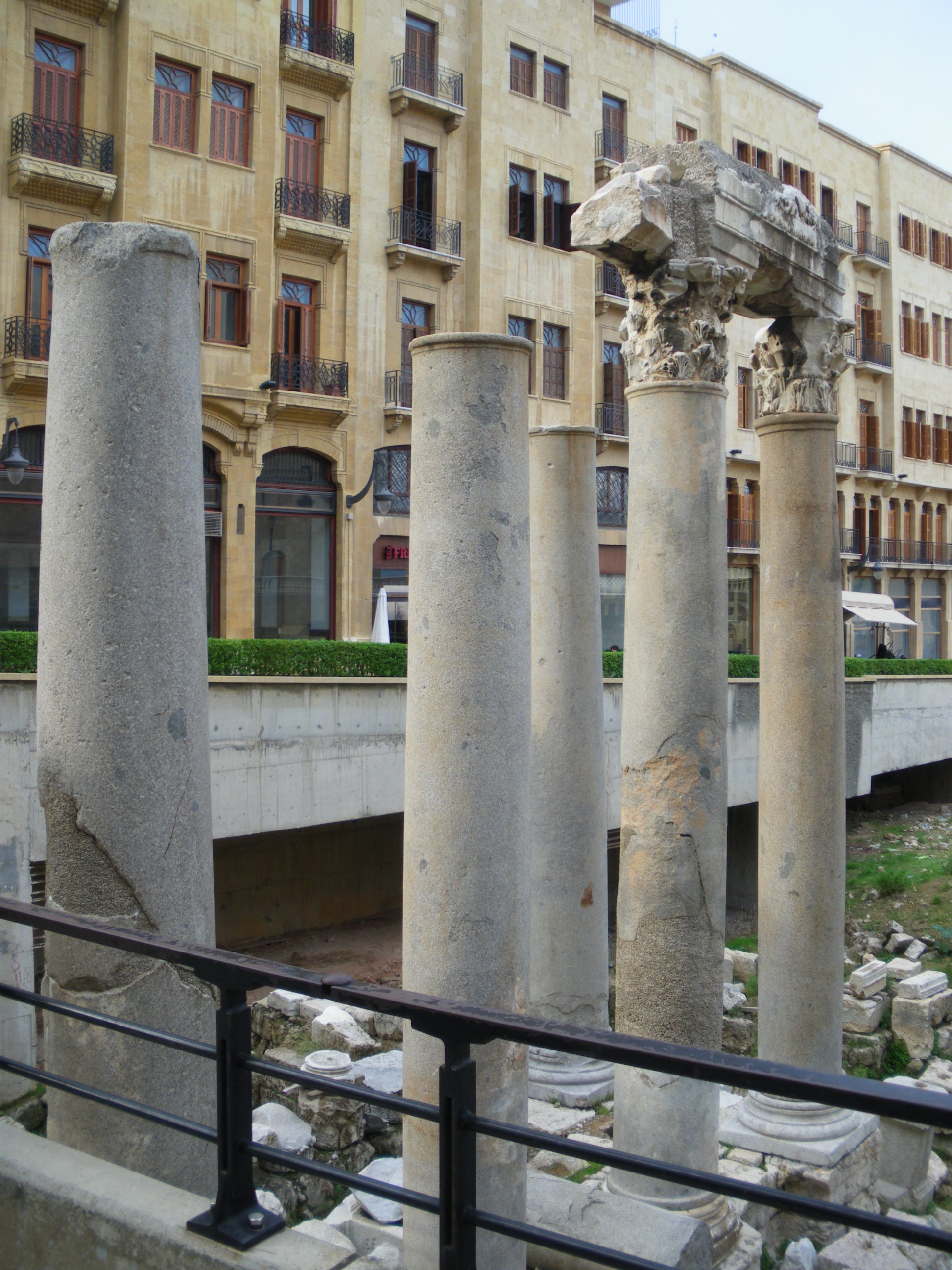
Roman Columns of Basilica near the Forum of Berytus

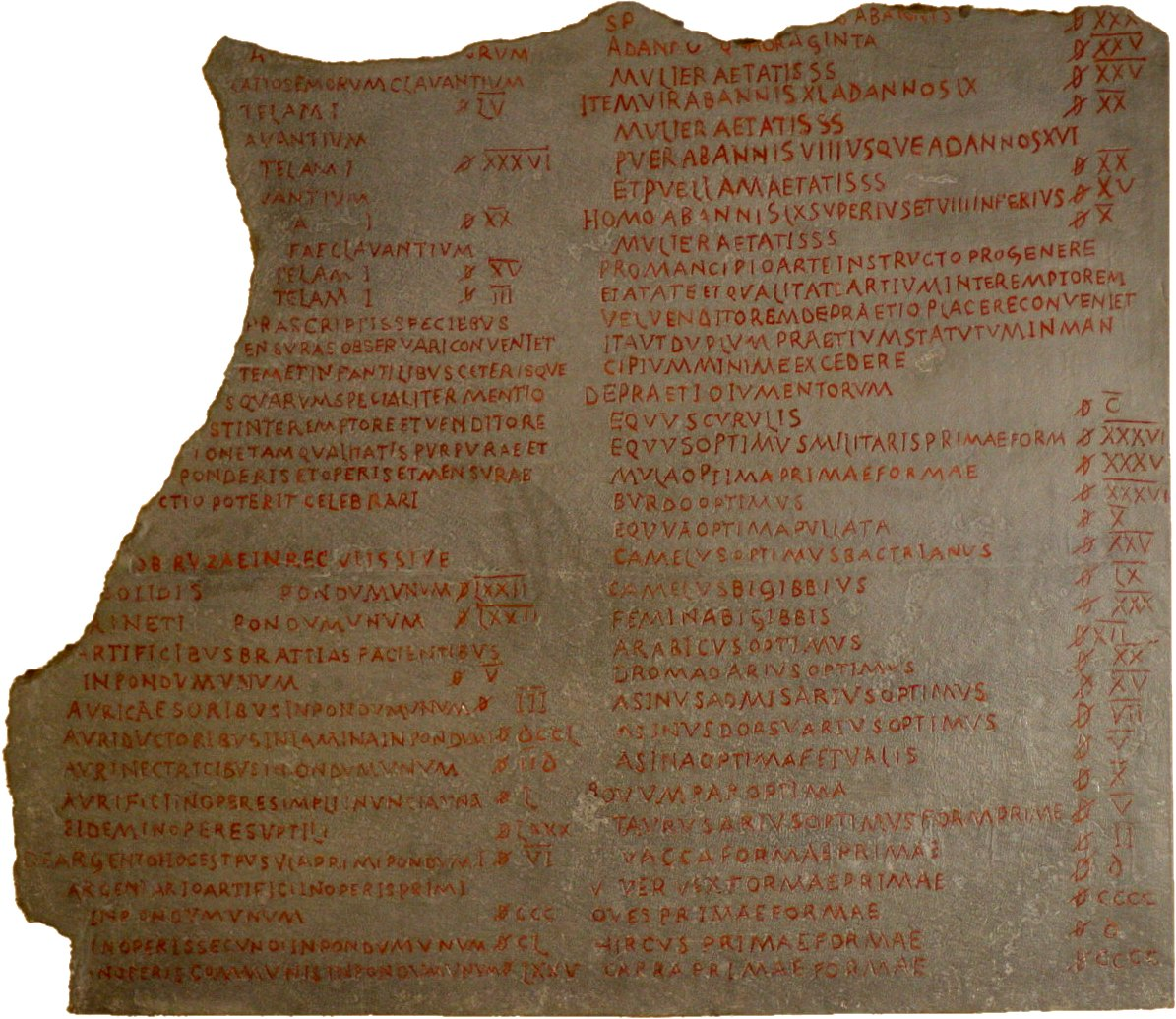
Piece of the Edict on Maximum Prices in the Pergamon Museum, Berlin

In the 4th century, the Edict on Maximum Prices was issued by the emperor Diocletian in 301 AD, with the prices and simulated sailing times from Nicomedia to Beirut reported to be 12 denarii for 9.9 days of duration with the ratio (price/duration) being 0.83. Two years after the beginning of the anti-Christian Diocletianic persecution, Aphian, a student of the Law school of Berytus, was martyred on April 2 c. 305 AD, and Pamphilus of Caesarea, a biblical scholar from a rich and honorable family of Beirut, was martyred in February 16, 309. The Diocletianic Persecutions have ended with the reign of the emperor Constantine the Great, with him getting baptized by the once-bishop of Beirut, Eusebius of Nicomedia, right before his death on 22 May 337.

Historically, Roman stationes or auditoria, where teaching was done, stood next to public libraries housed in temples. This arrangement was copied in the Roman colony at Beirut. The first mention of the premises of the law school of Berytus dates to 350.

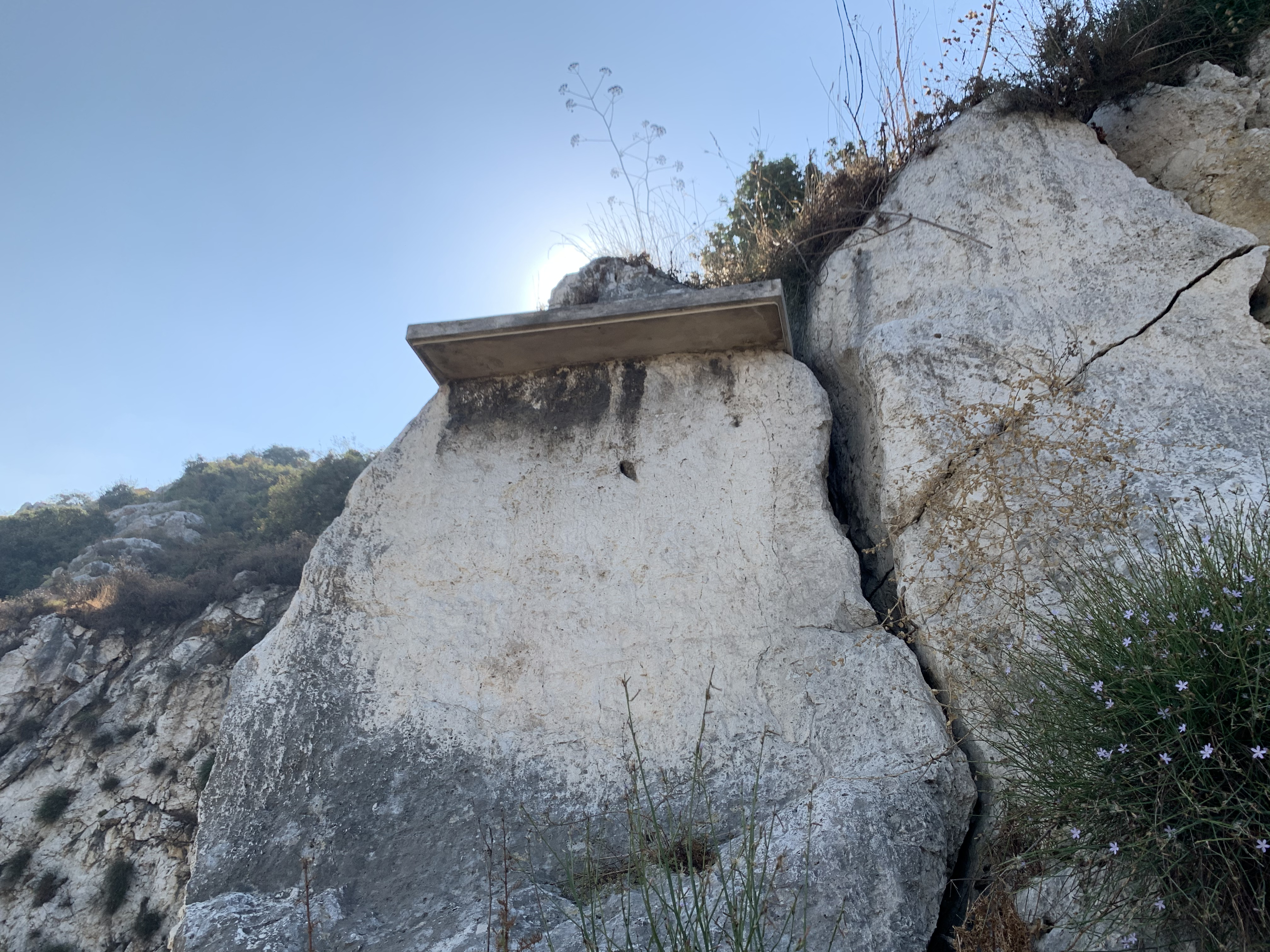
Commemorative inscription of Proculus (Inscription #11), Nahr el-Kalb. (Zoom-in for epigraphic details)

Proculus, governor of Phoenicia, was Comes Orientis between 383 and 384. During this time, his name was carved on the Commemorative stela of Nahr el-Kalb.

== Byzantine period ==
By the 5th century, the law school of Berytus had established its leading position and repute among the Empire's law schools; its teachers were highly regarded and played a chief role in the development of legal learning in the East to the point that they were dubbed “ecumenical masters”. From 425, the law school of Constantinople became a rival center of law study.

In 460 AD, the emperor Leo I issued an edict that orders candidates for the bar of the Eastern praetorian prefecture to produce certificates of proficiency from the law teachers who instruct them at one of the recognized law schools of the Empire. As a result, learning law at the law school of Berytus became highly desired. Ecclesiastically, the rank of the See of Tyre was challenged by the see of Berytus c. 450; during which Berytus obtained from Theodosius II the title of metropolis, with jurisdiction over six sees taken from Tyre; that was until it was decided in 451 AD in the Council of Chalcedon to restore the jurisdiction of the six sees Berytus obtained, back to Tyre, leaving, however, to Berytus its rank of metropolis. Thus, from 451 AD Berytus was an exempt metropolis which depended directly on the Patriarch of Antioch.

Justinian I closed down the law schools of Alexandria, Caesarea Maritima and Athens in 529 because their teachings contradicted those of the Christian faith, subsequently, the law school of Berytus and Constantinople were now the only law schools maintained during the reign of Justinian I, with the emperor, in 533 AD, bestowing the law school of Berytus with the title Berytus Nutrix Legum (Beirut, Mother of Laws) in his Omnem constitution.

=== 551 earthquake ===
In 551, a major earthquake struck Berytus, causing widespread damage. The earthquake reduced cities along the coast to ruins and killed many, 30,000 in Berytus alone by some measurements. As a result, the students of the law school were transferred to Sidon. It triggered a devastating tsunami which affected the coastal towns of Byzantine Phoenicia, causing great destruction and sinking many ships. The earthquake was felt over a wide area from Alexandria in the southwest to Antioch in the north previously damaged by the earthquake of 526. The area of felt intensity of VIII or more extends from Tripoli in the north to Tyre in the south. Estimates for the magnitude vary from 7.2 on the surface wave magnitude scale to a possible 7.5 on the moment magnitude scale. The rupture length is estimated to be greater than 100 kilometres (62 mi) and possibly as long as 150 kilometres (93 mi).

Misfortune hit Beirut again in 560 AD with a massive fire ravaging the recovering city, as a result, all hopes for the Law school of Berytus to be opened again were lost.

Salvage excavations since 1993 have yielded new insights in the layout and history of Roman Berytus. Public architecture included several bath complexes, Colonnaded Streets, a circus and theatre; residential areas were excavated in the Garden of Forgiveness, Martyrs' Square and the Beirut Souks.

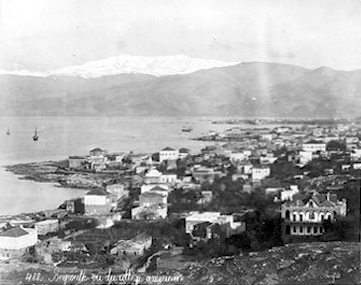
View of Beirut with snow-capped Mount Sannine in the background – 19th century

== Middle Ages ==
=== Rashidun period ===
Beirut was conquered by the Muslims in 635. Yazid ibn Abi Sufyan was at the forefront of the Islamic army, which headed to Lebanon with Yazid's half-brother, Muawiyah. He marched to Sidon, Beirut, and Jbeil, while Khalid bin Al-Walid entered the Bekaa region reaching Baalbek. Amongst the companions of the Islamic Prophet Muhammad: Abu al-Darda’ stayed in Beirut shortly after its conquest by Muawiyah and Yazid, and Salman Al Farsi and the son of Abu Dhar al-Ghifari also stayed in the city.

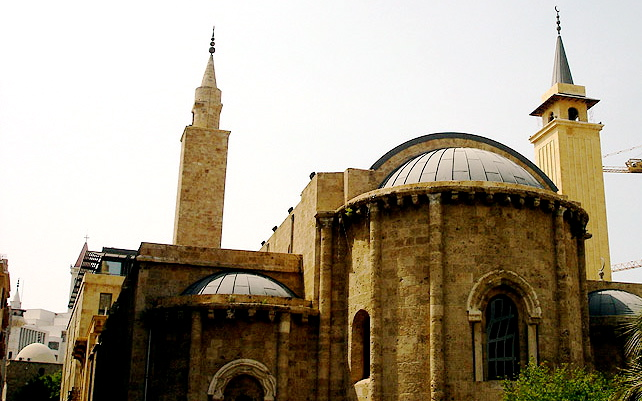
Al-Omari Grand Mosque in Beirut

During the Rashidun era, Al-Omari Grand Mosque, (ٱلْمَسْجِد ٱلْعُمَرِيّ ٱلْكَبِير) was built during the reign of Islam's second Caliph Umar Bin El Khattab in 635 AD.

=== Umayyad period ===
After the rise of the Umayyad Caliphate, the Byzantines raided the Lebanese coast in an attempt to liberate christian Lebanon from the arab muslim invaders/colonizers, as result, a mission of naval defense along the Levantine coast was entrusted to the commander of the sea, which meant Al-Aswad bin Bilal Al-Muharibi going out to chase the Byzantine liberators during their attack on a merchant ship at the frontier of Beirut in 730 AD.

=== Abbasid period ===
After the fall of the Umayyads, the rise of the Abbasids in 750 AD led to the escalation of Mardaite and Byzantine raids, subsequently, it became imperative for the Abbasid Caliph al-Manṣūr to fight back with combat to defend the Caliphate. He mobilized the frontiers with fighters to protect them. He assigned the Tanukhid tribes to head to the mountains of Beirut to protect the coasts of the Levant and Islamic possessions from the Byzantine danger and local hostile movements.

When Al Mansur came to Syria in the year 142 AH / 758 AD, Prince Mundhir and Prince Arslan came from their homeland in Maarrat al-Nu`man with a group of their clan and they met him in As-Sham, where he had heard about their courage in fighting the Byzantines in Antioch and its suburbs, so he welcomed them and assigned them to go with their people to the mountains of Beirut to protect the coasts and frontiers in which he made them leaders of several fiefs. Prince Arslan bin al-Mundhir founded the Principality of Sin el Fil in Beirut in 759. From this principality developed the later Principality of Mount Lebanon, which was the basis for the establishment of Greater Lebanon, today's Lebanon.

Islamic fiqh and Hadith studies went through a golden age in Beirut during the 8th century with the flourishing of the Baalbek-born Imam of Beirut Al-Awzai, his tomb is currently found in Beirut and it is the only Abbasid remain left in the city.

=== Fatimid period ===
During the Fatimid rule, the Byzantine Emperor John I Tzimiskes gained Beirut in 974 and stayed there for about a year before getting expelled by Egyptian forces, and in 975, Tzimiskes's forces retook Beirut from the forces of the Turkic Anti-Fatimid military general Aftakin in which he brought with him an allegedly wonderworking icon of Christ from the era of Athanasius from the city to Constantinople. One of the final direct Byzantine attacks on the city was made by the emperor Basil II, when he led a raid against Beirut in December of 999.

=== 1110 siege and Lordship of Beirut ===
As a trading center of the eastern Mediterranean, Beirut was overshadowed by Acre (in modern-day Israel) during the Middle Ages. By February 1110, the Genoese and Pisan ships started to blockade the harbour, Fatimid ships from Tyre and Sidon tried in vain to break the blockade. In the meantime, the Beirut's defenders destroyed one siege tower, but the attackers managed to build another two to storm the walls.

Jacques de Vitry, a historian of the Crusades, reported:

Our people lay siege to Beyrout both by sea and land, and being joined by Bertram, the noble count of Tripoli, after a two months' siege, having brought wooden towers up to the walls and joined them to the walls by ladders, forced their way into the city, and slew many of the citizens, cast the rest into chains and held them captive . . . Beyrout is a city on the seashore between Sidon and Biblium in the country of Phoenicia ... it is fertile and fair, with fruit trees, woods and vineyards.

Moreover, William of Tyre wrote that Baldwin and Bertrand ordered galleys from the nearby controlled ports to blockade Beirut, while constructing all siege towers, ladders, bridges and catapults from the pine trees in the neighborhood. The defenders had to defend the walls with no rest by day and by night for two months, until some crusaders managed to leap over the walls to open the gates for the attackers. With the gates being open, the inhabitants escaped to the port, yet the blockade forced them to retreat, hence they became trapped between two enemies.

However, the Fatimid governor fled by night through the Italian fleet to Cyprus. On 13 May 1110, Baldwin captured the city by assault after a seventy-five-day siege. The Italians conducted a massacre among the inhabitants, in which 20,000 Arabs might have been possibly killed by the attackers in Beirut.

From 1110 to 1291, the town and Lordship of Beirut was part of the Kingdom of Jerusalem. The city was taken by Saladin in 1187 and recaptured in 1197 by Henry I of Brabant as part of the German Crusade of 1197. John of Ibelin, known as the Old Lord of Beirut, was granted the lordship of the city in 1204. He rebuilt the city after its destruction by the Ayyubids and also built the House of Ibelin palace in Beirut.

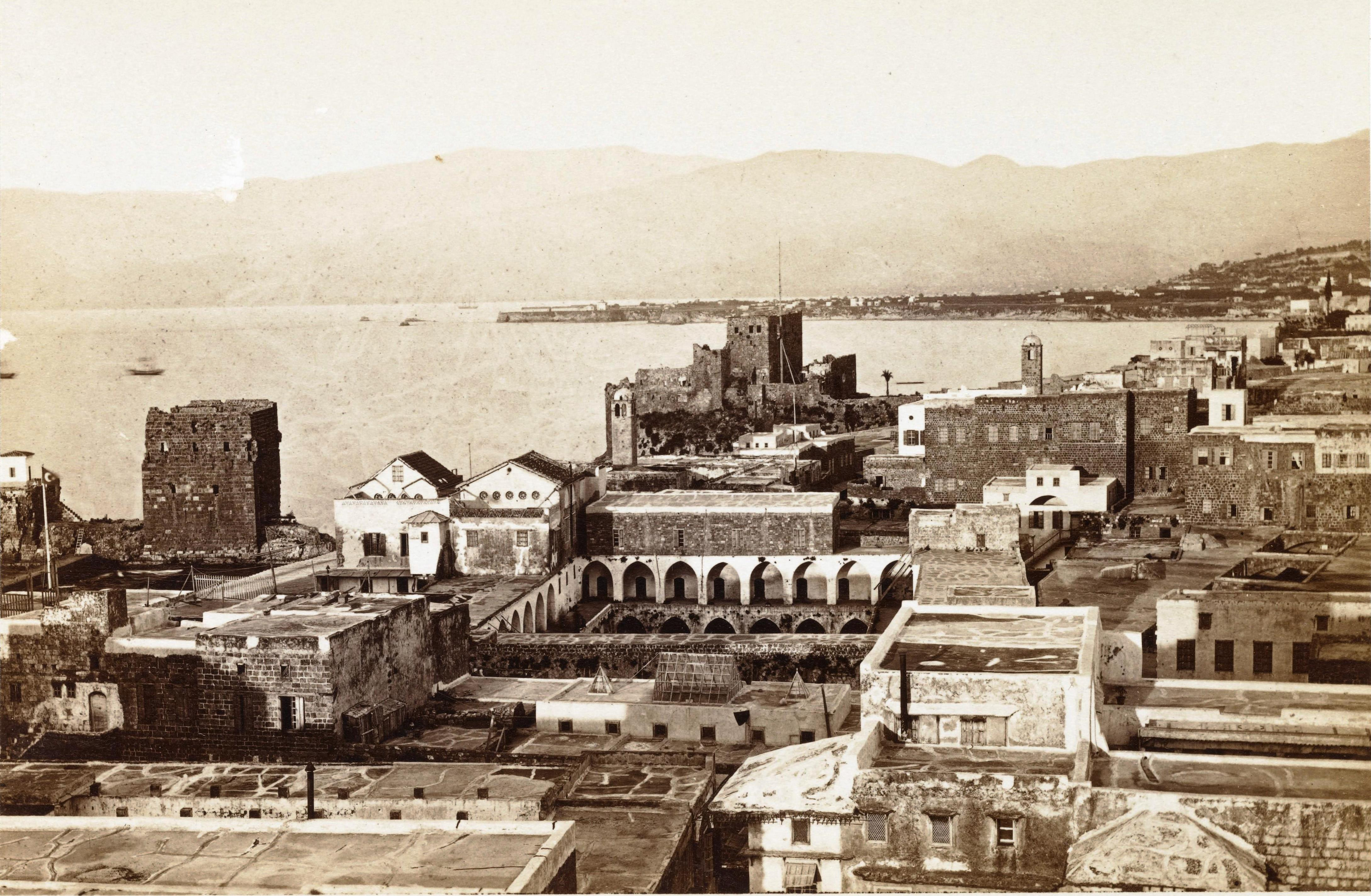
Beirut Castle and waterfront, 1868

In 1291 Beirut was captured and the Crusaders expelled by the Mamluk army of Sultan al-Ashraf Khalil.

== Ottoman rule ==
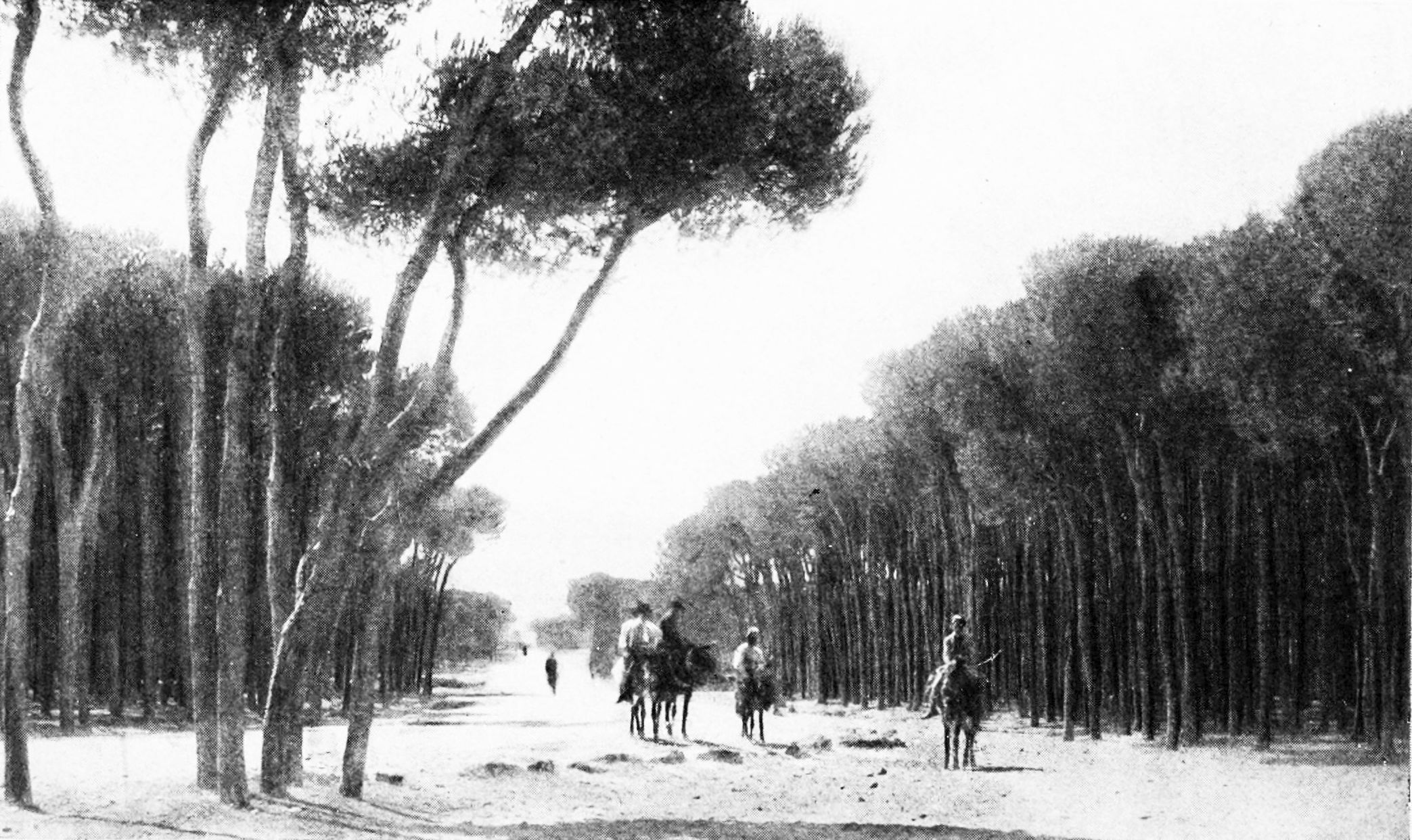
Stone pine Forest of Beirut, 1914

Under the Ottoman sultan Selim I (1512–1520), the Ottomans conquered Syria including present-day Lebanon. Beirut was controlled by local Druze emirs throughout the Ottoman period. One of them, Fakhr-al-Din II, fortified it early in the 17th century, but the Ottomans reclaimed it in 1763. With the help of Damascus, Beirut successfully broke Acre's monopoly on Syrian maritime trade and for a few years supplanted it as the main trading center in the region. During the succeeding epoch of rebellion against Ottoman hegemony in Acre under Jezzar Pasha and Abdullah Pasha, Beirut declined to a small town with a population of about 10,000 and was an object of contention between the Ottomans, the local Druze, and the Mamluks. After Ibrahim Pasha of Egypt captured Acre in 1832, Beirut began its revival.

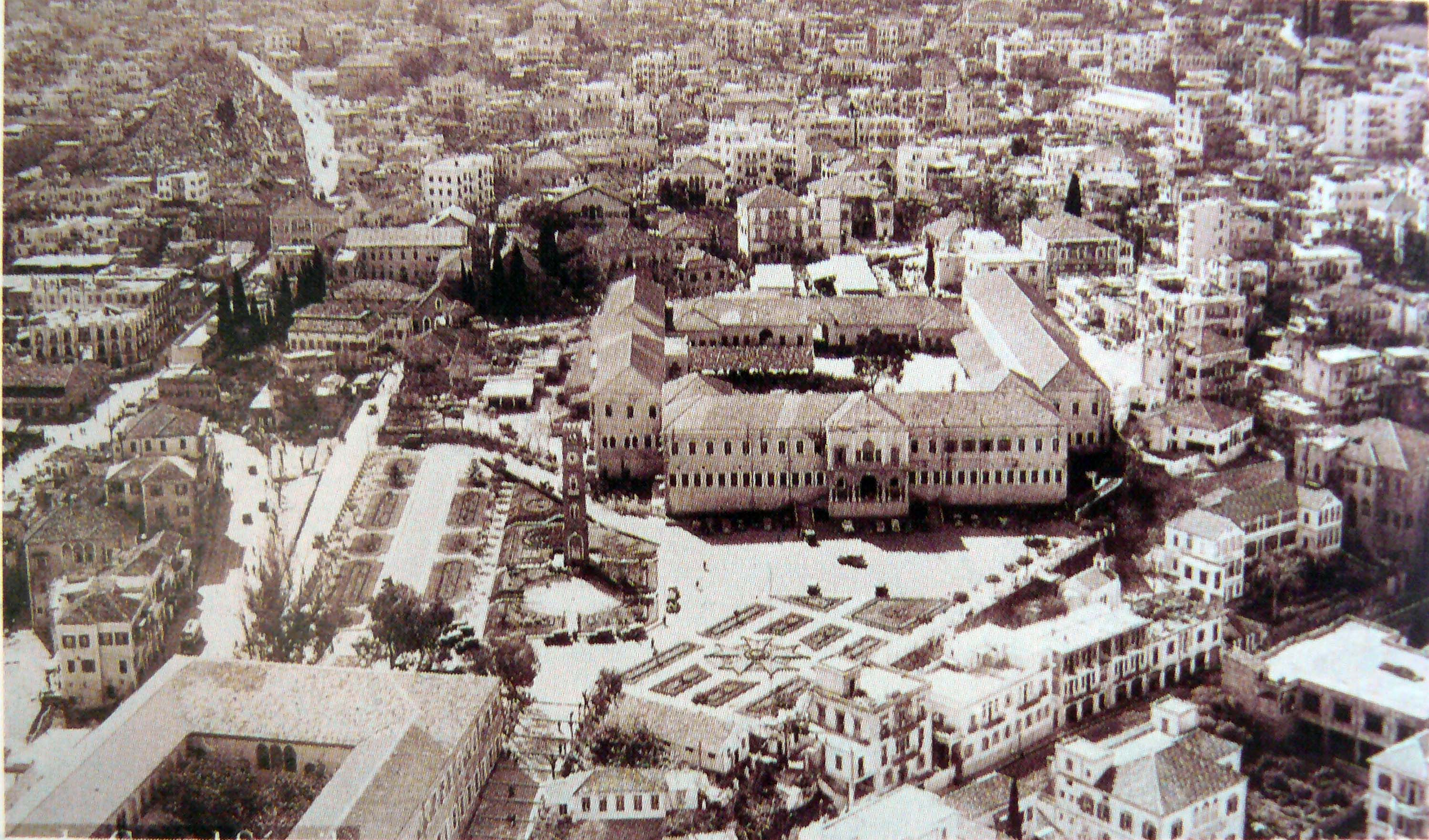
View of Beirut's Grand Serail- circa 1930

By the second half of the nineteenth century, Beirut was developing close commercial and political ties with European imperial powers, particularly France. European interests in Lebanese silk and other export products transformed the city into a major port and commercial center. This boom in cross-regional trade allowed certain groups, such as the Sursock family, to establish trade and manufacturing empires that further strengthened Beirut's position as a key partner in the interests of imperial dynasties. Meanwhile, Ottoman power in the region continued to decline. Sectarian and religious conflicts, power vacuums, and changes in the political dynamics of the region culminated in the 1860 Lebanon conflict. Beirut became a destination for Maronite Christian refugees fleeing from the worst areas of the fighting on Mount Lebanon and in Damascus. This in turn altered the religious composition of Beirut itself, sowing the seeds of future sectarian and religious troubles there and in greater Lebanon. However, Beirut was able to prosper in the meantime. This was again a product of European intervention, and also a general realization amongst the city's residents that commerce, trade, and prosperity depended on domestic stability. After petitions by the local bourgeois, the governor of Syria Vilayet Mehmed Rashid Pasha authorized the establishment of the Beirut Municipal Council, the first municipality established in the Arab provinces of the Empire. The council was elected by an assembly of city notables and played an instrumental role governing the city through the following decades.

=== Russian occupations ===
The Russian occupations of Beirut were two separate military expeditions by squadrons of the Imperial Russian Navy's Mediterranean Fleet, with the first one taking place in June 1772 and the second one from October 1773 to early 1774. They formed part of its Levant campaign during the larger Russo-Turkish War of 1768–1774. Russia's main objective in this campaign was to assist local forces led by Egypt's autonomous ruler, Ali Bey al-Kabir, who was in open rebellion against the Ottoman Empire.

The newly assembled coalition, wishing to exploit the Ottoman setback in Sidon, decided to send the Russian squadron to the small port town of Beirut, which was controlled at the time by the Druze. According to the researcher William Persen, the aim of this expedition was to both preoccupy the Druze and punish them for siding with the Porte. Blockading their port would achieve this. Beirut was also the only port in the region which had so far remained under Ottoman rule.

Kozhukhov appeared with his squadron of at least 222 guns off Beirut's coast on July 6, carrying a force of 1,200 Albanian mercenaries and mobile artillery units. Zahir had already negotiated an alliance with Shihab, when the latter was denied assistance by the Pasha of Damascus against Jazzar. During the month-long negotiations that followed, the Druze emir managed to persuade Kozhukhov, through Zahir and his uncle Amir Musa Mansur, to deliver Beirut to him. Shihab was to pay a tribute of 300,000 qirsh and place the town under Russian protection. On his part, Kozhukhov promised that his troops would not pillage the town as the Russian occupiers of 1772 had. Both sides agreed that the Russians would hold Mansur as a hostage, pending full payment by Shihab.

=== Greek War of Independence ===
On March 18, 1826, a flotilla of around fifteen Greek ships led by Vasos Mavrovouniotis attempted to spread the Greek Revolution to the Ottoman Levant. According to then-British Consul John Barker, stationed in Aleppo, in a memo to British Ambassador Stratford Canning, in Constantinople. The Greek Revolutionaries landed in Beirut, but were thwarted by a local Mufti and a hastily arranged defense force. Although initially repelled, the Greeks did manage to hold on to a small portion of the city near the seashore in an area inhabited by local Rûm. During which they appealed to the Rûm "to rise up and join them", and even sent an invitation to the chief of the local Druzes to also join the Revolution. A few days later, on March 23, 1826, the regional governor Abdullah Pasha sent his lieutenant and nearly 500 Albanian irregular forces to exact revenge for the failed uprising.

=== Vilayet of Beirut ===
In 1888, Beirut was made capital of a vilayet (governorate) in Syria, including the sanjaks (prefectures) Latakia, Tripoli, Beirut, Acre and Bekaa. By this time, Beirut had grown into a cosmopolitan city and had close links with Europe and the United States. It also became a centre of missionary activity that spawned educational institutions such as the American University of Beirut. Provided with water from a British company and gas from a French one, silk exports to Europe came to dominate the local economy. After French engineers established a modern harbour in 1894 and a rail link across Lebanon to Damascus and Aleppo in 1907, much of the trade was carried by French ships to Marseille. French influence in the area soon exceeded that of any other European power. The 1911 Encyclopædia Britannica reported a population consisting of 36,000 Muslims, 77,000 Christians, 2,500 Jews, 400 Druze and 4,100 foreigners. At the start of the 20th century, Salim Ali Salam was one of the most prominent figures in Beirut, holding numerous public positions including deputy from Beirut to the Ottoman parliament and President of the Municipality of Beirut. Given his modern way of life, the emergence of Salim Ali Salam as a public figure constituted a transformation in terms of the social development of the city.

An aerial panoramic view of Beirut in the last third of the 19th century

In his 2003 book entitled Beirut and its Seven Families, Dr. Yussef Bin Ahmad Bin Ali Al Husseini says:

The seven families of Beirut are the families who bonded among each other and made the famous historical agreement with the governor of the Syrian Coast in 1351 to protect and defend the city of Beirut and its shores, and chase the invaders and stop their progress towards it.

Recent research shows that Beirut’s leading merchant dynasties, the Sursuq, Bustrus, Tueini, Trad and Najjar families, turned themselves into kin‑run joint‑stock companies that first dominated the Mount Lebanon silk trade and then bought some 220,000 dunums of estates from Acre to the Esdraelon Plain (both located in modern-day Israel). Operating through branch offices in Marseille, Liverpool and Alexandria, they were able to crash the Paris Bourse with a single five‑million‑franc speculation in Egyptian stocks in 1898. They also persuaded the Rothschild Bank in London to rewrite loan contracts so that Ottoman inheritance law would apply. These activities, historian Kristen Alff states, made Beirut capital an active force in reshaping nineteenth‑century Mediterranean finance and property relations rather than a recipient of 'Western' capitalism.

=== Mount Lebanon famine ===
The Ottoman Empire joined the Central Powers in World War I on 28 October 1914. The Ottoman government had appropriated all of the empire's railway services for military use, which disrupted the procurement of crops to parts of the empire. One of the first cities to be hit by the grain shortage was Beirut.

On 13 November 1914, only 2 weeks after the Ottoman Empire joined the war, a group of citizens stormed the Beirut municipality to warn the municipal council of the severe shortage of wheat and flour in the city. The train freight cars that regularly transported grains from Aleppo had not arrived and the bakery shelves were empty. Angry mobs looted the bakeries of whatever little reserves of flour and grain they had left. The municipal council dispatched a message to then Beirut Vali Bekir Sami Kunduh who requested grain provisions from the governor of Aleppo Vilayet and urged the Ottoman authorities to prioritize grain shipping to Beirut. Acquiring train freight cars to transport anything to the Beirut Vilayet was impossible without paying large bribes to military commanders and to the railroad authorities. Grain prices began to soar, which prompted the president of Beirut's municipal body, Ahmad Mukhtar Beyhum, to address the grain supply bottlenecks himself.

On 14 November 1914, Beyhum took off to Aleppo, where he negotiated with authorities, securing grain freight cars from the Ottoman Fourth Army. The wheat was paid for from the municipal treasury. Grain freights arrived to Beirut on 19 November 1914 to the relief of the masses; however, the crisis was to worsen as both reports of the Ottoman officials and correspondence from the Syrian Protestant College indicated that food shortages were to become a daily occurrence past November.

== Republic of Lebanon ==
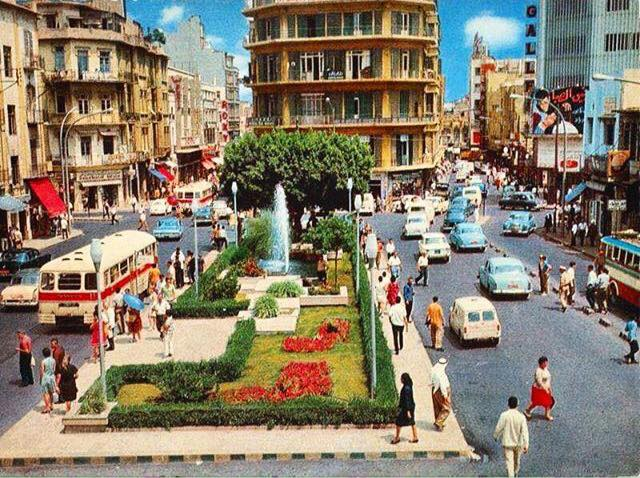
Debbas Square in Beirut, 1967

After World War I and the collapse of the Ottoman Empire, Beirut, along with the rest of Lebanon, was placed under the French Mandate. Lebanon achieved independence in 1943, and Beirut became the capital city. The city remained a regional intellectual capital, becoming a major tourist destination and a banking haven, especially for the Persian Gulf oil boom. The Beirut International Airport was opened on 23 April 1954, replacing the much smaller Bir Hassan Airfield which was located a short distance north. At the time of its opening, the terminal was very modern and it featured an excellent spotters terrace with a café.

In the aftermath of the 1948 Arab–Israeli War, Lebanon became home to more than 110,000 Palestinian refugees.

=== World War II ===
The Battle of Beirut took place on 12 July 1941 marked the end of hostilities in the Syria-Lebanon campaign of World War II.

The campaign saw the initial Allied deployment of 2 brigades of the Australian 7th Division, a brigade from the 1st British Cavalry Division, the 5th Indian Infantry Brigade which was deployed immediately from Eritrea after the surrender of the Duke of Aosta, several armoured and air units of the British 6th Division, a special commando force (C battalion of the Special Service Brigade) and 6 battalions of the 1st Free French Division.

On 8 July, even before the fall of Damour, the Vichy French commander—General Henri Dentz—had sought an armistice: the advance on Beirut together with the Allied capture of Damascus in late June and the rapid advance of Allied troops into Syria from Iraq in early July to capture Deir ez Zor and then push on towards Aleppo had made the Vichy position untenable. At one minute past midnight on 12 July, a ceasefire came into effect. For all intents and purposes, this ended the campaign and an armistice was signed on 14 July at the "Sidney Smith Barracks" on the outskirts of the city of Acre. The armistice placed Syria under the French general Charles de Gaulle.

The triumphant entry of the Australian 7th Division into Beirut successfully established the Allied occupation of Lebanon. Beirut later became an important Allied base for Mediterranean naval operations.

=== 1958 crisis ===
Camille Chamoun was elected as the second President of Lebanon in the presidential elections in 1952, replacing Bechara El Khoury in the post. Described as "quite openly anti-Communist", the United States viewed Chamoun as "definitely our friend." In 1957, shortly after the announcement of the Eisenhower Doctrine—which Chamoun's regime had been the only Arab government to openly endorse "without reservation"—the United States became concerned that parliamentary elections set for June would result in the election of a parliament that was hostile to the US. Many Muslims in the nation supported Nasser and the United Arab Republic (UAR). Kamal Jumblatt and Rashid Karami, Druze and Sunni leaders, respectively, condemned Chamoun's support for the doctrine as violating the National Pact. US attempts to influence the election included approving the sending of $12.7 million in military or financial aid and sending operatives from the Central Intelligence Agency (including David Atlee Phillips, Miles Copeland Jr. and Wilbur Eveland) to the region, who provided "campaign contributions" towards pro-West politicians. In late May 1957 pro-Chamoun troops killed seven and wounded seventy-three protesters in Beirut and the following month opposition leaders argued that Chamoun "had bought so many votes and gerrymandered so many districts that the balloting would be meaningless." The election was an American success, as fifty-three out of sixty-six parliamentarians supported Chamoun. The US continued to provide aid to Chamoun, fearing Soviet and UAR influence in the region. Chamun's opponents maintained that the election was invalid and needed to be re-held.

On 8 May 1958 a Lebanese journalist, Nasib Al Matni, was assassinated in his office in Beirut. He was a pro-Nasserist and anti-Chamoun Maronite. Following this incident intensive protests occurred in Beirut and Tripoli.

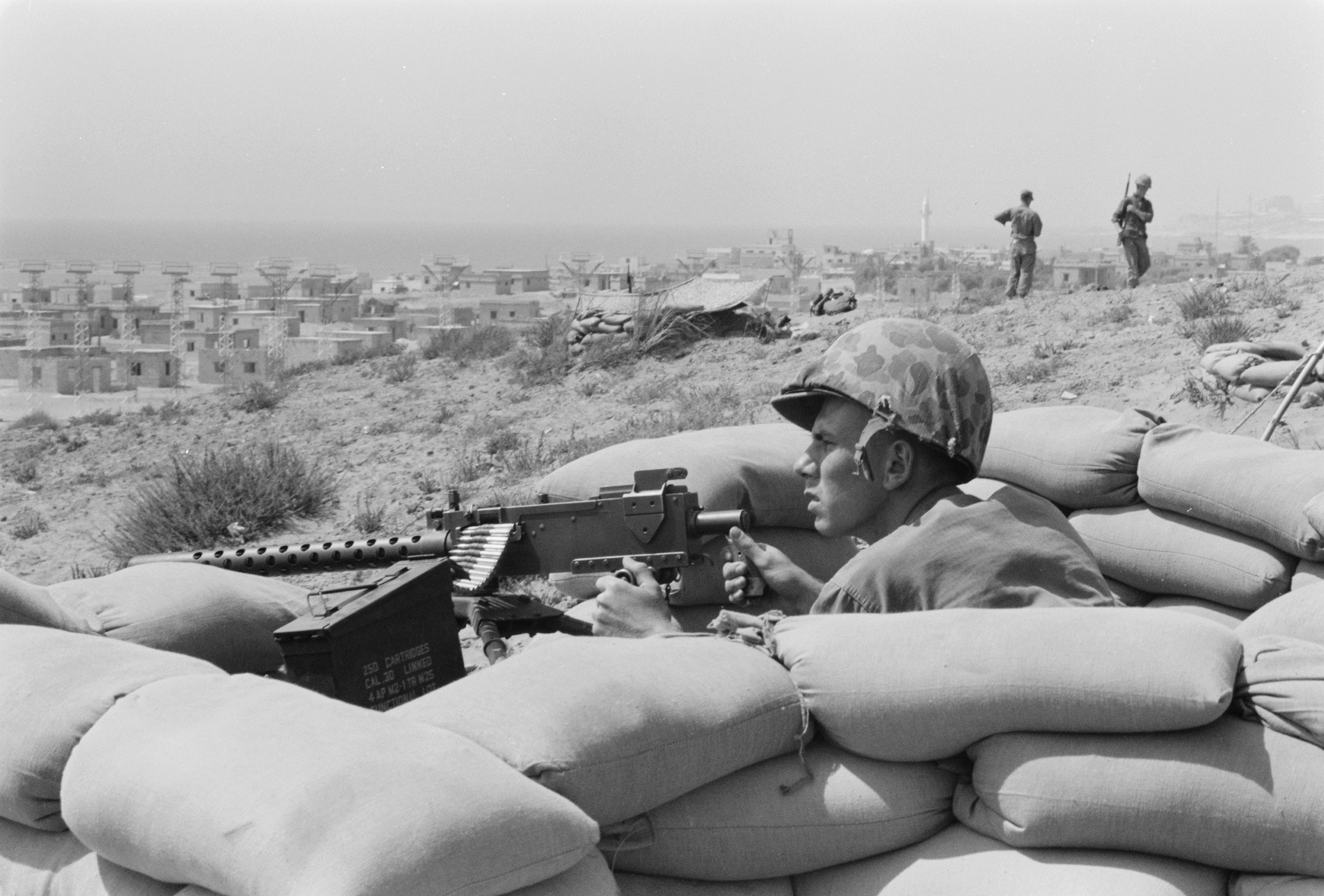
U.S. Marine in a foxhole, Beirut 1958

On February 1, 1958, Syria and Egypt united, forming the UAR. The United States feared initially that the new nation would become the dominant power in the Middle East, but recognized it on February 25 after deciding that the UAR could be beneficial in halting communism's spread and keeping Nasser contained. Chamoun and Charles Malik worried that “the peril of subversion in Lebanon" by the UAR "was immediate” and asked for American aid.

Protests by various groups—mainly the Sunnis and the Druze—began in February against the Christian Chamoun, who had also aligned himself in support of the US and Britain, actions that protesters considered breaches of the National Pact. Demonstrations also protested that Chamoun had not allowed Lebanon to join the UAR. The protesters felt that "Chamoun was not willing to modify his foreign policy unless he was forced to." Tensions between Maronite Christians and Arab Muslims continued to rise after the killing of Nasib Al Matni on 8 May. Metni was the editor of Al Telegraf and had been critical of Chamoun's rule. Fighting erupted on the streets of Beirut as a Muslim mob burned the US Information Service library down. Heightened tensions existed around the country, including in the Beqaa Valley, where Shia militants were receiving weapons from Syria.

Eisenhower responded by authorizing Operation Blue Bat on July 15, 1958, in the first application of the Eisenhower Doctrine in which the US announced that it would intervene to protect regimes that it considered to be threatened by international communism. The goal of the operation was to bolster Chamoun's pro-Western Lebanese government from internal opposition and threats from Syria and Egypt. The plan was to occupy and secure Beirut International Airport, a few miles south of the city, and then to secure the port of Beirut and the approaches to the city. The operation involved more than 14,000 men, including 8,509 US Army personnel, a contingent from the 1st Airborne Battle Group, 187th Infantry from the 24th Infantry Division and 5,670 officers and men of the United States Marine Corps (the 2nd Provisional Marine Force, of Battalion Landing Teams 1st Battalion, 8th Marines and 2nd Battalion, 2nd Marines under Brigadier General Sidney S. Wade). The 2nd Battalion, 8th Marines arrived on July 16 after a 54-hour airlift from Cherry Point, North Carolina They were supported by a fleet of 70 ships and 40,000 sailors. On July 16, 1958, Admiral James L. Holloway Jr., CINCNELM and CINCSPECCOMME, flew in from London to Beirut airport and boarded USS Taconic from which he commanded the remainder of the operation. The U.S. withdrew its forces on October 25, 1958.

Lebanese Prime Minister Rashid Karami formed a national reconciliation government after the end of the 1958 crisis.

=== Lebanese Civil War ===
This era of relative prosperity ended in 1975 when the Lebanese Civil War broke out throughout the country, During most of the war, Beirut was divided between the Muslim west part and the Christian east. The downtown area, previously the home of much of the city's commercial and cultural activity, became a no man's land known as the Green Line. Many inhabitants fled to other countries. About 60,000 people died in the first two years of the war (1975–1976), and much of the city was devastated.

==== First phase 1975–1977 ====
Throughout the spring of 1975, minor clashes in Lebanon had been building up towards all-out conflict, with the Lebanese National Movement (LNM) pitted against the Phalange, and the ever-weaker national government wavering between the need to maintain order and cater to its constituency. On the morning of 13 April 1975, unidentified gunmen in a speeding car fired on a church in the Christian East Beirut suburb of Ain el-Rummaneh, killing four people, including two Maronite Phalangists. Hours later, Phalangists led by the Gemayels killed 30 Palestinians traveling in Ain el-Rummaneh. Citywide clashes erupted in response to this "Bus Massacre". The Battle of the Hotels began in October 1975, and lasted until March in 1976.

On 6 December 1975, a day later known as Black Saturday, the killings of four Phalange members led Phalange to quickly and temporarily set up roadblocks throughout Beirut at which identification cards were inspected for religious affiliation. Many Palestinians or Lebanese Muslims passing through the roadblocks were killed immediately. Additionally, Phalange members took hostages and attacked Muslims in East Beirut. Muslim and Palestinian militias retaliated with force, increasing the total death count to between 200 and 600 civilians and militiamen. After this point, all-out fighting began between the militias.

The nation was now effectively divided, with southern Lebanon and the western half of Beirut becoming bases for the PLO and Muslim-based militias, and the Christians in control of East Beirut and the Christian section of Mount Lebanon. The main confrontation line in divided Beirut was known as the Green Line.

In East Beirut, in 1976, Maronite leaders of the National Liberal Party (NLP), the Kataeb Party and the Lebanese Renewal Party joined in the Lebanese Front, a political counterpoint to the LNM. Their militias – the Tigers, Kataeb Regulatory Forces (KRF) and Guardians of the Cedars – entered a loose coalition known as the Lebanese Forces, to form a military wing for the Lebanese Front. From the very beginning, the Kataeb and its Regulatory Forces' militia, under the leadership of Bashir Gemayel, dominated the LF. In 1977–80, through absorbing or destroying smaller militias, he both consolidated control and strengthened the LF into the dominant Maronite force.

==== Second phase 1977–1982 ====
A particularly destructive period was the 1978 Syrian siege of Achrafiyeh, the main Christian district of Beirut. Syrian troops relentlessly shelled the eastern quarter of the city, but Christian militias defeated multiple attempts by Syria's elite forces to capture the strategic area in a three-month campaign later known as the Hundred Days' War.

In Beirut sniper fire across the Green Line between East and West Beirut increased, climaxing in April with lengthy artillery exchanges. The main combatants were elements of the Lebanese Army and the Syrian ADF.

==== Third phase 1982–1984 ====
A car bomb exploded inside the French embassy compound in Beirut on the morning of 24 May 1982. It killed ten Lebanese people and two French people; it wounded 27 other people.

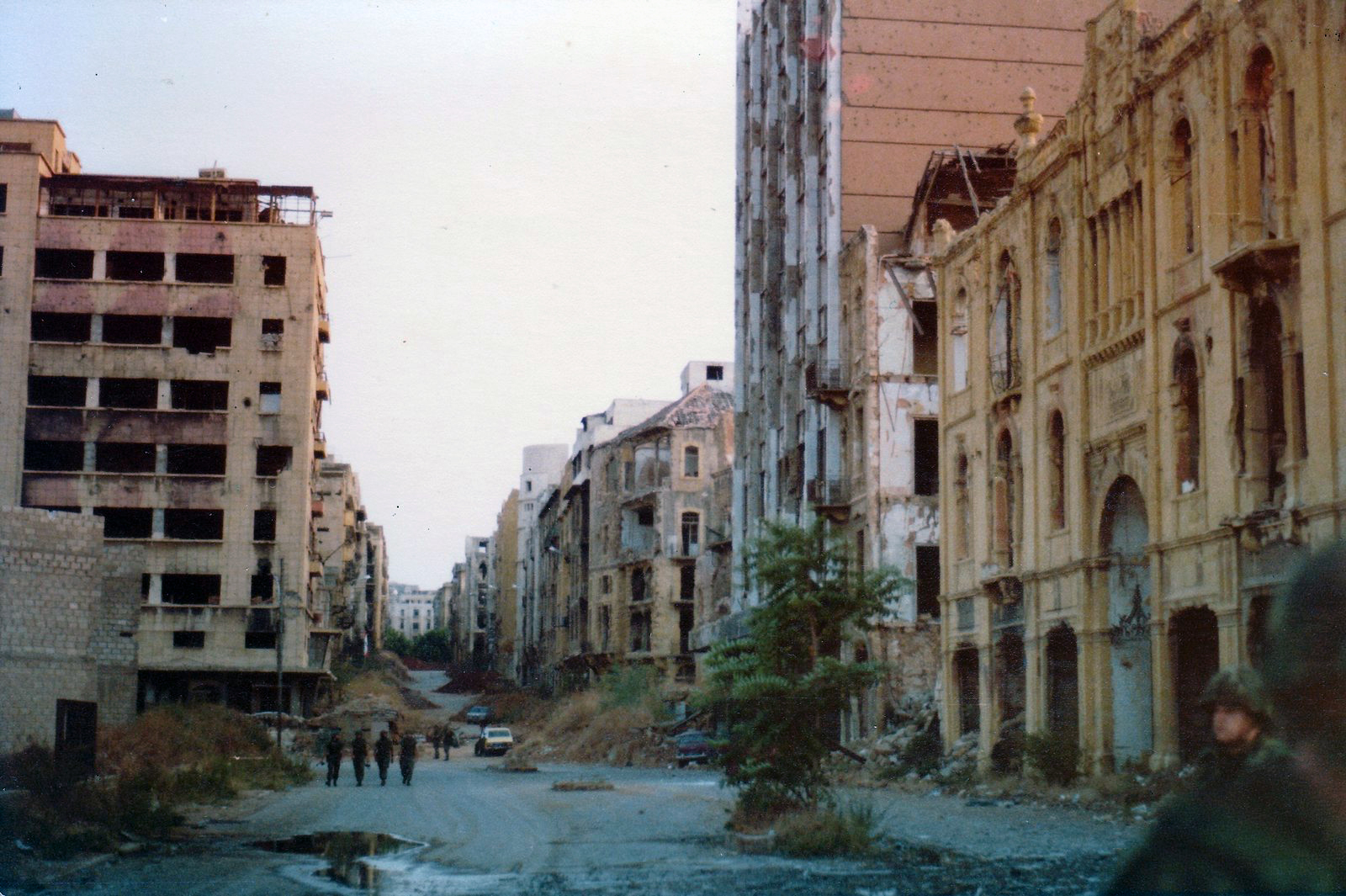
Green Line, Beirut, 1982

Israel launched Operation Peace for Galilee on 6 June 1982, attacking PLO bases in Lebanon. Israeli forces quickly drove 25 miles (40 km) into Lebanon, moving into East Beirut with the tacit support of Maronite leaders and militia. When the Israeli cabinet convened to authorize the invasion, Sharon described it as a plan to advance 40 kilometers into Lebanon, demolish PLO strongholds, and establish an expanded security zone that would put northern Israel out of range of PLO rockets. Israeli chief of staff Rafael Eitan and Sharon had already ordered the invading forces to head straight for Beirut, in accord with Sharon's plan from September 1981. The UN Security Council passed a further resolution on 6 June 1982, United Nations Security Council Resolution 509 demanding that Israel withdraw to the internationally recognized boundaries of Lebanon. On 8 June 1982, the United States vetoed a proposed resolution demanding that Israel withdraw. By 15 June 1982, Israeli units were entrenched outside Beirut. The United States called for PLO withdrawal from Lebanon, and Sharon began to order bombing raids of West Beirut, targeting some 16,000 PLO fedayeen who had retreated into fortified positions. Meanwhile, Arafat attempted through negotiations to salvage politically what was clearly a disaster for the PLO, an attempt which eventually succeeded once the multinational force arrived to evacuate the PLO.

On 14 September 1982, president-elect and Lebanese Forces leader Bashir Gemayel was assassinated after a bomb exploded during a meeting in the Kataeb headquarters.

On 16–18 September 1982, Lebanese Phalangists (allied with the Israeli Defense Force) killed between 460 and 3,500 Palestinian and Lebanese civilians in the Shatila refugee camp and the adjacent Sabra neighborhood of Beirut. The Israelis had ordered their Phalangist allies to clear out PLO fighters. Soldiers loyal to Phalangist leader Elie Hobeika began slaughtering civilians while Israeli forces blocked exits from Sabra and Shatila and illuminated the area with flares. IDF officials not only failed to act to stop the killings, but also prevented the escapees from fleeing the Phalangists and aided them later by lighting the camps during night at their request.

Ten days later, the Israeli government set up the Kahan Commission to investigate the circumstances of the Sabra and Shatila massacre. In 1983, the commission published its findings that then-Defense Minister Ariel Sharon was personally responsible for the massacre and should resign. Under pressure, Sharon resigned as defense minister but remained in the government as a minister without portfolio.

On 18 April 1983, a suicide bombing attack at the U.S. Embassy in West Beirut killed 63, beginning a series of attacks against U.S. and Western interests in Lebanon.

On 23 October 1983, a devastating Iranian-sponsored suicide bombing targeted the barracks of U.S. and French forces in Beirut, killing 241 American and 58 French servicemen. On 18 January 1984, American University of Beirut President Malcolm H. Kerr was murdered.

==== Fourth phase 1984–1990 ====
The February 6 uprising in West Beirut or the February 6 Intifada, was a battle where the parties of West Beirut, led by the Amal Movement, decisively defeated the Lebanese Army. The day started with the defection of many Muslim and Druze units to militias, which as a major blow to the government and caused the army to virtually collapse.

On 8 August 1985 a summit was held in Damascus with President Amin Gemayel, Prime Minister Rachid Karami and Syrian President Hafez al-Assad attempting to end the fighting between Christian and Druze militias. There followed a series of car bombs in Beirut which were seen as intended to thwart any agreement. On 14 August a car exploded in a Christian district control by the Lebanese Forces. On 17 August another exploded beside a supermarket, also in a district under LF control. 55 people were killed. Two days later 2 car bombs went off in a Druze and a Shi'ite district of Beirut. The following day another car bomb exploded in Tripoli. An unknown group, the "Black Brigades", claimed responsibility. The violence quickly escalated with extensive artillery exchanges. It is estimated that in two weeks 300 people were killed. On 15 September fighting broke out in Tripoli between Alawite and Sunni militias. 200,000 people fled the city. The harbour district was heavily bombarded. The arrival of the Syrian army a week later ended the violence which left 500 killed.

Major combat returned to Beirut in 1987, when Palestinians, leftists, and Druze fighters allied against Amal, eventually drawing further Syrian intervention. On 22 February 1987 eight thousand Syrian soldiers entered West Beirut to separate the rival militias. In the Shia district twenty-three men and four women were taken from a place of worship and shot and bayoneted to death. A crowd of fifty thousand attended their funeral with calls for revenge. Ayatollah Khomeini issued a fatwa forbidding attacks on Syrian forces.

Between 1989 and 1990 parts on East Beirut were destroyed in fighting between army units loyal to General Aoun and Samir Geagea's Lebanese Forces. On 8 March 1989 Aoun started the blockade of illegal ports of Muslim militias, and this touched off bloody exchanges of artillery fire that lasted for half a year. Six days later he launched what he termed a "war of liberation" against the Syrians and their Lebanese militia allies. As a result, Syrian pressure on his Lebanese Army and militia pockets in East Beirut grew. Still, Aoun persisted in the "war of liberation", denouncing the government of Hafez al-Assad and claiming that he fought for Lebanon's independence. While he seems to have had significant Maronite support for this, he was still perceived as a sectarian leader among others by the Muslim population, who distrusted his agenda. He was also plagued by the challenge to his legitimacy put forth by the Syrian-backed West Beirut government of Selim al-Hoss. Militarily, this war did not achieve its goal, and instead caused considerable damage to East Beirut and provoked massive emigration among the Christian population.

== Second Lebanese Republic ==
Since the end of the war in 1990, the people of Lebanon have been rebuilding Beirut, whose urban agglomeration was mainly constituted during war time through an anarchic urban development stretching along the littoral corridor and its nearby heights. By the start of the 2006 Israel-Lebanon conflict the city had somewhat regained its status as a tourist, cultural and intellectual centre in the Middle East and as a center for commerce, fashion, and media. The reconstruction of downtown Beirut has been largely driven by Solidere, a development company established in 1994 by Prime Minister Rafic Hariri. The city has hosted both the Asian Club Basketball Championship and the Asian Football Cup, and has hosted the Miss Europe pageant nine times: 1960–1964, 1999, 2001–2002, and 2016.

=== Strings of assassinations and subsequent revolution ===
==== Assassination of Rafic Hariri ====
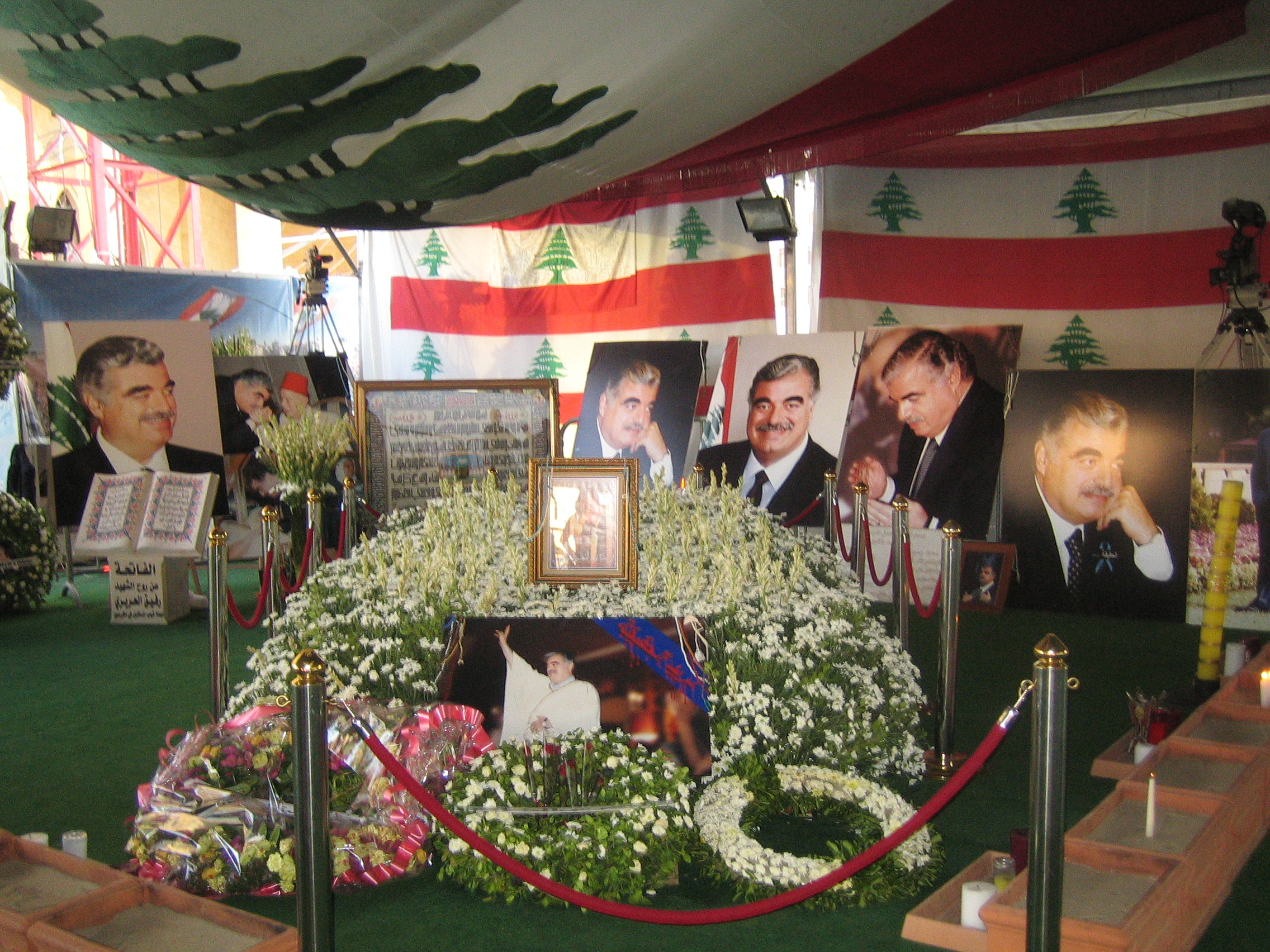
Rafic Hariri memorial shrine

A massive explosion on 14 February 2005, killed Lebanese Prime Minister Rafiq Hariri in Beirut, near the St. George Hotel. Also killed was the former Minister of the Economy, Bassel Fleihan, and 19 other people. About 220 others were wounded.

A group calling itself "The Nasra & Jihad Group in Greater Syria" claimed responsibility for the blast. The group had not been heard from before. A tape aired by Al Jazeera showed a bearded man, believed to be a Palestinian named Ahmad Abu Adas, claiming the attack. Adas' apartment was raided but he remains missing; however, it is now thought he was forced to admit to the plot and was killed by those who planned the assassination.

According to the United Nations report by Detlev Mehlis, released 20 October 2005, the blast was the result of a truck bomb. A security camera captured a white Mitsubishi truck driving near Hariri's convoy moments before the blast; investigators determined this truck carried the explosives, estimated at 1,000 kg. Since Hariri's convoy had jamming devices meant to block remote control signals, the attack was carried out using a suicide bomber. The report cited a witness who said the bomber was an Iraqi who was led to believe his target was Iraqi Prime Minister Iyad Allawi, who had been in Beirut just days before.

==== Cedar Revolution ====
A month later about one million people gathered for an opposition rally in Beirut. The Cedar Revolution was the largest rally in Lebanon's history at that time. The last Syrian troops withdrew from Beirut on 26 April 2005, and the two countries established diplomatic relations on 15 October 2008.

==== Further assassinations ====
Anti-Syrian journalist Samir Kassir was assassinated on 2 June, 2005 when a bomb detonated in his car outside his home in Beirut's Ashrafiyeh district, a largely Christian residential area. Kassir was a front-page columnist for the An Nahar newspaper, where he wrote columns criticizing the pro-Syrian government. George Hawi, former Lebanese Communist Party leader and a critic of Israel and Syria, died when his car exploded as he was driving through Beirut's Wata Musaitbi district on 21 June. A prominent anti-Syrian journalist and lawmaker, Gebran Tueni, was killed by a car bomb on 12 December. He had returned from France only a day earlier, where he had been staying for fear of assassination. Two other people were killed – his driver and a passerby – when a car bomb exploded as his motorcade drove through Mkalles, an industrial suburb of Beirut. Another 30 people were wounded in the bombing, and at least 10 vehicles were destroyed. On 28 December 2005, Lebanese newspaper An Nahar reported it had received a statement signed by "The Strugglers for the Unity and Freedom in al-Sham," the group that claimed responsibility for the death of its former editor Gibran Tueni with a car bomb on 12 December. The statement said outgoing UNIIIC chairman Mehlis was lucky to escape death and threatened any new chairman with assassination if he too implicated Syria.

=== 2006 war ===
During the 2006 Lebanon War, Israeli bombardment caused damage in many parts of Beirut, especially the predominantly Shiite southern suburbs of Beirut. On 12 July 2006, the "Operation Truthful Promise" carried out by Hezbollah ended with 8 Israeli deaths and 6 injuries. In response, the IDF targeted Hezbollah's main media outlets. There were then artillery raids against targets in southern Lebanon, and the Israeli cabinet held Beirut responsible for the attacks. Then on 13 July 2006 Israel began implementing a naval and air blockade over Lebanon; during this blockade Israel bombed the runways at Beirut International Airport and the major Beirut-Damascus highway in Eastern Lebanon.

=== 2006–08 political protests and further assassinations ===
Hundreds of thousands of demonstrators amassed peacefully in downtown Beirut. Police estimated the crowd to number approximately 800,000, while Hezbollah claimed it was larger. By nighttime, several thousand protesters remained to begin a sit-in, setting up tents and vowing not to leave until Prime Minister Fouad Siniora resigned. Violent clashes between pro-government and anti-government groups flared up in Beirut, stoking fears of a possible civil war. The clashes claimed the life of 21-year-old Amal supporter, Ahmad Ali Mahmoud, and left 21 others injured. Al-Manar, a Hezbollah-run television station, reported that Future Movement militiamen were responsible of Mahmoud's death.

Pierre Amine Gemayel, anti-Syrian MP, son of Kataeb leader Amin Gemayel, nephew of assassinated President Bashir Gemayyel, and Minister of Industry at the time was shot dead in Beirut on 21 November 2006. Walid Eido, another anti-Syrian MP, was killed by a car bomb on 13 June 2007 in Beirut, along with eight others, including his eldest son Khaled Eido.

On January 25, 2007, Sunni and Shiite students clashed violently at the Beirut Arab University, which escalated into civil unrest in parts of Beirut. Four people were killed while over a hundred and fifty were injured. As a result, the Lebanese Armed Forces declared an overnight curfew. According to Hezbollah-owned Al-Manar, the shooting was started by pro-government militiamen.

Wissam Eid who was a computer engineer and a senior terrorism investigator at the Lebanese Internal Security Forces was assassinated on 25 January 2008 in the suburb of Hazmeyeh. At the time of assassination, Eid was also top Lebanese investigator into the assassination of Prime Minister Rafic Hariri. More specifically, he was analysing the telephone intercepts concerning the assassination when he was killed.

=== 2008 clashes ===
In May 2008, after the government decided to disband Hezbollah's communications network (a decision it later rescinded), violent clashes broke out briefly between government allies and opposition forces, before control of the city was handed over to the Lebanese Army. After this a national dialogue conference was held in Doha at the invitation of the Prince of Qatar. The conference agreed to appoint a new president of Lebanon and to establish a new national government involving all the political adversaries. As a result of the Doha Agreement, the opposition's barricades were dismantled and so were the opposition's protest camps in Martyrs' Square. On 19 October 2012, a car bomb killed eight people in the Beirut's neighborhood of Achrafiyeh, including Brigadier General Wissam al-Hassan, chief of the Intelligence Bureau of the Internal Security Forces. In addition, 78 others were wounded in the bombing. It was the largest attack in the capital since 2008. On 27 December 2013, a car bomb exploded in the Central District killing at least five people, including the former Lebanese ambassador to the U.S. Mohamad Chatah, and wounding 71 others.

=== Syrian Civil War spillover and jihadist insurgency ===
Wissam al-Hassan, was assassinated on 19 October 2012 in a car bomb that was located in Achrafieh district of Beirut. He was killed along with two citizens, while a hundred and twenty others were injured. Wissam al-Hassan was the head of the information branch of Lebanon's Internal Security Forces and one of the country's key security officials. His death comes a few months after he investigated ex-Information Minister Michel Samaha, who was charged with smuggling bombs from Syria with the help of Syrian Security Chief Ali Mamlouk, in order to launch a series of terrorist attacks in Lebanon.

On 9 July 2013 the southern suburb of Beirut, Bir el-Abed was hit by a car bomb. The bombing injured at least 53 people, as it was close to a supermarket which was heavily packed in preparation for Ramadan, but did not claim any lives. The bombing increased fear amongst the Lebanese people that the war in Syria was close to entering Lebanese territory. This bombing took place in the heart of Lebanon's Hezbollah militant group's primary location. The 313 Brigade of Special Forces of the Free Syrian Army claimed responsibility for the attack.

On 15 August 2013, a car bomb exploded in Beirut killing 27 people and injuring over 200 people. The car bomb was intended for the stronghold of Hezbollah. It was reportedly the "worst explosion in south Beirut" since a 1985 truck bomb assassination attempt targeting top Shiite cleric Mohammed Hussein Fadlallah. The Islamist group Aisha Umm-al Mouemeneen, also known as Brigades of Aisha, were responsible for the explosion.

On 27 December 2013, Mohamad Chatah, a former Finance Minister of Lebanon was killed in a car bombing in Beirut. Seven others were also killed.

In the 12 November 2015 Beirut bombings, two suicide bombers detonated explosives outside a mosque and inside a bakery, killing 43 people and injuring 200. The Islamic State of Iraq and the Levant immediately claimed responsibility for the attacks.

=== You Stink! protests ===
A series of protests took place between 2015 and 2016 in response to the government's failure to find solutions to a waste crisis caused by the closure of the Beirut and Mount Lebanon region waste dump in Naameh (south of Beirut) in July 2015. The closure led the region's waste company Sukleen to suspend collection causing piles of rubbish to fill the streets. A series of small but increasing protests, led by grassroots organization "You Stink!," were held throughout the summer, culminating in large protests in August. These attracted thousands of demonstrators but also saw scuffles with police. The protest were categorized by comical slogans and imaginative chants which mostly linked political figures to the crisis. However, protesters were reported shouting a number of chants made popular during the Arab Spring uprisings across the region, including "Ash-shab yurid isqat an-nizam" (meaning "The people want to topple the regime"). The protests spawned the political campaign Beirut Madinati.

Lebanese army units were deployed in central Beirut after the demonstration degenerated in street fighting between protesters and law enforcement. The Lebanese Red Cross said it treated 402 people in Sunday's protest. About 40 people were taken to hospital. Ambulances ferried out casualties after security forces fired tear gas, rubber bullets and water cannon at demonstrators protesting against what they call Lebanon's "political dysfunction". About 200 youths, some wearing scarves or masks to cover their faces, threw stones and bottles filled with sand at police and tried to pull down security barricades. The protest, organized by an online group "You Stink!" along with other civil society groups, attracted an estimated 20000 people on the streets of Riad El Solh Square in central Beirut.

=== Liquidity crisis and Revolution ===
In October 2019 a series of country-wide protests began in response to many of the government's failures and malfeasances. In the months leading up to the protests there was an ever deepening foreign reserves liquidity crisis.

Concurrently with the COVID-19 pandemic, the Banque du Liban (BdL) in March 2020 defaulted on $90 billion of sovereign debt obligations, triggering a collapse in the value of the Lebanese pound. The decision was taken unanimously at a cabinet meeting under the chairmanship of Hassan Diab on 7 March. That in turn caused the complex and opaque financial engineering with which the BdL maintained the nation's tenuous stability to crash and burn. Simultaneously, commercial banks imposed "informal capital controls limiting the amount of dollars depositors can withdraw as well as transfers abroad." Capital controls were expected to remain in place until at least 2025. It was remarked at the time that Lebanon, whose population is under 7 million, "produces little and imports about 80 percent of the goods it consumes." Debt servicing had consumed 30 percent of recent budgets.

=== Port explosion ===
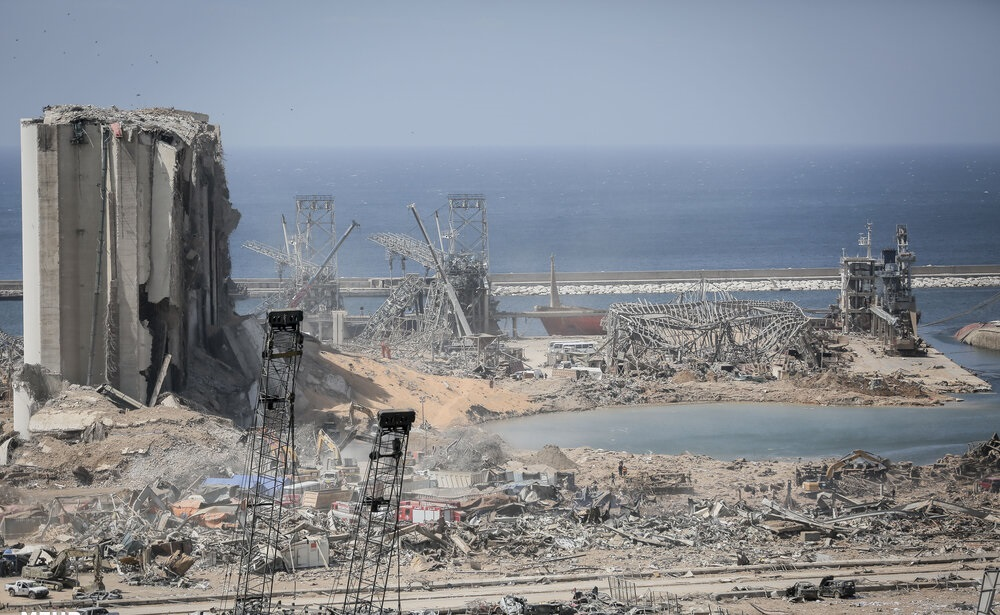
Aftermath of the explosion in the port

On 4 August 2020, the Beirut explosion occurred in the port sector of the city, destroying hectares of buildings and killing over 200 people. It was felt throughout the country. 4 days later on 8 August, a peaceful protest was organized starting from the port of Beirut and destined for the parliament building. The demonstrators were faced with brutal, deadly, and extreme excessive force including the use of live-ammunition by the security apparatus to oppress and subdue demonstrators. 728 demonstrators were injured during the 8 August protests and at least 153 injuries were severe enough to be treated in surrounding hospitals. Amid much popular unrest, the entire cabinet of Hassan Diab resigned on 10 August, and a state of emergency, which gave "the army broad powers to prevent gatherings, censor media and arrest anyone deemed to be a security threat", was declared on 13 August by the caretaker government. On 14 August, Hezbollah leader Hassan Nasrallah "referred to the possibility of civil war" were the anti-government protestors to force an early election. Meanwhile, Iranian foreign minister Javad Zarif complained about the presence of "French and British warships that were deployed to assist in the delivery of medical assistance and other aid." Also on 14 August, the United Nations Office for the Coordination of Humanitarian Affairs (UNOCHA) launched a $565 million appeal for donors of aid to victims of the explosion. The UN effort was to focus on: meals, first aid, shelters, and repair of schools.

==== Tayouneh clashes ====
On 14 October 2021, protests were held in the Tayouneh neighborhood of Beirut by supporters of Hezbollah and the Amal Movement; several of the demonstrators were armed. They were calling for the removal of Tarek Bitar, the judge appointed to investigate the Beirut port explosion. At one point, the demonstrators were shot at by snipers from nearby buildings, though the latter's identity was unclear. The attackers even used rocket-propelled grenades, and also attacked Lebanese Armed Forces soldiers. Hezbollah claimed the snipers were Lebanese Forces supporters, though this is unconfirmed. Later on, a video surfaced showing a Lebanese Army soldier shooting at the demonstrators.

Fighting consequently erupted in Beirut, as Hezbollah militants shot assault rifles and rocket-propelled grenades, including at the buildings where the snipers were allegedly located. Four projectiles fell near a private French school, Freres of Furn el Chebbak, causing a panic. The Lebanese Army was one of the first to evacuate people from the area. Lebanese Armed Forces patrols, including special forces, tried to restore order; doing so, they clashed with gunmen and used live ammunition.

Hezbollah-affiliated activists have claimed, but not verified, that one of the snipers was Shukri Abu Saab, an employee of the US embassy in Beirut. A Syrian national was among those arrested and detained in connection with the sniper and militant attacks. At least seven people were killed overall in the incident. The Amal Movement and Hezbollah lost three dead militants each; one of the Hezbollah casualties was a participant in the Syrian Civil War. In addition, a woman was killed inside her home. Overall, 32 people were injured. The clash only escalated fears of an imminent collapse of Lebanon and a return to the days of the Lebanese Civil War. The Lebanese Army consequently raided several locations in Beirut, arresting nine individuals connected to the parties involved in the clash. President Michel Aoun vowed to "bring the perpetrators to justice".
