= Thoria gens =

Ancient Roman family

The gens Thoria was a minor plebeian family at ancient Rome. Only a few members of this gens are mentioned in history, but a number are known from inscriptions.

== Origin ==
The nomen Thorius may be derived from the Latin torus, in this instance referring to a muscle, and indicating someone brawny. Chase lists the nomen among those that either originated at Rome, or which cannot be shown to have come from anywhere else. The name is sometimes confused with that of Thoranius.

== Praenomina ==
The main praenomina of the Thorii were Lucius and Marcus, which they supplemented as needed with other common names, including Aulus, Gaius, Publius, Sextus, and Titus. Spurius, borne by the earliest of the Thorii mentioned in history, may once have been a regular praenomen of this gens, but it was falling out of general use by this period, and does not appear among the later Thorii.

== Branches and cognomina ==
The only distinct family of the Thorii under the Republic bore the cognomen Balbus. This surname belongs to a large class of cognomina originally derived from the characteristics of the bearer, and indicated a person given to stammering.

== Members ==
This list includes abbreviated praenomina. For an explanation of this practice, see filiation.

- Spurius Thorius Balbus, tribune of the plebs, circa 111 BC, was an orator of some skill, and was the author of the lex Thoria, an agrarian law concerning public land in Italy.
- Lucius Thorius Balbus, legate of Quintus Caecilius Metellus Pius in Spain in 79 BC, he was defeated and killed by Sertorius. Plutarch calls him "Thoranius".
- Gaius Thorius Balbus, a resident of Lanuvium in Latium, was said by Cicero to have enjoyed every manner of pleasure.
- Marcus Thorius M. l. Nestor, a freedman named in an inscription from Caere in Etruria, dating from 39 BC.
- Publius Thorius Ɔ. l. Philota, dedicated a tomb at Rome, dating from the third quarter of the first century BC, for his freedman, Sertomarus, out of the legacy left for him.
- Lucius Thorius Sex. f. Tappo, buried at Populonia in Etruria, in a tomb dating to the third quarter of the first century BC.
- Titus Thorius Felix, made an offering to Belenus at Aquileia in Venetia and Histria, dating from the first quarter of the first century.
- Thoria A. f., the grandmother of Lucius Albius Rufus, buried in a family sepulchre built by her grandson at Lanuvium, dating from the first half of the first century.
- Marcus Thorius M. l. Auctus, a freedman mentioned in an inscription from Ulubrae in Latium, dating from the first half of the first century, was a lanius, or butcher.
- Thoria Gemella, built a tomb at Rome, dating from the first half of the first century, for Publius Alfenus Hypanus.
- Thoria Auge, built a tomb at Puteoli in Campania, dating to the early or middle part of the first century, for Peducaea Hediste, aged thirty-five.
- Aulus Thorius, dedicated a first-century tomb at Rome for Faiania Bassa, aged twenty-one, perhaps his wife.
- Lucius Thorius, buried in a first-century tomb at Patavium in Venetia and Histria, along with Titus Sempronius Auctus and Titus Sempronius Hermes.
- Thoria L. f. Severa, dedicated a sepulchre at Verona in Venetia and Histria, dating from the latter half of the first century, for her husband, Marcus Ennius Primus, and daughter, Baebia Collina.
- Lucius Thorius, buried at Flanona in Dalmatia, in a tomb dating from the first century, or the first half of the second.
- Sextus Thorius Capilo, dedicated a monument at Sidrona in Dalmatia, dating from the first century, or the first half of the second, for his father, Dento.
- Marcus Thorius Valens, made an offering to the local deities at Salona in Dalmatia during the first century, or the first half of the second.
- Sextus Thorius Secundus, built a second-century tomb at Rome for Coelia Eutychia, probably his wife, and their family.

=== Undated Thorii ===
- Thoria, buried at Rome.
- Thorius, named in a sepulchral inscription from Rome.
- Publius Thorius P. l. Anteros, a freedman named in a dedicatory inscription from Rome, along with several other freedmen of the Thoria gens. The inscription may be a forgery.
- Publius Thorius P. Ɔ. l. Antiochus, a freedman named in a dedicatory inscription from Rome, along with several other freedmen of the Thoria gens. The inscription may be a forgery.
- Publius Thorius P. P. l. Eros, a freedman named in a dedicatory inscription from Rome, along with several other freedmen of the Thoria gens. The inscription may be a forgery.
- Lucius Thorius Eutyches, an infant buried at Rome, aged one year, six months, and thirteen days, in a tomb built by his mother, Thoria Primila.
- Lucius Thorius Eutychus, buried at Carpentoracte in Gallia Narbonensis.
- Marcus Thorius M. l. Faustus, a freedman named in a sepulchral inscription from Rome, along with the freedwoman Furia Thais, perhaps his wife.
- Thoria Ingenua, named in an inscription from Carsioli in Sabinum, honoring Gaius Petidius Primio.
- Thoria P. Ɔ. l. Philumina, a freedwoman named in a dedicatory inscription from Rome, along with several freedmen of the Thoria gens. The inscription may be a forgery.
- Thoria Primila, built a tomb at Rome for her infant son, Lucius Thorius Eutyches.
- Publius Thorius P. Ɔ. l. Primus, a freedman named in a dedicatory inscription from Rome, along with several other freedmen of the Thoria gens. The inscription may be a forgery.
- Thoria Rodolppe, dedicated a tomb at Tricastini in Gallia Narbonensis to her brother, Catus Tertullinus.
- Titus Thorius L. f. Rufus, dedicated a tomb at Verona for his wife, the freedwoman Gavia Prima.
- Marcus Thorius Symphorus, buried at Rome, in the family sepulchre of Gaius Julius Lemnus and his wife, Statoria Musarina.
- Marcus Thorius M. l. Syntrophus, a freedman named in a sepulchral inscription from Rome.

== See also ==
- List of Roman gentes

== Bibliography ==
- Marcus Tullius Cicero, Brutus, De Finibus Bonorum et Malorum, De Oratore.
- Lucius Mestrius Plutarchus (Plutarch), Lives of the Noble Greeks and Romans.
- Lucius Annaeus Florus, Epitome de T. Livio Bellorum Omnium Annorum DCC (Epitome of Livy: All the Wars of Seven Hundred Years).
- Appianus Alexandrinus (Appian), Bellum Civile (The Civil War).
- Dictionary of Greek and Roman Biography and Mythology, William Smith, ed., Little, Brown and Company, Boston (1849).
- Theodor Mommsen et alii, Corpus Inscriptionum Latinarum (The Body of Latin Inscriptions, abbreviated CIL), Berlin-Brandenburgische Akademie der Wissenschaften (1853–present).
- Dictionary of Greek and Roman Antiquities, William Smith, ed., Little, Brown, and Company, Boston (1859).
- René Cagnat et alii, L'Année épigraphique (The Year in Epigraphy, abbreviated AE), Presses Universitaires de France (1888–present).
- George Davis Chase, "The Origin of Roman Praenomina", in Harvard Studies in Classical Philology, vol. VIII, pp. 103–184 (1897).
- T. Robert S. Broughton, The Magistrates of the Roman Republic, American Philological Association (1952–1986).
- Giovanni Battista Brusin, Inscriptiones Aquileiae (Inscriptions of Aquileia), Udine (1991–1993).
