= Forum Appii =

Archaeological site in Latina, Italy

The Forum Appii (or Appii Forum) is an ancient post station on the Via Appia, 63.5 km (39.5 imperial miles; 43 Roman miles) southeast of Rome, founded, no doubt, by the original constructor of the road. Horace mentioned it as the usual halt at the end of the first day's journey from Rome, and described it as full of boatmen and cheating innkeepers. Boatmen were found there because it was the starting-point of a canal which ran parallel to the road through the Pontine Marshes, and was used instead of it at the time of Strabo and Horace (see Appian Way).

The Appii Forum and the "Three Taverns" are mentioned also as a halting place in the account of Paul's journey to Rome (Acts xxviii. 15). Under Nerva and Trajan the road was repaired; one inscription records expressly the paving with silex (replacing the former gravelling) of the section from Tripontium, 6 km (4 miles) northwest, to Forum Appii; the bridge near Tripontium was similarly repaired, and that at Forum Appii, though it bears no inscription, is of the same style. Only scanty relics of antiquity have been found here; a post station was placed here by Pope Pius VI when the Via Appia Nuova was reconstructed in the late 18th century.

Suetonius claimed that a certain Claudius Russus, a forefather of the Julio-Claudian dynasty "having set up his statue at Forum Appi with a crown upon his head, tried to take possession of Italy through his dependents".
