= Thorania gens =

Ancient Roman family

The gens Thorania, also written Torania, was a minor plebeian family at ancient Rome. Only a few members of this gens are mentioned in history, but others are known from inscriptions.

== Origin ==
The nomen Thoranius is sometimes confused with Thorius, on other occasions with Turranius. It belongs to a class of gentilicia formed using the suffix -anius, typically derived from place names. The name might possibly be derived from Thurii in Bruttium, although none of the Thoranii known from history or epigraphy was from Bruttium.

== Praenomina ==
The praenomina used by the Thoranii were the most common at all periods of Roman history, including Lucius, Gaius, Marcus, Publius, Quintus, and Titus.

== Members ==
This list includes abbreviated praenomina. For an explanation of this practice, see filiation.

- Lucius Thoranius Balbus, a legate serving under Quintus Caecilius Metellus Pius in Spain in 79 BC, he was defeated and slain by Sertorius. Florus calls him Thorius, which seems likely to be correct, given his surname.
- Toranius, a partisan of Pompeius, to whom Cicero wrote in 45 BC.
- Gaius Thoranius or Toranius, plebeian aedile alongside Gaius Octavius, after whose death Thoranius seems to have become guardian of the young Octavian. In 43 BC, his son persuaded the triumvirs to proscribe Thoranius, in order to obtain his father's property. Thoranius died in the proscriptions, but his son, quickly spending his inheritance, resorted to theft, and was exiled, never returning to Rome.
- Thoranius, a famous mango, or slave-dealer, during the time of the Second Triumvirate. Macrobius refers to him as Toranius Flaccus.
- Thoranius, the son of a freedman, while tribune of the plebs in 25 BC, earned widespread praise for bringing his father with him to the theatre, and sitting with him in the section assigned to the tribunes.
- Gaius Thoranius Philero, buried at Rome in the first half of the first century.
- Titus Thoranius T. l. Salvius, a freedman, built a sepulchre at Rome, dating from the first half of the first century, for himself and his wife, the freedwoman Matia Prima.
- Quintus Thoranius, named in an inscription from Pompeii in Campania.
- Publius Thoranius Secundus, named in an inscription from Pompeii.
- Thorania, buried in a first-century tomb at Allifae in Samnium.
- Lucius Thoranius Alexander, built a first-century sepulchre for himself and his family at Casinum in Latium.
- Publius Toranius T. f. Secundus, a veteran of the Legio XIII Gemina, buried along with his wife, Junia Primigenia, in a first century tomb at Hasta in Liguria, built by their daughter, Torania Prima.
- Torania P. f. T. n. Prima, built a first-century tomb at Hasta for her parents, Publius Toranius Secundus and Junia Primigenia.
- Gaius Toranius C. l. Theseus, a freedman buried in a first-century tomb at Rome, aged forty-four.
- Publius Toranius, a soldier named in an inscription from Rome, dating between AD 135 and 137.
- Gaius Thoranius Honoratus, decurion of the third decuria of an unspecified organization at Rome, according to an inscription dating from the reign of Antoninus Pius.
- Thorania Secunda, buried in a second-century tomb at Rome, built by her husband, Gaius Cassius Valerianus.
- Lucius Toranius L. l. Demostenes, a freedman named along with the freedwomen Aprodisia Hilario, Demetria Eronia, and Livia, in an inscription from Interamnia Praetutiana in Picenum, dating between the beginning of the second century, and the early part of the third.
- Thorius Potitus, a centurion in the eighth cohort of the Legio III Augusta, stationed at Lambaesis in Numidia in AD 162.
- Thorania Hermione, built tombs at Caere in Etruria, dating from the latter half of the second century, for her husband, Tiberius Claudius Amandus, and son, Marcus Aponius Amandus.
- Thoranius Honoratus, decurion of the third decuria of the beam-maker's guild at Rome at the end of the second century.

=== Undated Thoranii ===
- Thoranius, a potter whose maker's mark was found on a piece of pottery from Arelate in Gallia Narbonensis.
- Marcus Thoranius Euhemerus, a negotiator frumentarius, or grain merchant, buried at Rome, with a monument from Quintus Paccius Quietus.
- Lucius Toranius Justus, built a tomb at Rome for his friend, who had been a soldier for ten years.
- Gaius Thoranius C. l. Lesbius, a freedman buried at Rome.
- Lucius Thoranius Marcellus, the freedman of Thoranius Priscus, buried at Rome, along with Priscus' son, Lucius Thoranius Sabinius.
- Gaius Thoranius C. l. Philargurus, a freedman named in a sepulchral inscription from Rome.
- Thoranius Priscus, the husband of Ulpia Chreste, dedicated a tomb a Rome for their son, Lucius Thoranius Sabinius, and the freedman Lucius Thoranius Marcellus.
- Torania Procula, buried at Rome.
- Lucius Thoranius Sabinius, buried at Rome, along with the freedman Lucius Thoranius Marcellus, with a monument from Sabinius' parents, Thoranius Priscus and Ulpia Chreste.
- Torania Spes, buried at Rome, in a tomb built by her husband, Marcus Postumius Heliodorus, for himself and his wife.
- Thorania Ɔ. l. Theodoris, a freedwoman buried at Rome, aged thirty.

== See also ==
- List of Roman gentes

== Bibliography ==
- Marcus Tullius Cicero, Epistulae ad Familiares.
- Valerius Maximus, Factorum ac Dictorum Memorabilium (Memorable Facts and Sayings).
- Gaius Plinius Secundus (Pliny the Elder), Historia Naturalis (Natural History).
- Lucius Mestrius Plutarchus (Plutarch), Lives of the Noble Greeks and Romans.
- Gaius Suetonius Tranquillus, De Vita Caesarum (Lives of the Caesars, or The Twelve Caesars).
- Lucius Annaeus Florus, Epitome de T. Livio Bellorum Omnium Annorum DCC (Epitome of Livy: All the Wars of Seven Hundred Years).
- Appianus Alexandrinus (Appian), Bellum Civile (The Civil War).
- Lucius Cassius Dio, Roman History.
- Paulus Orosius, Historiarum Adversum Paganos (History Against the Pagans).
- Ambrosius Theodosius Macrobius, Saturnalia.
- Dictionary of Greek and Roman Biography and Mythology, William Smith, ed., Little, Brown and Company, Boston (1849).
- Theodor Mommsen et alii, Corpus Inscriptionum Latinarum (The Body of Latin Inscriptions, abbreviated CIL), Berlin-Brandenburgische Akademie der Wissenschaften (1853–present).
- Notizie degli Scavi di Antichità (News of Excavations from Antiquity, abbreviated NSA), Accademia dei Lincei (1876–present).
- René Cagnat et alii, L'Année épigraphique (The Year in Epigraphy, abbreviated AE), Presses Universitaires de France (1888–present).
- George Davis Chase, "The Origin of Roman Praenomina", in Harvard Studies in Classical Philology, vol. VIII, pp. 103–184 (1897).
- T. Robert S. Broughton, The Magistrates of the Roman Republic, American Philological Association (1952–1986).
