= Cisterna di Latina =

- Comune
- Comune di Cisterna di Latina
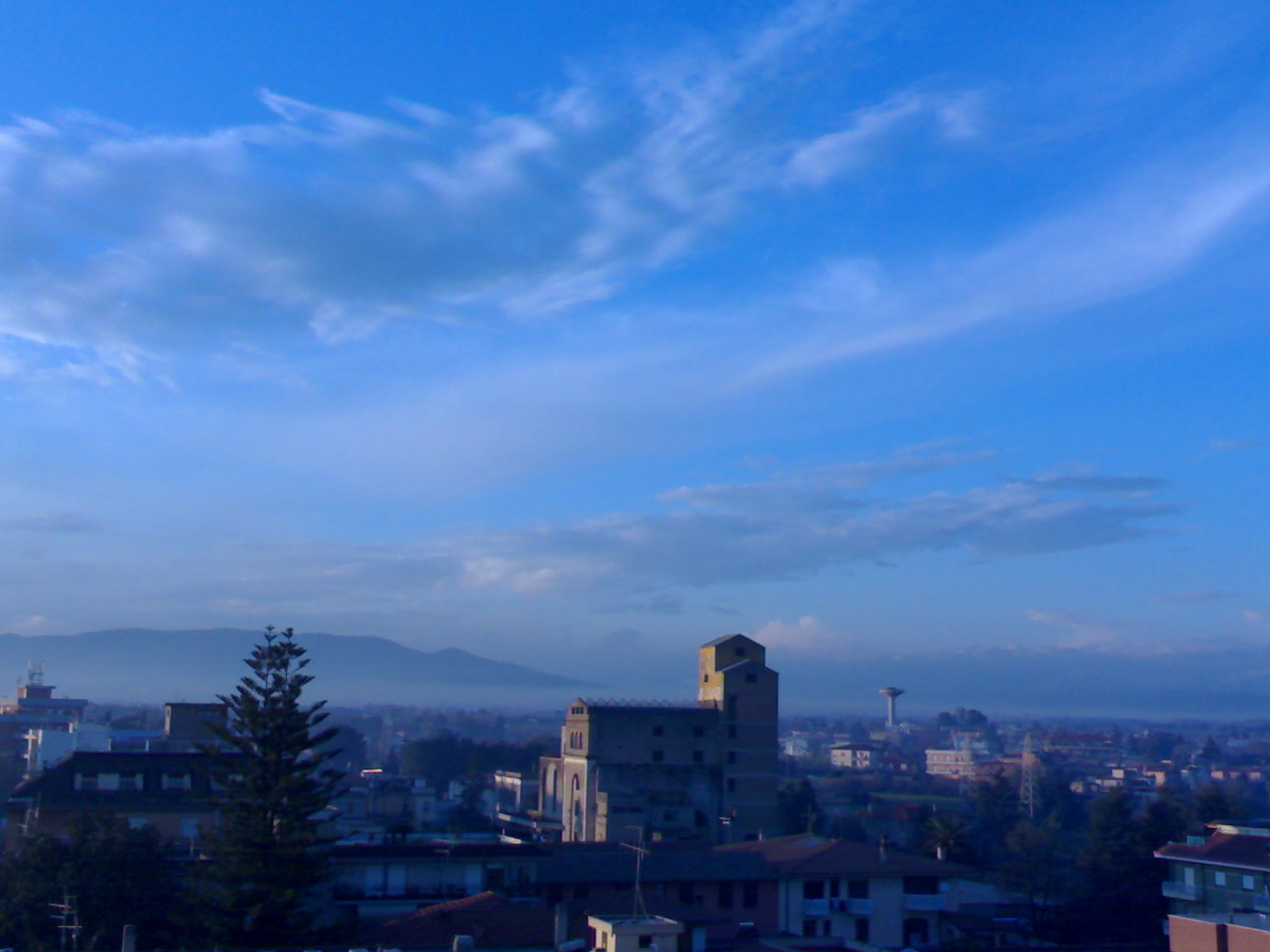
- View of Cisterna di Latina

- Coat of arms

- Location within Italy Location within Lazio
- Coordinates: 41°35′27″N 12°49′42″E
- Country: Italy
- Region: Lazio
- Province: Latina (LT)
- Frazioni: Borgo Flora, Olmobello, Prato Cesarino, Le Castella, Doganella, Sant'Ilario-Castelverde, Isolabella

Government
  - Mayor: Valentino Mantini

Area
  - Total: 144.16 km^{2} (55.66 sq mi)
- Elevation: 77 m (253 ft)

Population (31 July 2017)
  - Total: 36,939
  - Density: 256.24/km^{2} (663.65/sq mi)
- Demonym: Cisternesi
- Time zone: UTC+1 (CET)
  - Summer (DST): UTC+2 (CEST)
- Postal code: 04012
- Dialing code: 06
- Patron saint: St. Roch
- Saint day: August 16
- Website: Official website

Cisterna di Latina is a town and comune in the province of Latina in Lazio, of central Italy. It was the scene of the Battle of Cisterna in January 1944.

The Garden of Ninfa is located in the commune's territory.

The town, then known as Tres Tabernae ("The Three Taverns") is mentioned in the Acts of the Apostles as one of the towns where Saint Paul stopped on his way to Rome.

== History ==
At Finocchione, in the territory of Cisterna, traces of prehistoric human presence have been discovered. In historic times, the Volsci founded here their still unidentified centre called Ulubrae, although the lost city of Suessa Pometia could also have been located nearby. Ulubrae is mentioned by Horace, Pliny the Elder, Suetonius, Cicero and Juvenal, referring to the numerous patrician villas built here. According to Suetonius, Augustus lived here in his family villa until the age of eighteen.

A village, called Tres Tabernae, originated starting from 312 BC as a post station on the Via Appia, its name stemming from the presence of three taverns. The site is mentioned in the Acts of the Apostles as the place where St. Paul stopped during his journey to Rome, and was housed by the local Christian community. Around the 3rd century AD, the area was invaded by marshes, and the inhabitants of Ulubrae likely moved to Tres Tabernae, which grew in importance and became a Christian bishopric site with a Palaeo-Christian cathedral dedicated to St. Paul. In 307, emperor Flavius Severus was assassinated here by Heraclius, by order of rival usurper Maxentius. The barbarian invasions in Italy caused further expansions of the marshes, and Tres Tabernae declined until, in 592, pope Gregory I united its diocese to that of Velletri. Later in the high Middle Ages, Tres Tabernae was ravaged several times by the Saracens, until it was completely destroyed in 868.

The inhabitants moved to a small hill nearby, which is mentioned for the first time around 1000 AD as Terra di Cisterna, which, according to tradition, stemmed from Cisterna Neronis ("Nero's Cistern). An ancient cistern still exits today under the Palazzo Caetani at the top of the hill. Cisterna housed a Benedictine abbey dedicated to St. Eleutherius (later abandoned) and was a fief of the Counts of Tusculum, who ceded it to the Frangipani in 1146. The latter reinforced it with a line of walls and a rocca (castle). In 1159 Pope Alexander III fled here to escape emperor Frederick Barbarossa who, in retaliation, destroyed the borough, which was later rebuilt by the Frangipani. In 1328 it was again besieged and ravaged by emperor Louis IV.

In 1504 Pope Julius II assigned Cisterna to the Caetani. Their member Bonifacio Caetani renewed the city and, after demolishing it, rebuilt the castle as a patrician palace which still exists.

In the early 19th century, a land reclamation project for the area was launched by Pope Pius VI, but this was halted by the arrival of French troops in the course of the French Revolutionary Wars. Danish writer Hans Christian Andersen stopped here in 1840. The town, after a plebiscite, changed its name into Cisterna di Roma. A new reclamation project started under the Fascist Government in 1929, at a time in which swamps and marshes occupied much of the communal territory; this led to the creation of the nearby major center of Littoria (modern Latina); the town was re-christened Cisterna di Littoria as part of the newly created province of Latina.

During World War II, Cisterna was the site of a battle between the Germans and the Allies in 1944. 96% of the city's buildings was destroyed until the area was conquered by the Allies on May 25, 1944. The city was later rebuilt, in particular in the 1970s, after numerous industries were founded in the area with the support of the Cassa per il Mezzogiorno: Cisterna's inhabitants grew from some 7,000 in the 1940s to c. 30,000 in the 1980s. In the 1970s it became a major production center of kiwifruits. After the abolition of the Cassa per il Mezzogiorno, the industrial sector gradually lost importance and unemployement increased substantially in the territory.

== Notable people ==
John Ruskin visited Cisterna on July 6, 1841. He made a note of his impression of the Campagnia that day.

== Main sights ==
- Gardens of Ninfa
- Palazzo Caetani, built in 1560-1574 by cardinal Bonifazio Caetani under design of Francesco da Volterra, above the remains of the Frangipani castle. Damaged during World War II by allied bombings, it houses frescoes by Girolamo Siciolante da Sermoneta, Federico Zuccari and Taddeo Zuccari. A museum in the interior is dedicated to the horse and its shepherding in the area, with works by Aligi Sassu and others. The grottoes beneath it, traditionally the cisterns whence the city's name came though more likely ancient quarries of tuff and pozzolan later used as catacombs, are still partially unexplored.
- Church of Santa Maria Assunta in Cielo
- Convent of Convento di Sant'Antonio Abate, now abandoned. It also houses frescoes by Girolamo and by the Zuccari brothers. The cloister has frescoes with episodes of St. Francis' life.
- Archaeological area of Tres Tabernae (closed)
- Volscian archaeological area of Caprifico di Torrecchia, including a temple of Minerva
- Natural monument of Tenuta di Torrecchia Vecchia, a private garden and residential area designed by Gae Aulenti and others

== Twin towns – sister cities ==
- Fort Smith, Arkansas, United States, since 1984
- Grombalia, Tunisia, since 2003
