= Louis Burkhalter =

Louis Burkhalter was a French archaeologist and former delegate of the Société préhistorique française (French Prehistoric Society).

He was notable for his exploration and documentation of prehistoric sites in Lebanon and Syria. He made notable collections of Acheulean and Abbevillian bifaces from around the valleys and coasts and compiled an early list of prehistoric sites published by the National Museum of Beirut.

He is also notable in some fringe circles for suggesting the existence of giants as a "scientific fact" in the Acheulean period when commenting on the gigantic lithic finds of Denis Saurat at Sasnych in Syria. Later review of his suggestion notes that large lithics found could have been used for stunning and traps and present no evidence for giant populations.

== Bibliography ==
(Principal Publications)

- Burkhalter, Louis., "Bibliographie préhistorique (à suivre)." in Bulletin du Musée de Beyrouth. Tome VIII, 1946–1948.
- Burkhalter, Louis., "Bibliographie préhistorique (suite et fin)" in Bulletin du Musée de Beyrouth. Tome IX, 1949–1950.
