= Canaanean blade =

Archaeological term for a type of blade

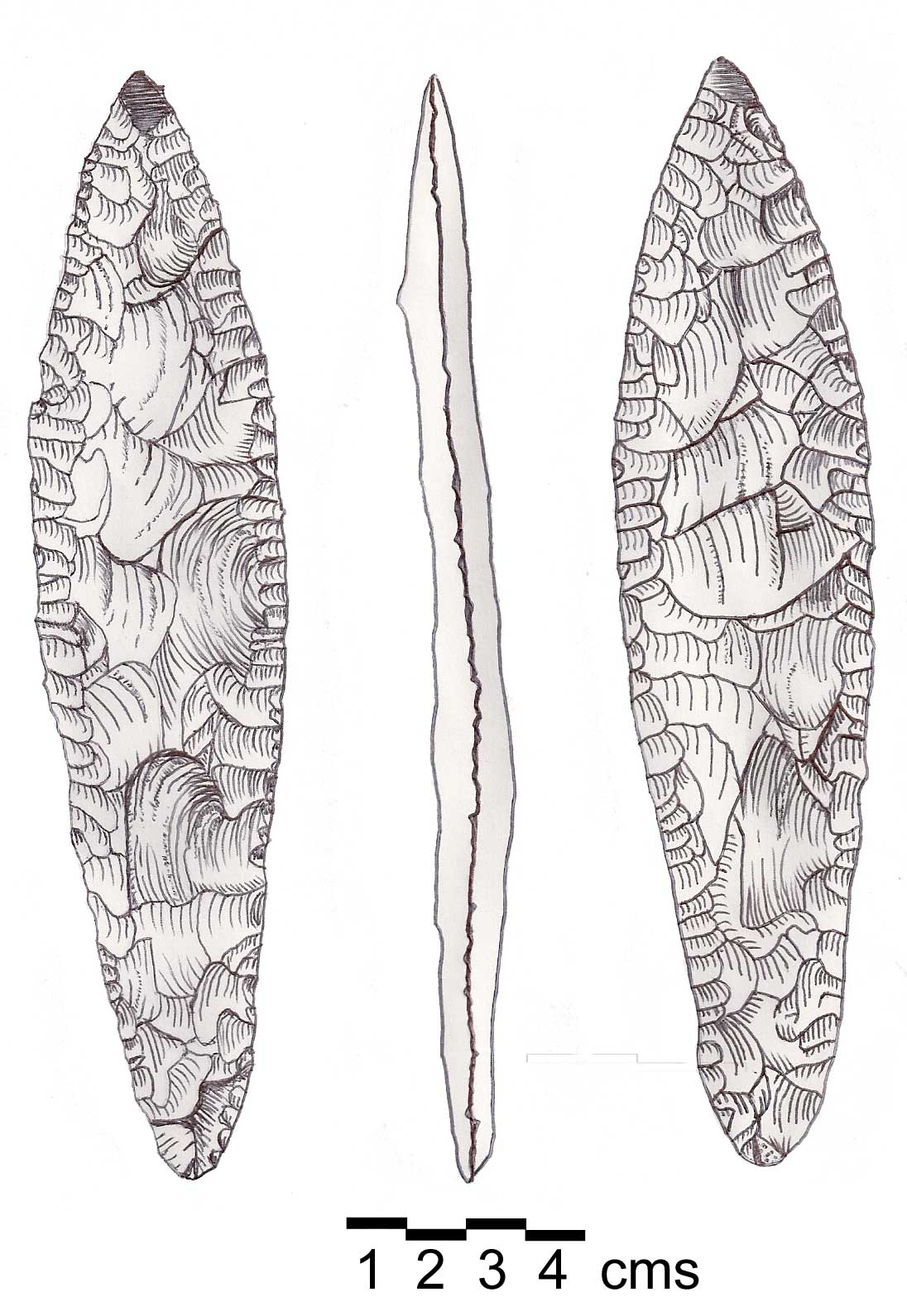
Canaanean Blade. Suggested to be part of a javelin. Fresh grey flint, both sides showing pressure flaking. Somewhat narrower at the base suggesting a haft. Polished at the extreme point. Found on land of the Lebanese Evangelical School for Girls in the Patriarchate area of Beirut, Lebanon.

A Canaanean blade is an archaeological term for a long, wide blade made out of stone or flint, predominantly found at sites in Israel and Lebanon (ancient Canaan).

== History ==
They were first manufactured and used in the Neolithic Stone Age to be used as weapons such as javelins or arrowheads. The same technology was used during the later Chalcolithic period in the production of broad sickle blade elements for harvesting of crops. Canaanean blades were also used in the threshing of cereal grains. This indicates the presence of early agricultural technologies.

== Use ==
The blades would be attached to a small wooden platform with bitumen. The platform, with a human or other weight standing on it, was then pulled behind an animal across a threshing floor. The forward motion of the animal paired with the downward force of weight exerted through the blades served to cut grain into small pieces.
