= Ulubrae =

Ancient village near Rome

Ulubrae was an ancient village about 50 kilometers (30 mi) from Rome, past the Three Taverns on the Appian Way, and at the start of the Pontine Marshes. It is known primarily for its use as a byword for a remote and empty location by Latin authors such as Cicero, Juvenal, and Horace. It could have been located, among the other proposed sites, in the territory of the current comune of Cisterna di Latina.

Its use in this proverbial fashion is also associated with the 18th-century Scottish Boswell family's country seat at Auchinleck. Alexander Boswell inscribed a line from Horace on Auchinleck House—"what thou seekest is here, it is in Ulubrae, unless equanimity is lacking"—and his son James Boswell referred to himself as the "Master of Ulubrae".

== See also ==
- Three Taverns
