= Tre Taverne =

Place on the ancient Appian Way

Coordinates: 41°33′43″N 12°52′26″E

Tre Taverne (Latin: Tres Tabernae; Greek: Τρεῖς Ταβέρναι, Treis Tabernai) was a place on the ancient Appian Way, about 50 km (31 miles) from Rome, designed for the reception of travellers, as the name indicates. In the Roman Empire there was also a place of that name (Tres Tabernae Caesaris) in present-day France.

== History ==
Tres Tabernae originated as a post station on the Appian Way (Latin: Via Appia), around the 3rd century BC.

Here, the Christian saint Paul of Tarsus, on his way to Rome, was met by a band of Roman Christians (Acts 28:15). The "Tres Tabernae was the first mansio or mutatio, that is, halting-place for relays, from Rome, or the last on the way to the city. At this point three roads run into the Via Appia, that from Tusculum, that from Alba Longa, and that from Antium; so necessarily here would be a halting-place, which took its name from the three shops there, the general store, the blacksmith's, and the refreshment-house...Tres Tabernae is translated as Three Taverns."

The Encyclopædia Britannica Eleventh Edition identifies it as "an ancient village of Latium, Italy, a post station on the Via Appia, at the point where the main road was crossed by a branch from Antium". It is by some fixed some 3 m. S.E. of the modern village of Cisterna just before the Via Appia enters the Pontine Marshes, at a point where the modern road to Ninfa and Norba diverges to the north-east, where a few ruins still exist (Grotte di Nottola), 33 m. from Rome. Others believe that it stood at Cisterna itself, where a branch road running from Antium by way of Satricum actually joins the Via Appia. However, excavations that took place at km 58.1 of the Via Appia Nuova between 1993 and 2001 revealed a bath plant and some further buildings.

Around the 3rd century AD, the area was invaded by marshes, and the inhabitants of the nearby Ulubrae likely moved to Tres Tabernae, which grew of importance and became a Christian episcopal see with a Palaeo-Christian cathedral dedicated to St. Paul. In 307, emperor Flavius Severus was assassinated (or forced to commit suicide) here by Heraclius, by order of other emperors Maximian and Maxentius. The barbaric invasions in Italy caused a further expansions of the marshes, and Tres Tabernae declined so that, in 592, Pope Gregory I united its diocese to that of Velletri. Later in the high Middle Ages, Tres Tabernae was ravaged several times by the Saracens, until it was completely destroyed in 868.

The position of the Tres Tabernae is also shown in the Tabula Peutingeriana in a location south of Rome.
