= Statio (Roman) =

Official stopping place on a Roman road

An ancient Roman statio (Latin for "position" or "location", pl. stationes) was a stopping place on a Roman road for travellers looking for shelter for the night and a change of horses. The name of the statio was sometimes a town or city with suitable accommodation, such as inns, and sometimes a dedicated building between larger settlements. They often included thermal baths in the facilities.

They are often referred to in English as a waystation or poststation.

They were sometimes identical to, or complementary to, mansiones, maintained by the central government for those on official business whilst travelling.

Stationes are mostly known through the famous Antonine Itinerary, a register of stationes and their distances along various roads of the Roman Empire, seemingly based on official documents, possibly from a survey carried out under Augustus.

Examples of stationes are:

- Tre Taverne
- Forum Appii
- Philosophiana in Sicily.
