= Special Troops of the Levant =

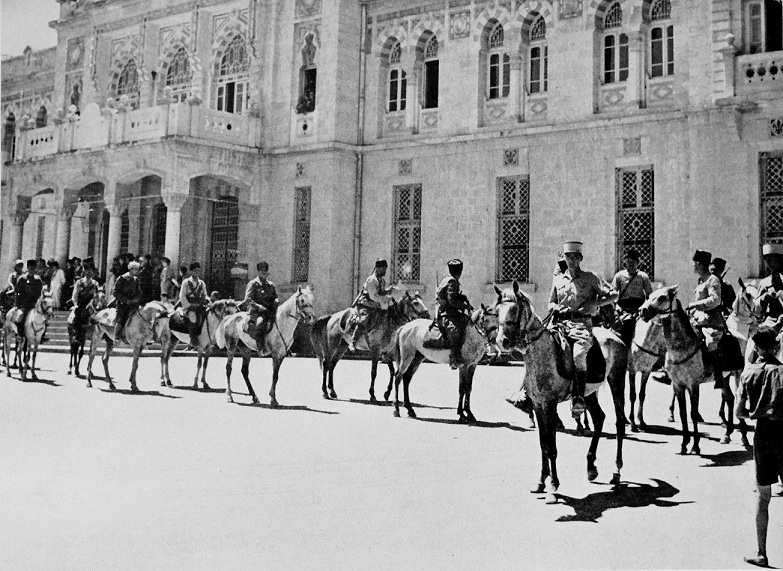
- Circassian cavalrymen of the special troops, rallied to Free France, in Damascus in June 1941.
- Active: 20 March 1930–1 August 1945
- Country: Greater Lebanon; Syrian Republic
- Allegiance: France
- Role: future national armies
- Size: 13,000

The Special Troops of the Levant (French: Troupes spéciales du Levant) were military units formed during the period of the French Mandate for Syria and the Lebanon, alongside the Army of the Levant. They were created in 1930 by merging the auxiliary troops (regular forces) called the Légion syrienne and the supplementary troops. Composed of locally recruited personnel, these troops subsequently formed the basis of the national armies of Lebanon and Syria.

== Formation ==
The Special Troops of the Levant were established by decree No. 3045 of 20 March 1930. General Gamelin, commander-in-chief of the Troops of the Levant, took part in their creation by launching in 1927, following the suppression of the Great Syrian Revolt, a plan to regularize the supplementary troops.

According to historian Jean-David Mizrahi, the men of the supplementary troops were recruited by France according to a communal logic, primarily within ethnic or religious minorities: Kurds, Circassians, Ismailis and Druzes thus represent 11% of the total population of the Levant States, but 63.4% of the personnel of the light squadrons. In 1927, more than 35% of Syrian officers came from the supplementary troops; they were traditional Kurdish, Druze, or Circassian leaders; "the proxy power actually facilitates the introduction of community logics within the Syrian-Lebanese military hierarchy," writes Mizrahi, "which has considerable political consequences".

== Organization ==
The troops were led by French, Lebanese, or Syrian officers and non-commissioned officers trained at the Military Academy of Homs. The Special Troops of the Levant comprised in 1930:

Cavalry

- 4 Line Squadrons of the Levant (ELL)
- 22 Light Squadrons of the Levant
  - including 8 Circassian Squadrons and 6 Druze Squadrons
- One Special Armored Car Squadron
- One Light Desert Armored Car Squadron

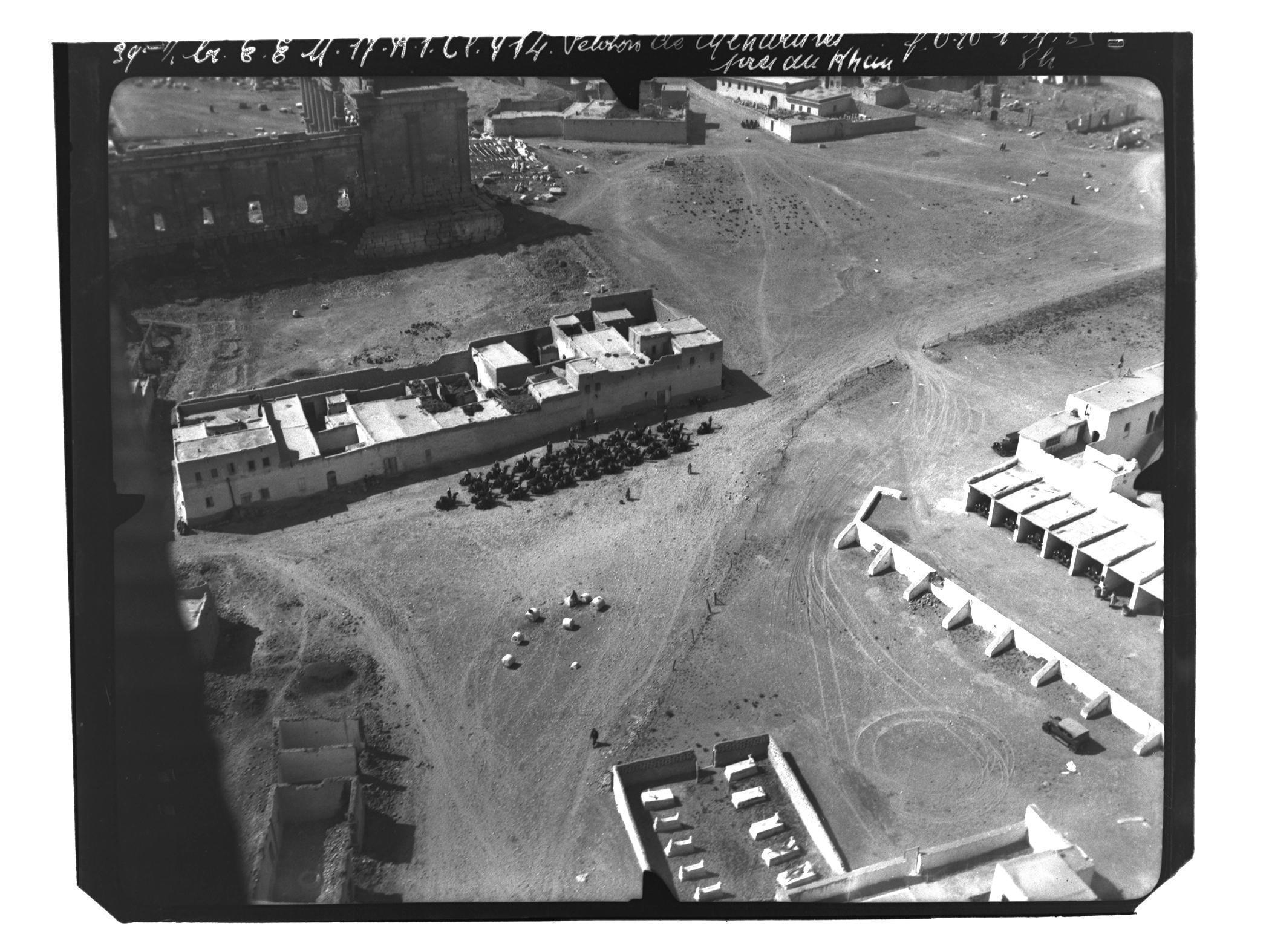
Camel-mounted troops of the special troops at Palmyra in 1935.

Infantry

- 8 Battalions of the Levant (BDL)
- 2 Lebanese Chasseur Battalions (BCL)
- 3 camel cavalry companies
- The band of the troops of the Levant

Artillery

- One foot artillery section
- One artillery workers section

Engineering

- One sapper-miner company
- One company of sapper-telegraphists
- One railway sapper company

Transport corps

- One horse-drawn transport company
- One motor transport company
- One section of secretaries, plantons, and orderlies

Aviation

- One auxiliary aviation workers section

The upkeep of the special troops was borne entirely by the Syrian and Lebanese states.

== Recruitment ==
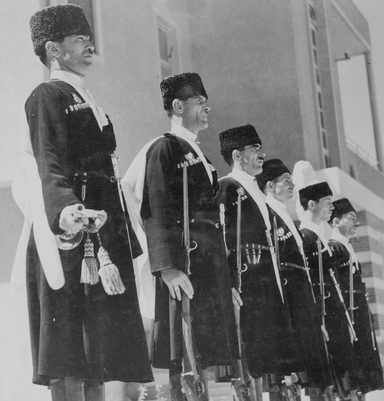
Circassian guard of General Weygand, commander of the troops of the Levant, in Beirut in May 1940.

The special troops saw the overrepresentation of certain minorities, such as the Druze and the Alawites, compared to others. Syrian and Lebanese Sunni Arabs, whose nationalist aspirations increasingly alarmed the French, gradually became less numerous from 1933 onward. Within each minority, the French favored recruitment from tribes and confederations they considered more loyal or more militarily effective.

== Second World War ==
At the outbreak of the Second World War, the special troops were reinforced through the recruitment of mounted or motorized partisan squadrons.

The special troops took part in the Syria–Lebanon campaign, mainly alongside the Vichy forces commanded by General Henri Dentz. Negotiations surrounding the Armistice of Saint Jean d'Acre initially planned to place the special troops under British command, but Free France ultimately secured control over them. Officially dissolved by an order issued by General Dentz on 31 July 1941, the special troops were reconstituted by an order from the commander of the Free French Forces in the Levant issued on 9 August 1941. The soldiers of the special troops, dispersed by the British offensive, were quickly recalled to reform their units, but the majority of the French command staff, which had remained loyal to the Vichy regime, had left the Levant.

In March 1942, the special troops numbered 384 officers (including 29 French), 1,519 non-commissioned officers (including 52 French), and 17,330 enlisted men. Total strength reached 23,000 men in 1944.

== After independence ==
On 1 August 1945, the special troops came under the full control of the Lebanese and Syrian governments.

The Lebanese Army was organized around the former Lebanese special troops, which were relatively well equipped and well armed. In contrast, the Syrian special troops suffered from a very high desertion rate, with deserters taking weapons and equipment with them.

Military personnel wishing to continue serving alongside the French could sign an addendum to their enlistment contracts (which is why they were referred to as "avenantaires"). In 1946, some of the avenantaires ultimately chose to join the national armies or to be demobilized. Approximately 840 avenantaires and 1,500 members of their families left the Levant in July together with the French Army. They were transferred to Madagascar, French Equatorial Africa, or French West Africa.
