= Circassian squadrons =

Military unit in Mandate Syria

The Squadrons' insignia.

The Circassian Squadrons (French: escadrons tcherkesses) were Circassian irregulars fighting for France during the Mandate for Syria and Lebanon from 1922 until the Mandate's dissolution in 1946.

Marc Martin-Siegfried (1911-1990), Louis Rivié (1911-1994) and Nicolas Roumiantzoff (1906-1988) all served with the squadrons and all became Companions of the Liberation, as did Philibert Collet.

== History ==
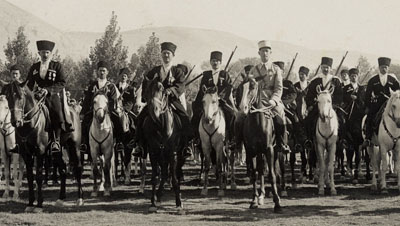
Lieutenant Collet with Circassian cavalry in the 1920s

The Circassians were expelled from the Caucasus by the Russian Empire in 1846, moving to what is now Lebanon, Syria, Palestine and Jordan.

France recruited its first Circassian cavalrymen in 1922 (two years after its Mandate's formation), forming 1st Mobile Gendarmerie Squadron. Eight squadrons were raised between September 1925 and June 1926, at the start of the Great Syrian Revolt. The first squadron was placed under lieutenant Collet and stationed in Damascus, where it acted as a cadre for forming other squadrons. They were recruited from Circassians from El Qnaitra but also included elements external to the community. They were numbered from 12th to 19th.

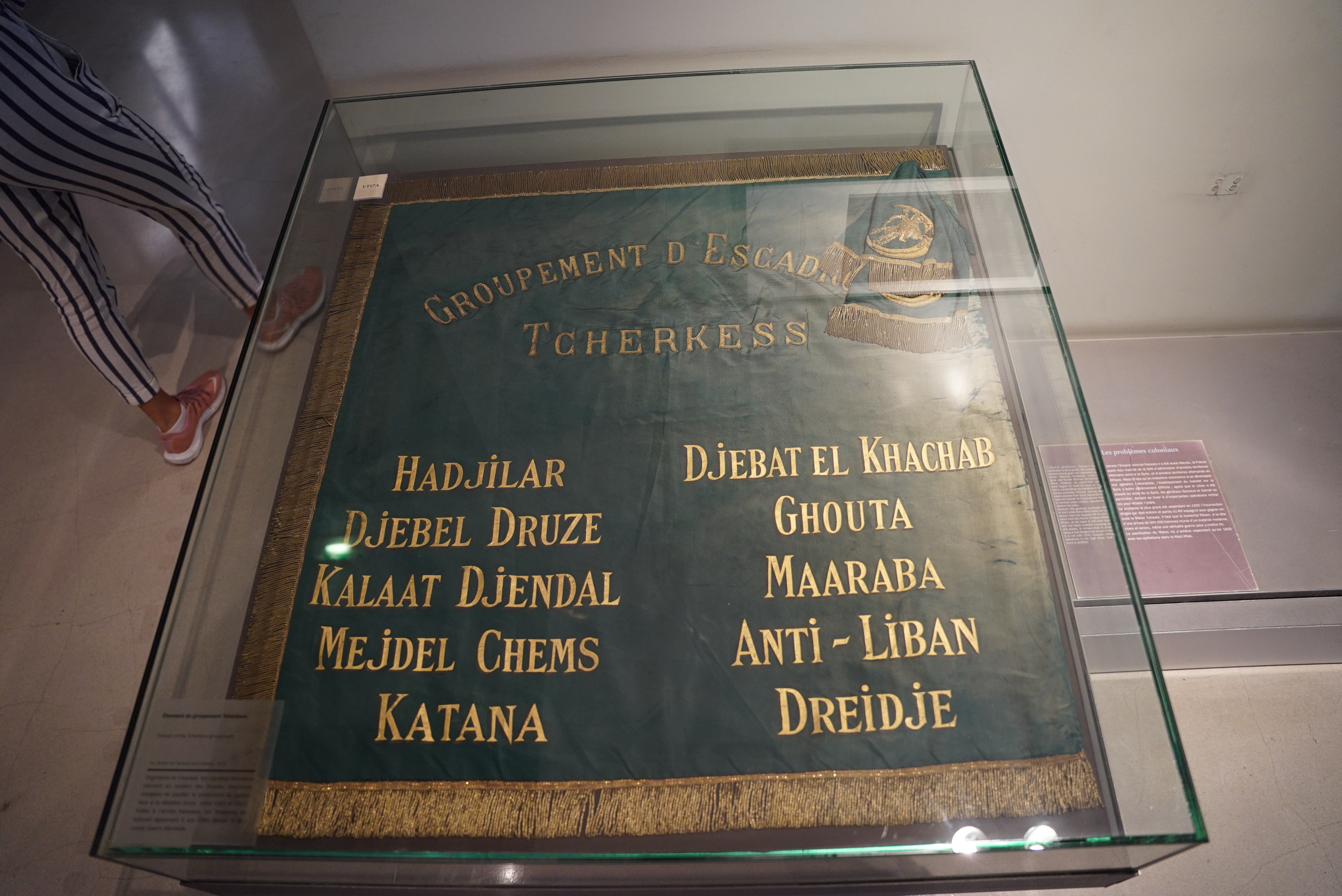
Colours of the Group on display at the Musée de l'Armée.

In November 1925 the squadrons were grouped together into the Circassian Squadrons Group, commanded by Collet. It was led by tribal chiefs and four French officers. The Circassians were well paid and allowed to pillage, both in order to ensure they stayed loyal. From 1927 the Circassians were merged into the Special Troops of the Levant, the regular army financed by Syria and Lebanon. The 19th Squadron left the Circassian Squadrons Group in the 1930s. The 16th Squadron was disbanded in 1937 to form the Mounted Lebanese Chasseurs.

Returning to the Group in October 1940 after commanding a battalion of the 1st Moroccan Tirailleur Regiment, Collet created new units within it - the 30th to 38th Squadrons of mounted Circassian partisans and 38th and 42nd Squadrons of motorised partisans, attached to a partisan group. Loyal to the Vichy Regime, they patrolled along the Mandate's border with Mandate Palestine and Transjordan, both in British hands.

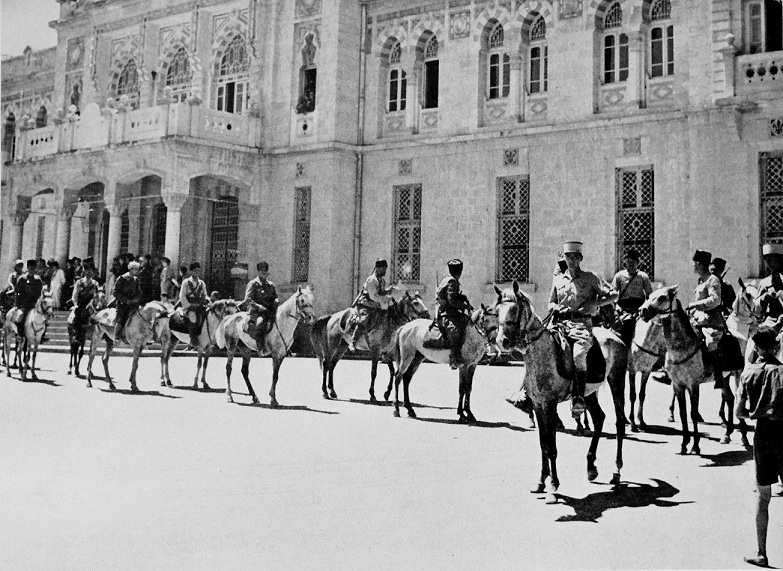
Circassians in the Free French Forces on 26 June 1941 in front of Hejaz railway station, Damascus.

On 21 May 1941 more than four-hundred Circassians joined Collet in deserting to the Free French Forces, but the other Circassians remained loyal to Vichy. The Vichy Circassians were reorganised as a Group, formed of two groups of light squadrons (including 12th to 16th and 18th Squadrons) and a group of four squadrons of mounted partisans. They fought the British during the Syria–Lebanon campaign, whilst Collet's Circassians fought beside 1st Free French Division. By the end of the war most of the Circassians had gone over to the Free French Forces, remaining in Levant until the end of the French Mandate. Many then left Syria after the French left.

== See also ==
- Army of the Levant
- Circassians in Syria
