= Battle of Beirut (1941) =

WWII battle in French Lebanon

- Part of the Syria–Lebanon campaign of World War II
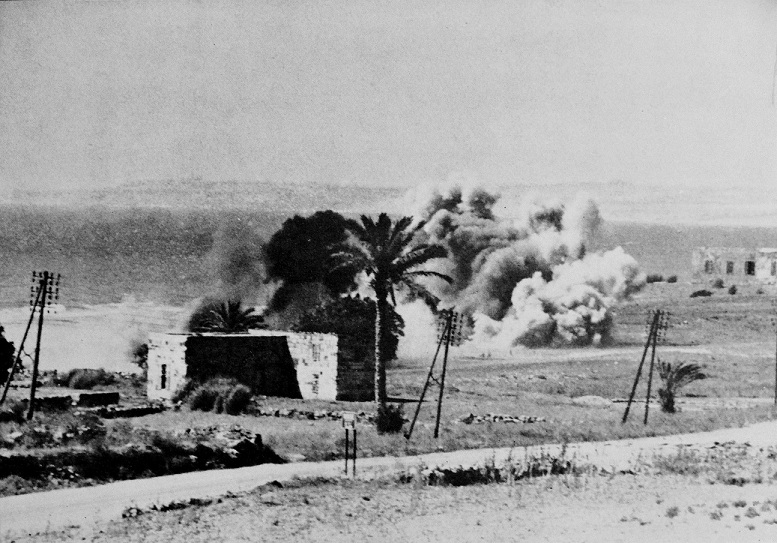
- Vichy shells explode among the Australians as they advance along the coast road south of Beirut
Date	12 July 1941
Location	Beirut, French Lebanon
Result	Allied victory

Belligerents
Free France; United Kingdom: (British Raj) India; Australia	Vichy France: French Lebanon

Commanders and leaders
(United Kingdom) Henry Wilson	Henri Dentz

Strength
	35,000–45,000; 90 tanks 120 artillery pieces 30 bombers 60 fighters

The Battle of Beirut (12 July 1941) marked the end of hostilities in the Syria–Lebanon campaign of World War II.

The campaign saw the initial Allied deployment of 2 brigades of the Australian 7th Division, a brigade from the 1st British Cavalry Division, the 5th Indian Infantry Brigade which was deployed immediately from Eritrea after the surrender of the Duke of Aosta, several armoured and air units of the British 6th Division, a special commando force (C battalion of the Special Service Brigade) and 6 battalions of the 1st Free French Division.

On 8 July, even before the fall of Damour, the Vichy French commander—General Henri Dentz—had sought an armistice: the advance on Beirut together with the Allied capture of Damascus in late June and the rapid advance of Allied troops into Syria from Iraq in early July to capture Deir ez Zor and then push on towards Aleppo had made the Vichy position untenable. At one minute past midnight on 12 July, a ceasefire came into effect. For all intents and purposes, this ended the campaign and an armistice was signed on 14 July at the "Sidney Smith Barracks" on the outskirts of the city of Acre. The armistice placed Syria under the French general Charles de Gaulle.

The triumphant entry of the Australian 7th Division into Beirut successfully established the Allied occupation of Lebanon. Beirut later became an important Allied base for Mediterranean naval operations.
