= Battle of Damascus (1941) =

Second World War battle in Syria during 1941

- Part of the Syria–Lebanon campaign of World War II
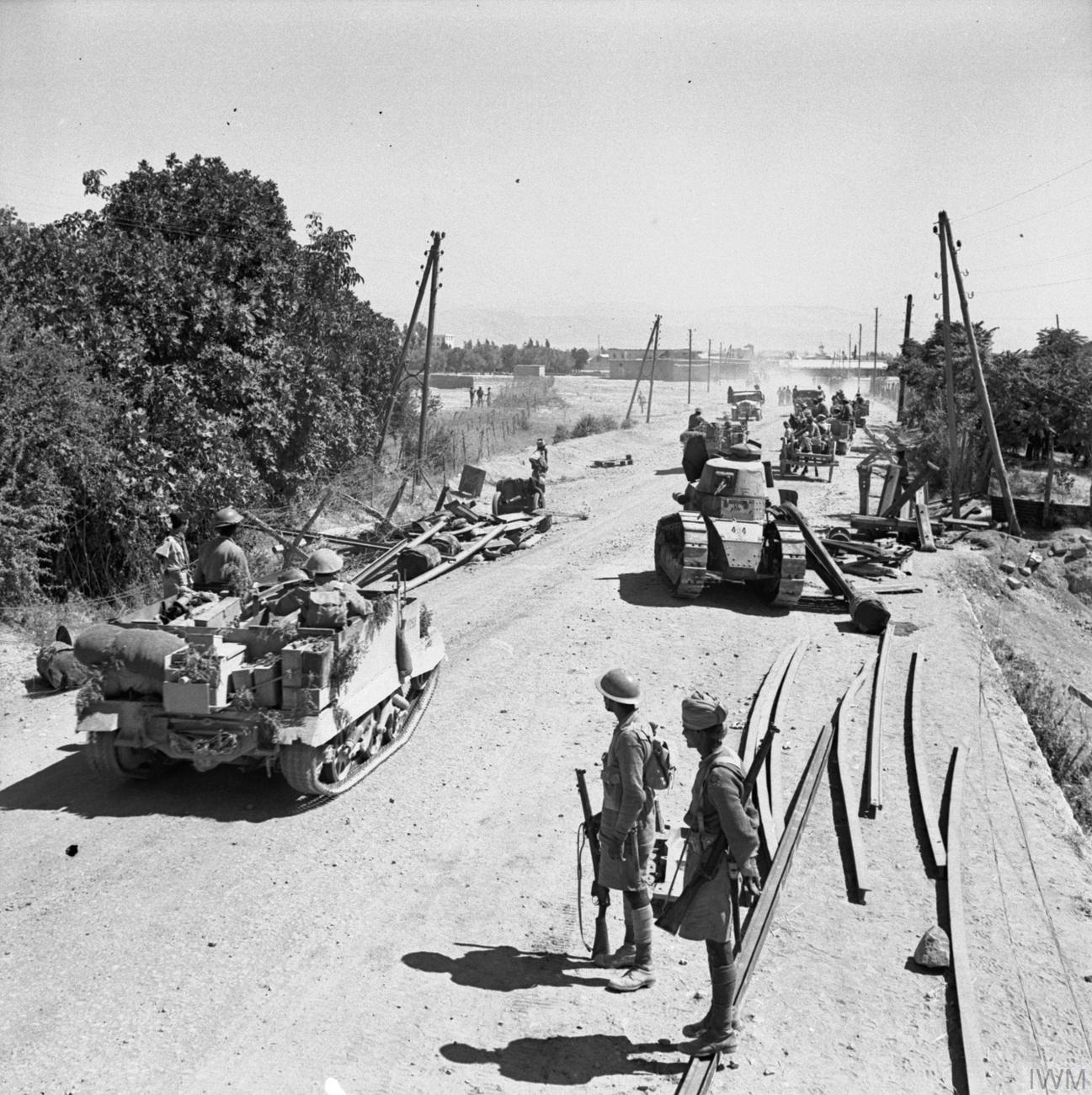
- Indian troops outside Damascus on 26 June 1941.
Date	18–21 June 1941
Location	Damascus, Syria 33°30′00″N 36°18′00″E
Result	Allied victory

Belligerents
United Kingdom: (British Raj) India; Free France; Australia	Vichy France

Commanders and leaders
(United Kingdom) Henry Wilson (United Kingdom) Wilfrid Lloyd (Free France) Paul Legentilhomme	Henri Dentz

Map of Syria and the Lebanon during World War II

The Battle of Damascus (18–21 June 1941) was the final action of the Allied advance on Damascus in Syria during the Syria–Lebanon campaign in World War II.

The initial advance was undertaken by Indian troops who were tasked with capturing Mezzeh while Free French forces were to capture Qadam. While the Free French were held up, the Indian troops were able to capture Mezzeh and then became cut off following a Vichy French counterattack. British and Australian reinforcements were brought up and throughout 19–20 June, the Indian troops holding Mezzeh continued to hold out despite running low of ammunition and rations. Late on 20 June, Australian troops attempted to relieve them and entered the town, arriving to find that the town was deserted, as the remaining Indian troops had been captured by the Vichy French and removed from the town earlier in the day. The following day, the Free French, supported by British and Australian troops, captured Qadim and throughout 21 June further actions were fought around the Quneitra road and the Barada Gorge. By mid-morning on 21 June the Vichy French garrison in Damascus surrendered to the Allied forces.

== Background ==
On 8 June 1941, troops of the 5th Indian Infantry Brigade Group had crossed the Syrian border from the British Mandate of Palestine to take Quneitra and Deraa with the objective of opening the way for the forces of the 1st Free French Division to advance along the roads from these towns to Damascus. This was one of four attacks planned for the campaign by the Allied commander, General Sir Henry Wilson.

By 17 June this force, named Gentforce after its commander Major-General Paul Legentilhomme, was resting and consolidating following hard fighting to gain Kissoué and the hills behind and was planning a final push to Damascus along the two main roads from the south, from Quneitra and Kissoué. Gentforce had been under the temporary command of the commander of the 5th Indian Infantry Brigade, Brigadier Wilfrid Lloyd, since 12 June when Legentilhomme had been wounded.

Alarmingly for the Allies, Quneitra had been recaptured by Vichy forces on 16 June. This threatened Lloyd's rear. By 18 June, Quneitra was recaptured but the Vichy forces from Quneitra still posed a potential threat to Gentforce's supply and communication lines. Nevertheless, it was decided that an early thrust to Damascus would force the Vichy commander to withdraw his forces to assist in its defence. Thus, the threat to Gentforce's rear was to be relieved.

== Battle ==
The plan called for the troops of 5th Indian Brigade to advance northwards from their positions at Artouz on the Quneitra–Damascus road across country west of the road towards Mezzeh. Mezzeh was a large village on a junction with the Beirut to Damascus road, some three miles west of Damascus itself. The brigade's supplies, ammunition and the anti-tank element would follow closely behind on the road proper. Meanwhile, the Free French forces would advance along the Kissoué – Damascus road to capture Qadim as a preliminary to entering the Syrian capital, some four miles further north.

At 20:30 on 18 June, the Indian troops set out and skirmished their way north. They reached Mezzeh at 04:15. By 05:30, after an hour of fierce hand-to-hand fighting, Mezzeh was captured. However, there was a major problem: the equipment and anti-tank guns travelling up the main road had earlier got ahead of the infantry and run into a Vichy roadblock where most of the vehicles were knocked out. Furthermore, the planned advance by the Free French to Qadim had been delayed, allowing the Vichy defenders to concentrate on the Mezzeh action, putting intense pressure on the Allied position whilst thwarting any attempt to relieve them and bring in vitally needed anti-tank weapons.

On 19 June, Major General John Evetts, commander of the British 6th Infantry Division, arrived to relieve Lloyd and take control of the Allied forces east of Merdjayoun. With the losses suffered by the Indian brigade, he requested that the British 16th Infantry Brigade be detached from the 7th Australian Division and sent to his sector. Three Australian battalions were also detached to Evetts' command: the 2/3rd Machine Gun Battalion and the 2/3rd and 2/5th Infantry Battalions.

Sketch map of the area of the Battle of Damascus, June 1941

By nightfall on 19 June, the Allied position at Mezzeh was desperate. Ammunition was running low, no food had been eaten for 24 hours, casualties were severe, and medical supplies were exhausted. During the night (when Vichy attacks were suspended), three men managed to reach Gentforce headquarters with the news of the position in Mezzeh. Early on 20 June, Brigadier Lloyd, having handed over to Evetts, resumed command of the 5th Indian Brigade and sent a force comprising two companies from the 3/1st Punjab Regiment, two companies of French Marines and a battery of artillery to fight its way through to Mezzeh. But they could not blast a way through and they progressed only slowly against determined opposition from French tanks. A Free French attack on Qadim the previous night had failed expensively, so that they were unable to exert pressure on Qadim that morning to draw Vichy forces away from Mezzeh. That night, however, the Free French with support from British anti-tank and anti-aircraft guns and an Australian machine-gun battalion, advanced against light Vichy defences and captured Qadim on the morning of 21 June.

Throughout the night of 19–20 June, the Indian defenders at Mezzeh had continued to hold out. But by 13:30 on 20 June, with ammunition exhausted and having had no rations for 50 hours, they were being shelled at point blank range. A decision was made to ask for a truce to evacuate the wounded, to try to buy time for the relieving column (which could be heard fighting in the distance), to reach them. However, the white flag was mis-read as a signal of surrender by the Vichy forces who rushed the positions of the remaining bayonet-wielding defenders and overpowered them. The relieving column, reinforced by a battalion of Australian infantry – the 2/3rd Infantry Battalion – recaptured Mezzeh at 19:00 that evening to find it empty save for the dead.

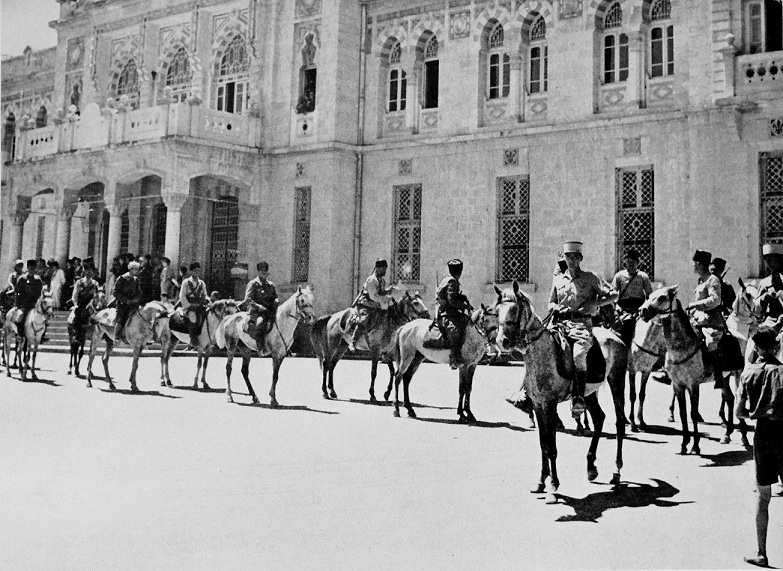
Free French Circassian Cavalry outside the railway station in Damascus, 26 June 1941

Throughout the evening of 20–21 June, the Australians fought several actions, attacking a series of stone forts overlooking the Mezzeh and the Quneitra road. Elsewhere, a company of Australians attempted to move around the left flank of the Vichy defenders to cut the road running north-west to Beirut and establish a road block in the Barada Gorge. A see-sawing action took place amongst the forts, during which a force of 59 Australians was briefly captured, before a counter-attack early on 21 June freed them and retook the forts. Meanwhile, a 12-hour defensive action held the Barada Gorge to the west, turning back several French attacks that included tanks and armoured cars.

== Aftermath ==
During the morning of 21 June, the Australians consolidated their positions around the forts, and in the Barada Gorge and around 11:00, the Vichy French garrison in Damascus surrendered. By noon on 21 June, the Allied forces were in Damascus and the Vichy forces were retreating west along the Beirut road. With the fall of Damascus, Gentforce accomplished its primary goal. Elsewhere, fighting around Merdjayoun continued until 24 June when Allied forces eventually captured the town. The fighting between the Vichy forces and the Allies continued throughout the month. Further actions included fighting around Damour and the capture of Beirut. Finally, an armistice came into effect on 12 July.

== See also ==
- Mediterranean and Middle East Theatre
