= Battle of Deir ez-Zor =

Battle of Deir ez-Zor may refer to:

- Battle of Deir ez-Zor (1941)
- Various battles/offensives in the Syrian Civil War (see Deir ez-Zor Governorate campaign)
