= Georges Catroux =

French Army general and diplomat (1877–1969)

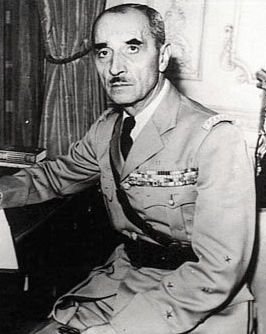
- General Catroux in London, October 1940, after he joined de Gaulle's staff

General Delegate of Free France in the Levant
- In office 24 June 1941 – 7 June 1943
- Preceded by: Henri Dentz as High Commissioner of the Levant
- Succeeded by: Jean Helleu

Governor General of French Indochina
- In office 1939–1940
- President: Albert Lebrun
- Preceded by: Jules Brévié
- Succeeded by: Jean Decoux

Personal details
- Born: Georges Albert Julien Catroux; 29 January 1877 Limoges, Haute-Vienne, France
- Died: 21 December 1969 (aged 92) Paris, France
- Awards: Grand Cross of the Légion d'honneur

Military service
- Allegiance: France
- Branch/service: French Army
- Years of service: 1898–1961
- Rank: Général d'Armée
- Commands: 19th Corps
- Battles/wars: World War I World War II

Georges Albert Julien Catroux (French pronunciation: [ʒɔʁʒ albɛʁ ʒyljɛ̃ katʁu]; 29 January 1877 – 21 December 1969) was a French Army general and diplomat who served in both World War I and World War II, and served as Grand Chancellor of the Légion d'honneur from 1954 to 1969.

== Life ==
Catroux was born in Limoges, Haute-Vienne. He was the son of a career officer who had risen through the ranks. He was educated at the Prytanée National Militaire, and entered the École spéciale militaire de Saint-Cyr in 1896.

In the early years of his distinguished military career, Catroux moved from Algeria (where he met Charles de Foucauld and then Lyautey) to Indochina. In 1915, while commanding a battalion, he was taken prisoner by the Germans. During his time in captivity, Catroux met Charles de Gaulle, who was then a captain.

After World War I, he became a member of the French military mission to Arabia, and then served in Morocco, Algeria and the Levant.

In July 1939, Catroux was appointed Governor General of French Indochina, and in August 1939, one month before the declaration of war, took over from a senior civil servant, Jules Brévié. Paris wanted to send a strong signal to the Far East on the eve of hostilities. However, after the first Japanese ultimatum of 17 June 1940, and following disagreements with the new Vichy government, Catroux was ordered to hand over his post to Admiral Jean Decoux on 25 June. He initially ignored the order, and only resigned on 20 July.

He then chose to join de Gaulle, who was by now leader of the Free France movement. As a five-star general, Catroux was the most senior officer of the French Army to transfer allegiance.

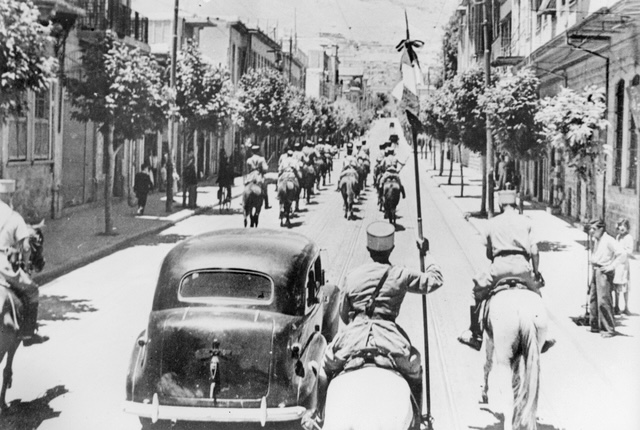
The fall of Damascus to the Allies, late June 1941. A car carrying the Free French commanders, General Georges Catroux and General Paul Louis Le Gentilhomme, enters the city. They are escorted by French Gardes Tcherkess (Circassian cavalry).

De Gaulle appointed him General Delegate of Free France in the Levant on 24 June 1941. He took control of Syria for the Free French after the defeat of Vichy General Henri Dentz and the Armistice of Saint Jean d'Acre. Shortly after taking up the post, Catroux, in the name of the Free French movement, recognised the independence of Syria. De Gaulle subsequently appointed him Governor General of Algeria in 1943-44.

Officially honored as a French liberation fighter, Catroux was Minister for North Africa in the first government of Charles de Gaulle from 9 September 1944 to 21 October 1945, and became ambassador to the USSR in 1945-48.

After the unrest in Morocco, Catroux negotiated the return of the sultan Mohammed V in 1955.

As Resident Minister in Algeria for the government of Guy Mollet in 1956, he was unable to take up his post because of demonstrations in Algiers by French residents on 6 February.

Catroux presided over a board of inquiry, the Catroux Commission, that investigated the French defeat at the Battle of Dien Bien Phu. He was also the judge in the military tribunal which tried the generals involved in the Algiers putsch of 1961.

He died in Paris in 1969.
