= Henri du Couëdic de Kerérant =

French naval officer

Amiral Henri Du Couëdic de Kerérant
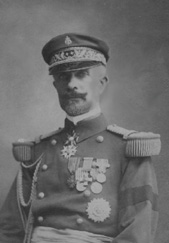
- French Admiral
- Born: April 18, 1868; Fontenay le Comte, France
- Died: February 17, 1947; Paris, France
- Occupation: Navy Officer
- Spouse: Marie du Bouaÿs de la Bégassière.
- Children: Hervé du Couëdic de Kerérant
- Parent(s): Léandre du Couëdic de Kerérant, Thérèse Le Coursonnays

Admiral Henri du Couëdic de Kerérant (1868–1947) was a 20th-century French naval officer, serving during the First and Second World Wars. He was the commanding officer of the ship Jean-Bart in the Dardanelles during the Black Sea Mutiny. He restored authority on the ship that had been taken over by the mutineers. From June 1924 he was the commander in chief of the Division Navale du Levant (covering the eastern Mediterranean, the Sea of Marmara and the Dardanelles, the Black Sea, the Red Sea, and the Gulf of Aden).

Henri du Couëdic de Kerérant is issued from a very ancient noble family from Brittany dating back from the crusades (7th Crusade) and with a strong naval tradition. One of his ancestors was Ollivier du Couëdic de Kerdrain, Secrétaire Général des galéres, during the Regency (from 1713 until 1738) in France. His grandson Michel du Couëdic de Kerérant followed in his tracks as a capitaine de Vaisseau in the French Navy.

== Biography ==
=== Marriage and children ===
1895, married to Marie du Bouaÿs de la Bégassière.

- Hervé (1899–1955)
- Guilhemette (1897)
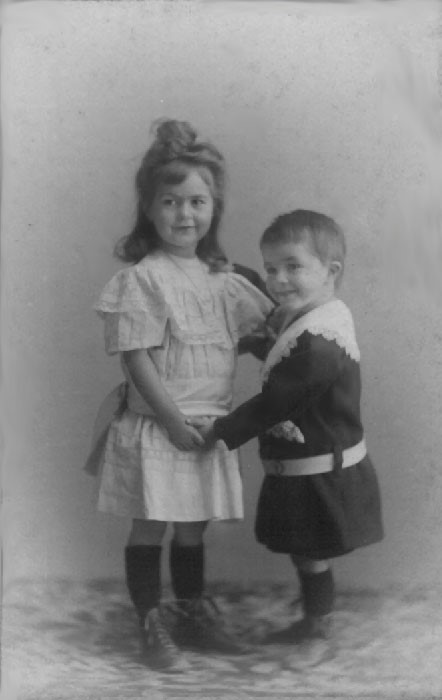

=== Career ===
- Sub Lieutenant from August 1, 1886
- Lieutenant from October 5, 1887
- Lieutenant Commander from 5 October 1889
- Commander from 26 February 1895
- Captain from 12 August 1911
- Commodore from 26 June 1916
- Rear Admiral from January 27, 1923

At Sea

- Bouvet, Saint Louis, Patrie - December 1, 1911 - November 11, 1913 - Deputy Commander (Artillery Service)
- Kléber - July 29, 1914 - June 25, 1915 - Commander
- Henri IV - August 9, 1915 - November 15, 1915 - second in command
- Jules Michelet - July 10, 1917 - March 25, 1918 - Captain of the Commander
- Jean-Bart - April 9, 1918 - April 15, 1920 - Captain of Commandant
- Commander, Cherbourg Military harbour - October 1, 1920 - July 1, 1922
- South of France Maritime boundaries - 4 April 1923 - 25 June 1924 - Chief of Staff
- Naval Division of the Levant - June 25, 1924 - July 2, 1926 - Fleet Commander

=== Distinctions (in French) ===
- Commandeur de la Légion d’honneur,
- Croix de guerre 14–18
- Distinguished Service Order (DSO)
- Commandeur de l’Ordre de sainte Anne de Russie
- Nicham Iftikar
- Médaille du Maroc

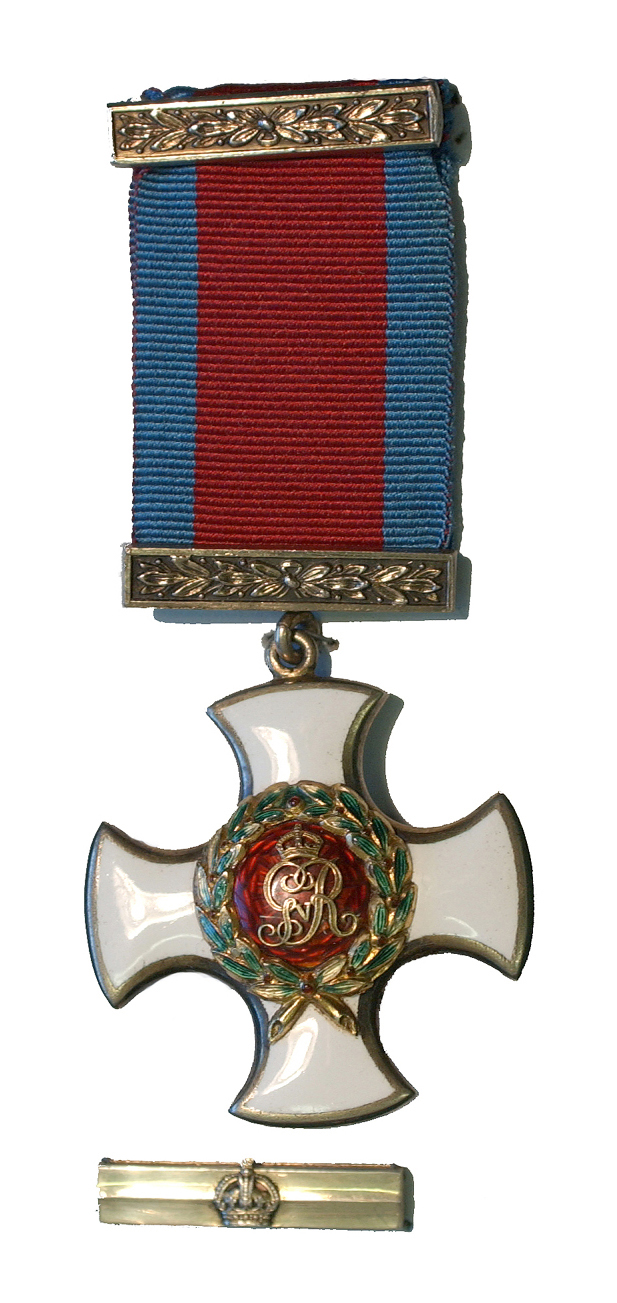
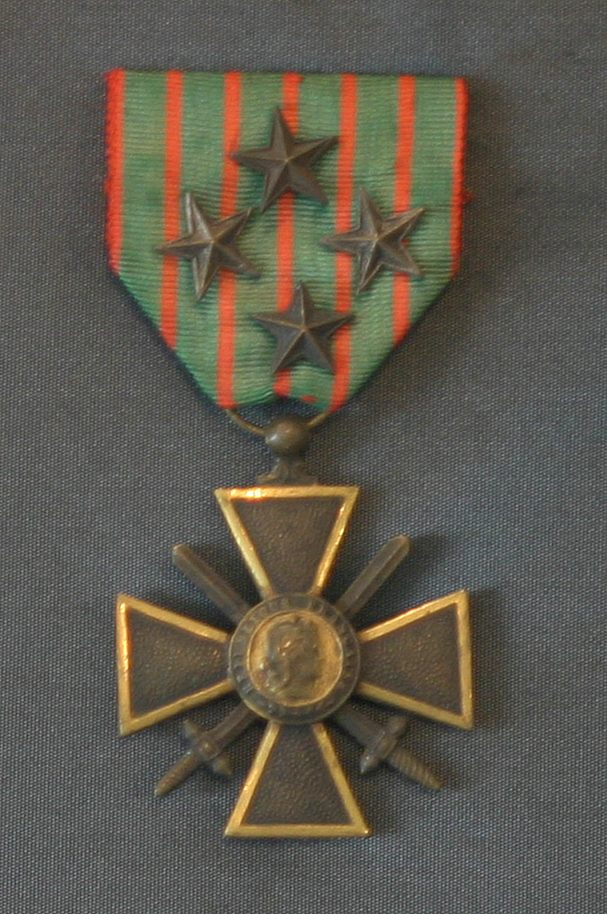
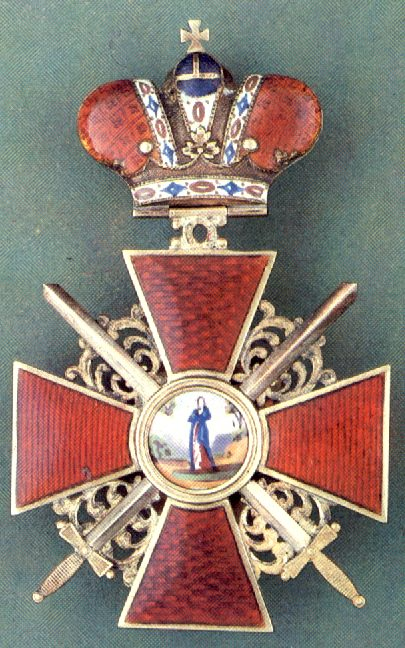

Legion of Honour

- chevalier du 24 December 1897
- officier 17 January 1917
- commandeur 30 April 1921

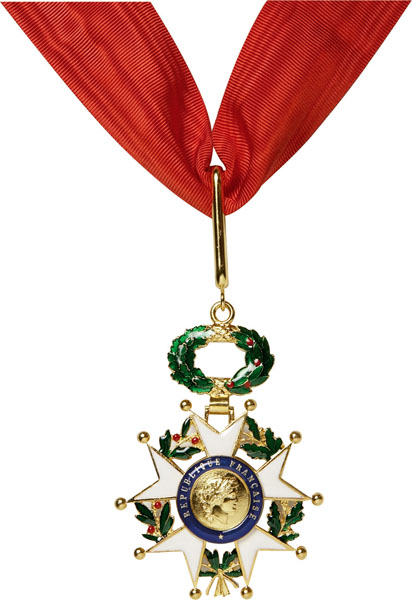

== Bibliography ==
- Archives de la Marine, fort de Vincennes, SHA
- Fernand Boucard Les Dessous de l’expédition de Russie, Paris 1929
- Fernand Merle L’Amiral Guépratte, Editions de la Cité, Paris A.
- J.P. Alem et P. Bourrat le Liban, Que sais-je ? mai 2000
- J. Nanlet Histoire du Liban, Tequi, Paris, 1986
- Marie Dupont Les Druzes Editions Brepols, Belgique 1994
- Christine Manigand Henry de Jouvenel, Haut-Commissaire de la République française en Syrie et au Liban (1925–1926). Le cours des guerres mondiales et conflits contemporains, nº 192 /1998
- Alain Peyrefitte (sous la direction de) L’aventure du XXème siècle 1900 – 1945. Editions du Chêne, 2000.
- Etienne Taillemite Dictionnaire illustré de la Marine. Edition Seghers, 1962
- Thomazi La guerre navale aux Dardanelles. Payot, Paris 1927
