= Battle of Deir ez-Zor (1941) =

Battle of World War II

Coordinates: 35°20′00″N 40°09′00″E

- Part of the Syria–Lebanon campaign of World War II
- Map of Syria and Lebanon during World War II
| Date | 3 July 1941 |
| Location | Deir ez-Zor, Syria |
| Result | Allied victory |

Belligerents
| United Kingdom: British India; (Jordan) Transjordan | Vichy France: Syria |

Commanders and leaders
| (United Kingdom) Henry Wilson (United Kingdom) William Slim | Henri Dentz |
- Deir ez-Zor 450 km (280 mi) north-east of Damascus on the Euphrates River

The Battle of Deir ez-Zor was part of the Allied invasion of Syria during the Syria-Lebanon campaign in World War II.

The Battle of Deir ez-Zor is noted for the bold outflanking tactics employed by Allied field commander William "Bill" Slim of Iraq Command. These tactics presaged Slim's employment of similar tactics in 1945 while commanding the British Fourteenth Army in Burma.

== Background ==
On 8 June 1941, the Allies had launched attacks from the British mandate of Palestine and Trans-Jordan in the south into Lebanon and south-west Syria. The intention was to prevent Nazi Germany from using Vichy French territory as a springboard for attacks on the Allied stronghold of British Egypt as the Allies fought a major campaign against Axis forces further west, in North Africa. By 20 June, Damascus had been captured, and the Allied campaign commander Henry Maitland Wilson ordered two further attacks from western Iraq toward Palmyra and Aleppo.

The force which gathered at Haditha comprised the 21st Indian Infantry Brigade and the 25th Indian Infantry Brigade of Bill Slim's 10th Indian Infantry Division plus the 2/8th Gurkha Rifles from 20th Indian Infantry Brigade (which had been detached for a different task). The division was to advance up the river Euphrates and take, successively, Abu Kamal, Deir ez-Zor, Raqqa and Meskene on the river before advancing on Aleppo in the far north-west of the country.

Deir ez-Zor was the chief city of eastern Syria with two important bridges across the Euphrates River.

== The battle ==
The advance units of 10th Indian Division left Haditha on 27 June and captured Abu Kamal without opposition. By 30 June, the main force was concentrated there and moved out on 1 July toward Deir ez-Zor. Progress on the poor road was slow and made more difficult by air attacks from Vichy aircraft but by early afternoon there were units within 9 miles of Deir ez-Zor.

Slim's original plan was to attack the city from the south-east whilst sending a flanking force wide round the south-east and which would attack along the road to Aleppo in the enemy's rear. Fuel was running low and the risk of the flanking force running dry and becoming immobile just as it came into contact with the enemy had to be considered. Slim decided that the risk was justified by the opportunity it afforded of taking the Vichy defenders by complete surprise.

The 2/10th Gurkha Rifles attacked from the south-west at 09:00 on 3 July. The flanking column (comprising infantry of 4/13th Frontier Force Rifles and armoured cars of the 13th Duke of Connaught's Own Lancers) had left Mayadin at 04:15, crossing the Palmyra road running south-west across their path about 20 mi (32 km) from Deir ez-Zor and reaching the Aleppo road by 10:30. As Slim had hoped, surprise was complete and the flanking force advanced rapidly into the city, capturing the bridges intact and destabilizing the defences facing the Gurkhas advancing from the south-east. By 11:00, these positions were abandoned and the two attacking forces joined up in the city. By 15:30, the last opposition in the city had been silenced although the Vichy air force continued to make telling attacks on the Allied ground forces.

Only 100 prisoners were taken because the bulk of the Syrian troops changed into civilian clothes and merged into countryside. However, 50 lorries, nine guns and five aircraft were captured and a considerable haul of arms, ammunition and petrol was made.

== Aftermath ==
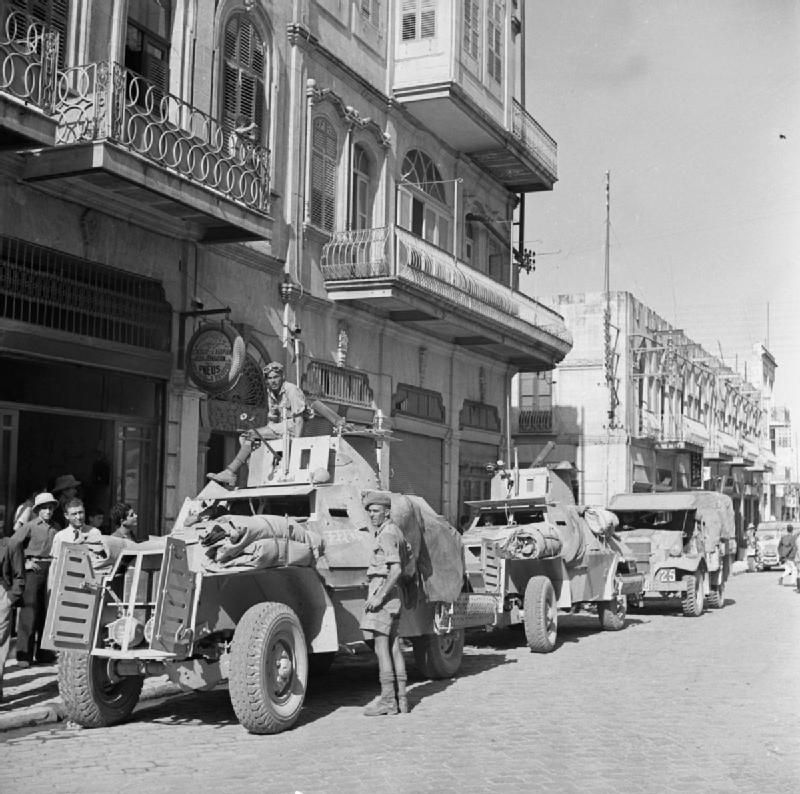
Marmon Herrington armoured cars in Aleppo on 22 July 1941

On 5 July, Raqqa was taken without opposition although the Vichy continued to hold the upper hand in the air and the Vichy airforce continued to inflict casualties such that supply convoys took to travelling at night. Meanwhile, two brigade groups each with two infantry battalions—operating independently under HQ British Troops Iraq—made moves in northern Iraq: 10th Indian Infantry Division's 20th Indian Infantry Brigade made a feint from Mosul and 8th Indian Infantry Division's 17th Indian Infantry Brigade (1/12th Frontier Force Regiment and 5/13th Frontier Force Rifles) advanced into the far north-east of Syria (the Bec du Canard or Duck's Bill province) capturing a long length of railway intact and large stores of arms and ammunition whilst sustaining no casualties. The Vichy forces withdrew westward along the Mosul-Aleppo railway, and Slim detached some of the Gurkha and Lancers force to head northwards from Raqqa on the Euphrates. They were involved in a skirmish at the Euphrates crossing at Jarabulus.

By 8 July, 10th Indian Division was advancing on Aleppo threatening the rear of the main Vichy forces around Beirut. The Vichy position had become untenable provoking General Dentz—the Vichy commander—to ask for an armistice. Negotiations began on 11 July, and the armistice terms were signed on 14 July.

== Bibliography ==
- Mackenzie, Compton (1951). Eastern Epic. London: Chatto & Windus. OCLC 1412578.
- Playfair, Major-General I.S.O.; Flynn, Captain F.C. (RN); Molony, Brigadier C.J.C. & Toomer, Air Vice-Marshal S.E. (2004) [1st. pub. HMSO:1956]. Butler, J.R.M. (ed.). The Mediterranean and Middle East: The Germans come to the help of their Ally (1941). History of the Second World War, United Kingdom Military Series. Vol. II. Uckfield, UK: Naval & Military Press. ISBN 1-84574-066-1.

== See also ==
- Iraqforce - Order of Battle - Syria 1941
