= Armistice of Saint Jean d'Acre =

1941 armistice ending the Syria-Lebanon Campaign

Coordinates: 32°56′54″N 35°04′40″E

The Armistice of Saint Jean d'Acre (also known as the Convention of Acre) concluded the Syria-Lebanon Campaign of World War II. The Armistice, signed on 14 July 1941, was between Allied forces in the Middle East under the command of British General Henry Maitland Wilson, and Vichy France forces in Syria and Lebanon, under the command of General Henri Dentz, Commander in Chief of the Army of the Levant (Armée du Levant) and as High Commissioner of the Levant.

== Description ==
Having lost control of the Northern Desert and the Euphrates Province and being threatened with the imminent loss of Beirut, General Dentz decided to ask for an armistice. On the evening of 11 July, British Lieutenant-General Claude Auchinleck, Commander-in-Chief of the Middle East Command, received a wireless message from Dentz proposing the suspension of hostilities six hours later, at midnight. General Dentz declared himself ready to engage in talks on the basis of a memorandum presented to him that morning by the United States Consul at Beirut on behalf of the British Government. But Dentz made the reservation that he was empowered by the French Government to treat only with the British representatives to the exclusion of those of the Free French.

The proposals presented by General Dentz were considered at once by the Middle East War Council. The council took into account the opinion of the American Consul at Beirut that Dentz was entirely insincere and might be playing for time in the hope of a last minute rescue by the Germans. Accordingly, his conditions were rejected by the British and he was called on to send his plenipotentiaries to the British outpost on the Beirut—Haifa Road at or before 0900 hours on 12 July. Failure to do this would lead to the resumption of hostilities at that hour.

On 12 July, the Vichy second in command, Lieutenant-General Joseph-Antoine-Sylvain-Raoul de Verdillac attended the talks. He went all the way from Syria to Acre in the British Mandate of Palestine and was escorted by a convoy of Australian high commanding officers. General de Verdillac represented the Army of the Levant for the Armistice talks instead of his superior commander, General Dentz. The 21 July 1941 issue of Time magazine indicates that Dentz sent de Verdillac to the talks because de Verdillac was more pro-British and less anti-De Gaulle than Dentz.

At 2200 hours on 12 July, the Armistice of Saint Jean d'Acre was initialled. The Allied forces were represented by General Wilson, by Air Commodore L. O. Brown, Royal Air Force, by Captain J. A. V. Morse, Royal Navy, and by Free French General Georges Catroux. The Vichy French were represented by de Verdillac.

The Armistice talks, the first between Great Britain and France since Napoleon's time, were held in the officers mess of "Sidney Smith Barracks", on the outskirts of the city of Acre. On this site was later founded Bustan HaGalil, an Israeli agricultural settlement. Despite the generosity of the British terms, representatives of Vichy made a brief show of refusing them, then dumped the whole mess into General Dentz's lap. On Bastille Day 14 July General Dentz, Vichy's High Commissioner to the Levant States, signed Syria and Lebanon away to the conquering British and to the Free French Forces. When General De Verdillac uncapped his pen to add his signature, all the lights in the room fused out, and so a dispatch rider's motorcycle was brought into the room to light the place with its head lamp.
