= Army of the Levant =

French colonial military force

The Army of the Levant (French: Armée du Levant) identifies the armed forces of France and then Vichy France which occupied, and were in part recruited from, the French Mandated territories in the Levant during the interwar period and early World War II. The locally recruited Syrian and Lebanese units of this force were designated as the Special Troops of the Levant (Troupes Spéciales du Levant).

== Origins ==
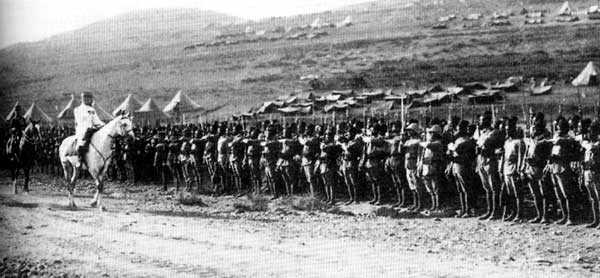
French General Henri Gouraud on horseback inspecting French colonial troops at Maysalun.

In September 1919, Lloyd George and Georges Clemenceau entered an agreement to replace the British troops occupying Cilicia with French soldiers.

A year later, in 1920, the League of Nations gave the French a mandate over Syria and Lebanon, forming the Mandate for Syria and the Lebanon. That year, from April 19 to April 26, the San Remo conference was held in Sanremo, Italy. After this conference was concluded, the short-lived monarchy of King Faisal was defeated at the Battle of Maysalun by French troops under the command of General Mariano Goybet, during the Franco-Syrian War. The French army under General Henri Gouraud consequently occupied Syria.

The first elements of this new army came from the former 156th Infantry Division of the Allied Army of the Orient, under General Julien Dufieux. This division from Cilicia included a metropolitan regiment (the 412th Infantry Regiment), two colonial regiments (the 17th Senegalese Tirailleurs and the 18th Algerian Tirailleurs), and a French Armenian Legion regiment. This division became the first of four divisions in the Levant.

A complementary force called the Syrian Legion was raised by the French authorities shortly after the establishment of the mandate. This comprised both cavalry and infantry units and was drawn mainly from minority groups within Syria itself.

== Inter-war period ==
Following the Druze revolt of 1925–1927, the Syrian Legion was reorganised into the "Special Troops of the Levant" (French: Troupes spéciales du Levant). The Special Troops were under French command but had some Syrian and Lebanese officers. The Army of the Levant was made up of North African infantry (tirailleurs) and cavalry (spahis), French Foreign Legion (French: Légion étrangère), and Colonial infantry and artillery units (both French and Senegalese). Both Army of the Levant and Special Troops were responsible for keeping order in the French mandate during the interwar period.

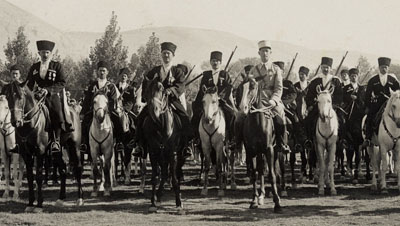
Circassian cavalry serving as part of the Army of the Levant, with their commander Colonel Philibert Collet.

=== Army ===
The French mandate administration followed a principle of divide and rule in organising the Troupes Speciales. To a large extent Sunni Muslim Arabs, who made up about 65% of the population of Syria, were excluded from serving with the Troupes Speciales, who were drawn mainly from the Druze, Christian, Circassian and 'Alawi minorities. From 1926 to 1939, the Army of the Levant included between 10,000 and 12,000 locally engaged troops organised into: ten battalions of infantry (mostly 'Alawis), four squadrons of cavalry (Druze, Circassian and mixed Syrian), three companies of Camel cavalry (méharistes), engineer, armoured car, and support units.

In addition to the regular units listed above, there were nine companies of Lebanese light infantry (chasseurs libanais) and 22 squadrons of Druze, Circassian, and Kurdish mounted infantry forming the auxiliary troops (Troupes Supplétives). This latter force provided a form of military police (gendarmerie) for internal security purposes and were primarily deployed in the areas of their recruitment. Some of the Lebanese units were trained as ski troops for mountain warfare and wore the berets of the French elite mountain infantry (Chasseurs Alpins).

The Circassian cavalry (Groupement d'escadrons tcherkesses) originated with Muslim refugees from the North Caucasus region who fled Tsarist Russian expansion during the nineteenth century. An estimated 850,000 sought refuge in the Ottoman Empire, of whom 30,000 settled in Syria and served in frontier regions as mounted tribal irregulars. From this role, they entered into French service after 1920.

By 1938, the Troupes Speciales numbered 10,000, with 306 officers, of whom only 88 were French. The Homs Military Academy (École Militaire) was established at Homs to train Syrian and Lebanese officers and specialist non-commissioned officers (NCOs). French policy continued to favour the recruitment of specific ethnic and religious minority groups. General Charles Huntziger, the French military commander in Syria, stated in 1935: "we mustn't forget that the Alawis and Druzes are the only warlike races in our mandate and make first-rate soldiers among whom we recruit our best troupes speciales".

=== Auxiliaries ===
Units of gendarmerie, mobile guards and rural guards were deployed for domestic security purposes in specific regions (Grand Liban, Aleppo and Damascus). The Gendarmerie Syrienne numbered approximately 2,600 indigenous personnel with about 50 French officers and specialists.

=== Naval ===
When Admiral Henri du Couëdic de Kerérant took command in June 1924, the Naval Division of the Levant (DNL) was mainly composed of the command ship, the armoured cruiser Waldeck-Rousseau, three armed warships, Bethune, Baccarat and Mondement and two gunboats Agile and Dedaigneuse. The Waldeck-Rousseau was recalled to France at the end of the year to be disarmed, due to budgetary restrictions. It was not replaced, but a number of other ships, including the Jeanne d'Arc compensated for this decreased French presence in the Levant.

The Levant Naval Division's area of operation included the eastern Mediterranean, the Sea of Marmara and the Straits, as well as the Black Sea, the Red Sea and the Gulf of Aden (aviso Diana) A naval commander headed land services in Beirut; reporting, in peacetime, to the admiral commanding the Naval Division of the Levant and, in wartime, to the High Commissioner of the Levant.

== Uniforms and insignia ==
Uniforms of the Troupes Speciales varied according to arm of service but showed a mixture of French and Levantine influences. Indigenous personnel wore either the keffiyeh headdress (red for Druze and white for other units), fezzes or turbans. The Circassian mounted troops wore a black full dress that closely resembled that of the Caucasian Cossacks, complete with astrakhan hats (see photograph above).

A common feature across the Troupes Speciales was the use of "violette" (purple-red) as a facing colour on tunic collar patches, belts and kepis. Squadron or branch insignia often included regional landmarks such as the cedars of Lebanon or the main mosque of Damascus.

== World War II ==
On 22 June, after the Fall of France, the forces in the Levant sided with the Vichy Government of Marshal Philippe Pétain. In 1941, British Commonwealth, Free French and other Allied forces launched Operation Exporter, the Syria–Lebanon campaign. They attacked the Army of the Levant from the British Mandate of Palestine and from the Kingdom of Iraq, recently occupied during the Anglo-Iraqi War. On 8 June 1941 at 2 am, British, Australian, and Free French forces crossed into Syria and Lebanon.

=== French command ===
During Operation Exporter, the Army of the Levant was commanded by General Henri Dentz. Dentz was also the high commissioner of the Levant. Lieutenant-General Joseph-Antoine-Sylvain-Raoul de Verdillac was second in command at the time of the British invasion.

=== French Army ===
In 1941 the Army of the Levant was still divided into troops from metropolitan France, colonial troops, and the Special Troops of the Levant (French: Troupes spéciales du Levant).

The regular French troops consisted of four battalions of the 6th Foreign Infantry Regiment 6^{e} REI (according to Dentz, these were the best troops available to the Vichy French command) and three battalions of the 24th Colonial Infantry Regiment (French regulars enlisted for overseas service). The latter were brought up to strength by amalgamating them with two garrison battalions of Senegalese troops to form a mixed colonial regiment (régiment mixte coloniale).

The troupes spéciales were formed by eleven battalions of infantry: three Lebanese light infantry battalions (French: bataillons de chasseurs libanais) and eight Syrian battalions (bataillons de Levant). In addition, there were two artillery groups and supporting units. The troupes spéciales included at least 5,000 cavalry organized into squadrons of around 100 men each. Included in the cavalry were 15 squadrons of Circassian cavalry, three of them motorized. The troupes spéciales were led by indigenous officers and non-commissioned officers with a small cadre of French officers.

The African troops comprised six Algerian, three Tunisian, three Senegalese, and one Moroccan rifle (tirailleur) battalions.

The contingent of North African cavalry consisted of the 4th Tunisian, the 1st Moroccan, and the 8th Algerian spahis and amounted to about 7,000 Arab and Berber troopers with mostly French officers. Most were on horseback or in light trucks, while a few were equipped with armoured cars. There was also a mechanized cavalry element provided by the 6th and 7th African light horse (Chasseurs d' Afrique) which totalled 90 tanks (mostly Renault R-35s with a few Renault FTs) and a similar number of armoured cars.

The artillery available to the Vichy French consisted of 120 field and medium guns and numbered about 6,700 men.

=== French Air Forces ===
The Vichy French Air Force (French: Armée de l'Air de Vichy) of the French Air Force in the Levant was relatively strong at the outbreak of hostilities in 1939. But in 1940, many of the aircraft stationed in Syria and Lebanon were sent back to Metropolitan France. This left the Vichy French in the Levant with only a number of obsolete models. However, alarmed by the growing threat of British invasion, Vichy dispatched a fighter group from Algeria. Once the fighting started, three additional groups were flown in from France and from North Africa. This brought the strength of the Vichy French Air Force in Lebanon and Syria up to 289 aircraft, including about 35 state-of-the-art Dewoitine D.520 fighters and some new, US-built Glenn Martin 167 light bombers. This initially gave the Vichy French an edge over the Allied air units. But the loss of Vichy French aircraft was very high: 179 aircraft were lost during the campaign, most destroyed on the ground.

=== French Naval Forces ===
Two destroyers and three submarines of the French Navy (Marine Nationale) were available to support the Vichy forces in the Levant.

== Polish Brigade ==
On 12 April 1940, after the invasion and fall of Poland, the Polish Independent Carpathian Rifle Brigade was formed from Polish exiles in the Levant. While not part of the Army of the Levant, the brigade specialized in mountain warfare and was to be the Polish contribution to Allied plans for landings in the Balkans. On 30 June, the brigade was transported to Palestine.

== End of French rule ==
Following the Fall of France in 1940, the French and African components of the Army of the Levant were for the most part repatriated to their territories of origin. A minority (including some Lebanese and Syrians) took the opportunity to join the Free French Forces.

Free French general Georges Catroux took control of Syria after the defeat of the Vichy French. On 26 November 1941, shortly after he took up this post, Catroux recognised the independence of Lebanon and Syria in the name of Free France. Even so, a period of military occupation followed. On 8 November 1943, after elections, Lebanon became an independent state. On 27 February 1945, Lebanon declared war on Nazi Germany and the Empire of Japan. On 1 January 1944, Syria followed Lebanon and also became an independent state. On 26 February 1945, Syria declared war on Nazi Germany and the Empire of Japan.

The troupes spéciales remained in existence during the military occupation, still under French authority, until August 1945. Most then transferred to the new Syrian Army. The founders of the post-independence Lebanese Army had trained as officers in the troupes spéciales.

== See also ==
- 1936 Syrian general strike
- Army of Africa (France)
- French Colonial Empire
- French colonial flags
- French Colonial Forces
- History of the Armée de l'Air (1909–1942)
- History of the Armée de l'Air (colonial presence 1939–1962)
- League of Nations
- Levant Crisis
- List of French possessions and colonies
- Partitioning of the Ottoman Empire
- Syria-Lebanon campaign
- Tomb of the Unknown Soldier (Lebanon)
- Vichy French Air Force
