= Paul Legentilhomme =

French Army general (1884-1975)

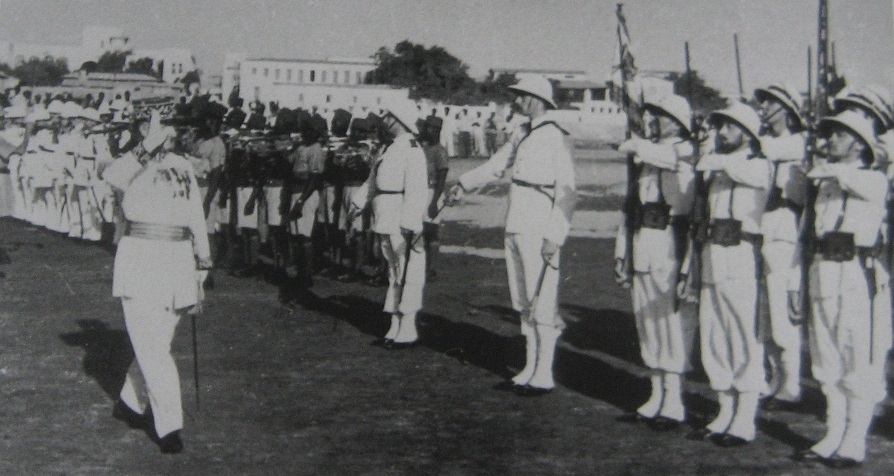
- General Legentilhomme in French Somaliland, 1939 or 1940
- Born: March 26, 1884; Valognes, France
- Died: May 23, 1975 (aged 91); Villefranche-sur-Mer, France
- Military career
- Allegiance: France; Free French Forces
- Service years: 1907–1950
- Rank: Général d'armée
- Conflicts: World War I World War II
- Awards: Grand Cross of the Légion of Honor; Compagnon de la Libération; Médaille Militaire; Croix de Guerre 1914–1918; Croix de Guerre 1939–1945; Commander of the Order of the Bath; Commander of the Legion of Merit
- Other work: French Minister Advisor

Paul Louis Legentilhomme (March 26, 1884 – May 23, 1975) was an officer in the French Army during World War I and World War II. After the fall of France in 1940, he joined the forces of the Free French. Legentilhomme was a recipient of the Order of the Liberation.

== History ==
Legentilhomme was born on March 26, 1884, in Valognes, Manche. He was a cadet at the École Spéciale Militaire de Saint-Cyr 1905 to 1907 (promotion "la Dernière du vieux Bahut"). He was promoted to sub-lieutenant in 1907 and to lieutenant in 1909.

His unit took part in the battle of Neufchâteau in Belgium, on August 22, 1914, and he was captured by the Germans. He spent 1914 to 1918 in German captivity. In 1918 he was promoted to captain.

He was promoted to major in 1924. From 1926 to 1928 he was chief of staff in Madagascar. He was promoted to lieutenant colonel in 1929. From 1929 to 1931 he was chief of staff, 3rd Colonial Division. In 1934 he was promoted to colonel. From 1937 to 1938 he was commanding officer 4th Senegalese Tirailleurs Regiment. In 1938 he was promoted to brigadier-general.

=== WWII ===
1939 to 1940 he was commander in chief of the French military units stationed in French Somaliland (present day Djibouti). On June 18, 1940, in Djibouti, the capital of French Somaliland, Legentilhomme condemned the French armistice and declared his intention to continue the war with the British Empire. He declared this in his "General Order Number 4". On August 2, 1940 he left French Somaliland (Vichy French until 1942) and went to the United Kingdom. On October 31, 1940 he was stripped of his French citizenship by the Vichy government.

In 1941 Legentilhomme was promoted to major general in the Free French Army and returned to East Africa as the Commander-in-Chief of the Free French Forces in the Sudan and Eritrea. As part of Brigadier Harold Rawdon Briggs' Briggsforce, Free French forces participated in the East African campaign. Legentilhomme worked under the supreme command of Field Marshal Archibald Wavell, 1st Earl Wavell. He created the First French light division or 1st Free French Division (in French "1ère Division légère française libre" or "1ère DLFL"). He commanded the 1st Free French Division and Gentforce during Syria–Lebanon campaign and was Commander in Chief of Free French forces in Africa. Gentforce, named after Legentilhomme, was formed on 12 June 1941, four days after the campaign began on 8 June. Its objective was to advance from Palestine along the Damascus road through Quneitra and Kissoué. Legentilhomme was wounded almost immediately after taking command of the unified force, on 12 June according to some sources and 14 June according to others, and was succeeded temporarily by Brigadier Wilfrid Lewis Lloyd of the 5th Indian Infantry Brigade. Despite his wound, Legentilhomme recovered in time to enter Damascus in a car alongside General Georges Catroux when the city fell to Allied forces on 21 June 1941, with a Vichy French Circassian cavalry escort. The Armistice of Saint Jean d'Acre ending the campaign was signed on 14 July 1941. In November Legentilhomme was condemned in his absence for treason by the Government of Vichy and sentenced to the death penalty.

In 1942 he was awarded the Compagnon de la Libération cross by General Charles de Gaulle on 9 September 1942, and became High Commissioner of the French possessions in the Indian Ocean as well as Governor-General of Madagascar and general Officer Commander in Chief Madagascar.

In 1943 he became a member of the Empire Defense Council, and was nominated to be Lieutenant General and Commissaire to the French Committee for National Liberation. For 1944 to 1945 he was General Officer Commanding 3rd Military Region (France). From 1945 to 1946 he was General Officer Commanding Paris Military Region.

=== Post WWII ===
For 1945 to 1947 he was Military Governor of Paris. For 1946 to 1947 he was General Officer Commanding 1st Military Region. In 1947 he was promoted to Army General and retired that year.

In 1950 he was military advisor of the Minister for French overseas departments and territories. In 1952 he was technical advisor of the Minister François Mitterrand (who much later was President of the French Republic between 1981 and 1995). For 1952 to 1958 he was member of the Assemblée de l'Union française for the UDSR political party (in French).

Paul Legentilhomme died at age 91 on 23 May 1975 in Villefranche-sur-Mer, France, and was buried there.

== Honour ==
- Grand Cross of the Légion of Honor
- Compagnon de la Libération
- Médaille militaire
- Croix de guerre 1914–1918
- Croix de guerre 1939–1945
- Knight of the Order of the Dragon of Annam
- Commander of the Order of the Bath (GB)
- Commander of the Legion of Merit (USA)

== See also ==
- Battle of Madagascar
