= Henri Dentz =

French general

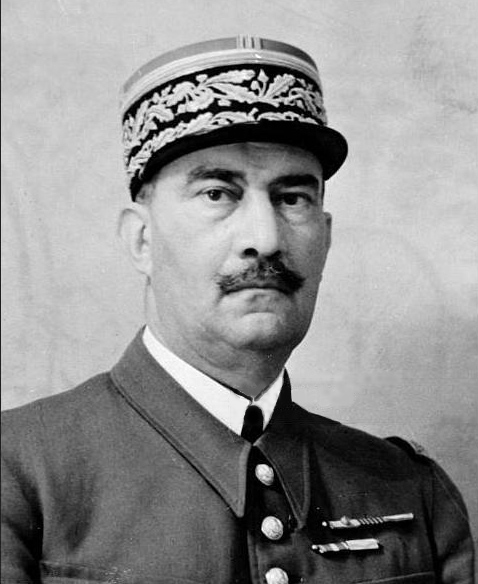
- Henri Dentz in 1940

High Commissioner of the Levant
- In office 1940–1941
- Preceded by: Jean Chiappe
- Succeeded by: Georges Catroux as General Delegate of Free France in the Levant

Personal details
- Born: Henri Fernand Dentz; 16 December 1881 Roanne, Loire, France
- Died: 13 December 1945 (aged 63) Fresnes Prison, Fresnes, France
- Awards: Grand Officer of the Legion of Honour; Croix de Guerre 1914–1918; Croix de Guerre (Vichy)

Military service
- Allegiance: France; Vichy France
- Branch/service: French Army; Vichy French Army
- Years of service: 1898–1943
- Rank: Général d'armée
- Commands: Army of the Levant; 12th Army Corps; 15th Army Corps; 54th Infantry Regiment
- Battles/wars: First World War; Second World War: Battle of France; Syria–Lebanon Campaign

Henri Fernand Dentz (French pronunciation: [ɑ̃ʁi fɛʁnɑ̃ dɛnts]; 16 December 1881 – 13 December 1945) was a general in the French Army (Armée de Terre) who served with the Vichy French Army after France surrendered during the Second World War. He was tried as a collaborator after the war.

== Early life ==
On 16 December 1881, Henri Dentz was born in Roanne, Loire, France.

== Military career ==
=== Syria-Lebanon campaign ===
In April 1941, the Vichy government appointed Dentz as the High Commissioner of the Levant.

As Commander in Chief of the Army of the Levant (Armée du Levant) and as High Commissioner of the Levant, Dentz was in charge of the defence of the French Mandate of Syria and the French Mandate of Lebanon in the Middle East. Dentz commanded an army of approximately 45,000 men.

Vichy authorities allowed aircraft from the German Air Force and the Italian Royal Air Force to refuel in Syria and Lebanon before and during the Anglo-Iraqi War. After this, the Allies planned an invasion of the French mandates.

On 8 June 1941, a force of approximately 20,000 Australian, Indian, Free French, and British troops, under the command of Sir Henry M. Wilson, invaded Syria and Lebanon from the British Mandate of Palestine and from Iraq. Fierce fighting ensued and the Vichy forces under Dentz progressively lost ground over a 13-day period. Damascus, the capital of Syria, was abandoned on 21 June 1941.

Fighting continued in Lebanon but the Vichy forces continued to lose ground. By July, the Australians were nearing Beirut. The fall of Beirut, the capital of Lebanon, meant the end was near. On 10 July 1941, as the Australian 21st Brigade was on the verge of entering Beirut, Dentz sought an armistice. At one minute past midnight on 12 July 1941, a ceasefire went into effect. During the ceasefire, Dentz ordered his troops the retreat to Tripoli, Lebanon and then ships and aircraft went to Turkey where they were interned.

For all intents and purposes, the ceasefire on 10 July 1941 ended the campaign. An armistice, known as the Armistice of Saint Jean d'Acre, was signed on 14 July 1941. There were 37,736 Vichy French prisoners of war who survived the conflict after fighting for Dentz. Most chose to be repatriated to Metropolitan France rather than join the Free French.

== Aftermath and death ==
In January 1945, Dentz was sentenced to death for aiding the Axis powers. But Charles de Gaulle, the President of the Provisional Government of the French Republic (gouvernement provisoire de la République française, or GPRF), commuted his sentence to life imprisonment. However, Dentz was not to serve much of this sentence. On 13 December 1945, he died of heart problems in Fresnes, Val-de-Marne, France.

== Command history ==
- 1934 to 1937 Commanding Officer, 54th Brigade
- 1937 to 1939 Deputy Chief, General Staff Army
- 1939 Assistant Chief General Staff, Army
- 1939 General Officer Commanding, XV Corps
- 1939 to 1940 General Officer Commanding, XII Corps
- 1940 General Officer Commanding, Paris Military region
- 1940 General Officer Commanding, 15th Military Region
- 1940 General Officer Commanding, 15th Military Division
- 1940 to 1941 General Officer Commander in Chief, Levant
- 1941 High Commissioner of Levant
- 1941 to 1942 High Commissioner of Levant supervising repatriation of the Forces of Levant
- 1942 to 1943 President of the Commission of Conferment of Awards of 1939–1940
- 1945 Arrested
- 1945 Condemned to death as collaborationist
- 1945 Sentence changed to life imprisonment
- 1945 Died in prison
