= Indian Army during World War II =

Indian Army
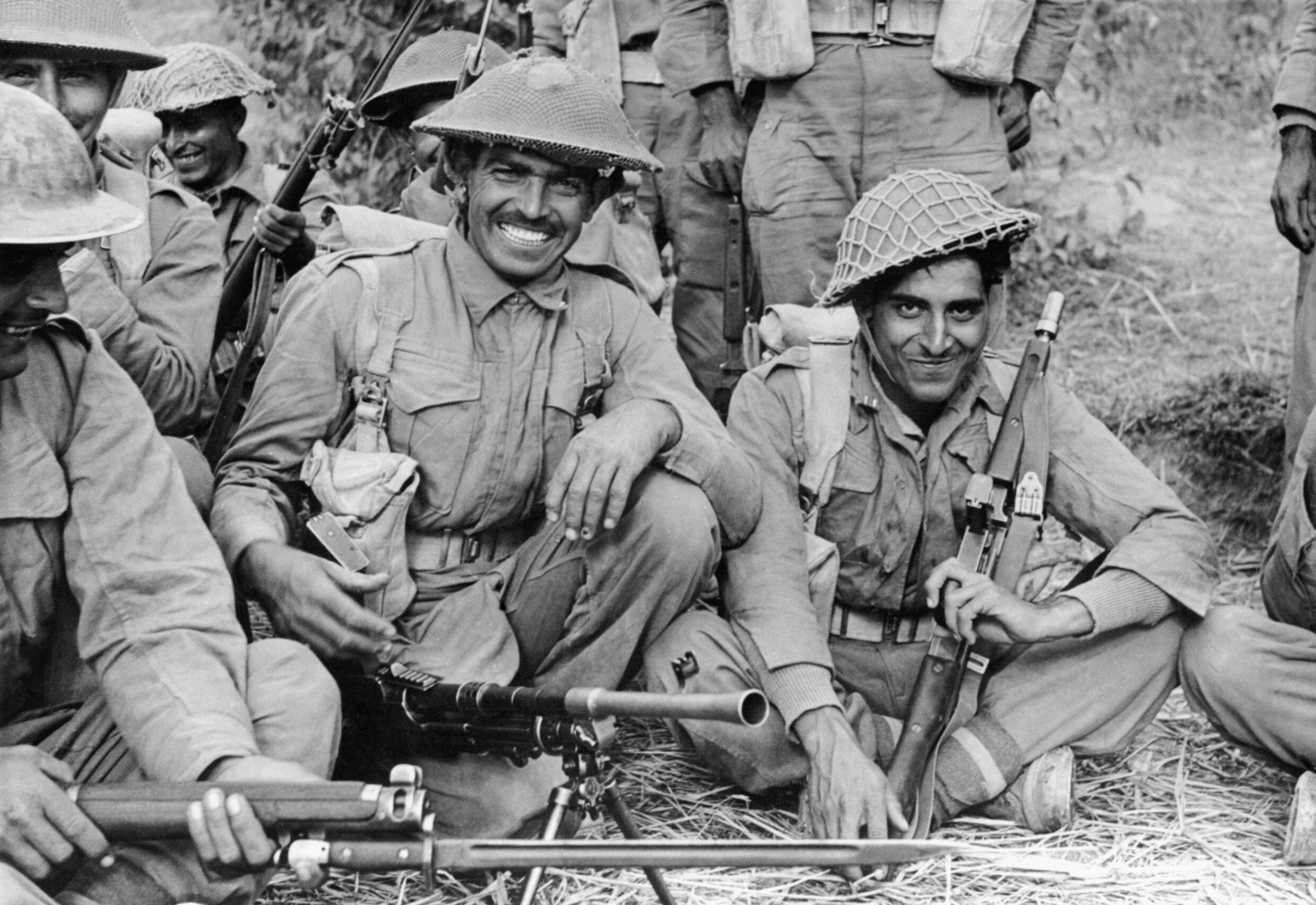
- Indian troops of the Rajput Regiment in Arakan during the Burma campaign, c. 1944
- Active: 1895–1947
- Country: India
- Allegiance: British Empire
- Type: Army
- Size: 2.5 million men
- Headquarters: GHQ India (Delhi)

Commanders
- Notable commanders: Archibald Wavell, 1st Earl Wavell; Claude Auchinleck

The Indian Army during World War II, a British force also referred to as the British Indian Army, began the war in 1939, numbering just under 200,000 men. By the end of the war, it had become the largest volunteer army in history, rising to over 2.5 million men in August 1945. Serving in divisions of infantry, armor and a fledgling airborne force, they fought in Africa, Europe and Asia.

The army fought in Ethiopia against the Italian Army, in Egypt, Libya, Tunisia and Algeria against both the Italian and German armies, and, after the Italian surrender, against the German Army in Italy. However, the bulk of the Indian Army was committed to fighting the Japanese Army, first during the British defeat in Malaya and the retreat from Burma to the Indian border; later, after resting and refitting for the victorious advance back into Burma, as part of the largest British Empire army ever formed. These campaigns cost the lives of over 87,000 Indian servicemen, while 34,354 were wounded, and 67,340 became prisoners of war. Their valour was recognised with the award of some 4,000 decorations, and 18 members of the Indian Army were awarded the Victoria Cross or the George Cross. Field Marshal Claude Auchinleck, Commander-in-Chief of the Indian Army from 1942, asserted that the British "couldn't have come through both wars (World War I and II) if they hadn't had the Indian Army." British Prime Minister Winston Churchill also paid tribute to "The unsurpassed bravery of Indian soldiers and officers."

== Background ==
In 1939, the Indian Army was an experienced British force, having fought in the Third Afghan War, two major campaigns in Waziristan, during 1919–1920 and 1936–1939, and in several smaller disputes on the North West Frontier since the First World War. There was no shortage of manpower to call upon, but the army did suffer from a shortage of skilled technical personnel. The conversion of the cavalry force into a mechanised tank force had only just begun and was hampered by the inability to supply adequate numbers of tanks and armoured vehicles.

In 1939, British officials had no plan for expansion and training of Indian forces, which comprised about 130,000 men (in addition, there were 44,000 men in British units in India in 1939). Their mission was internal security and defence against a possible Russian threat through Afghanistan. As the war progressed, the size and role of the Indian Army expanded dramatically, and troops were sent to battle fronts as soon as possible. The most serious problem was lack of equipment.

== Organisation ==
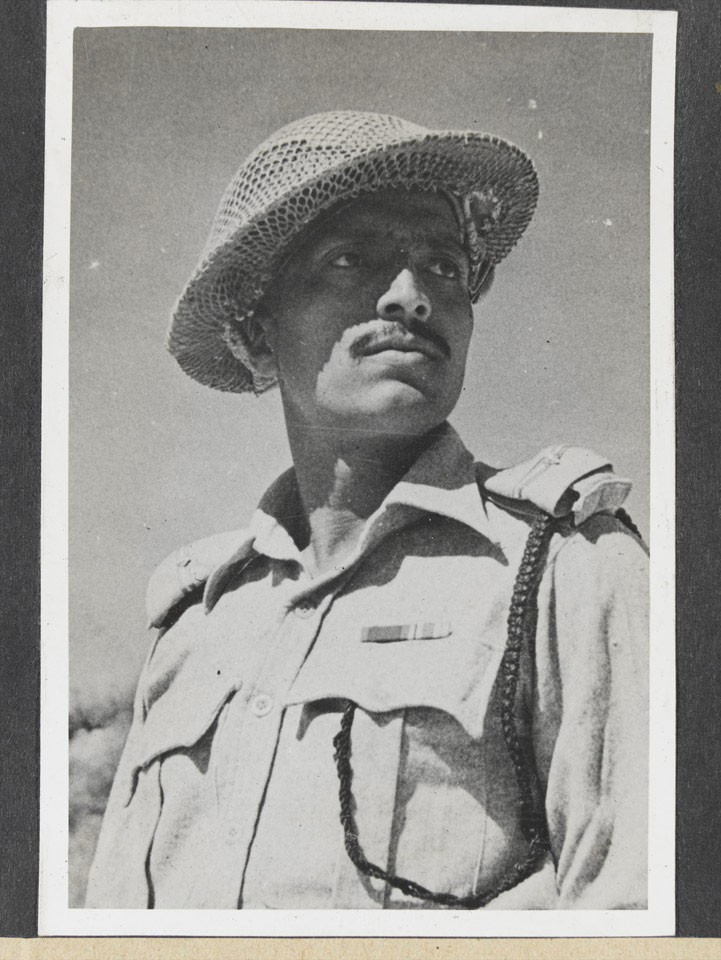
Subedar (VCO Captain) Chawan of 3rd Battalion, 5th Mahratta Infantry, 1943. His battalion had served in North Africa between 1941-1943 before taking part in the invasion of Italy. His unit was involved in the crossing of the Sangro, the advance to Florence, the breaking of the Gothic Line and the engagements at Alpe de Vitigliano and the River Senio.

The Indian Army of 1939 was different from the Indian Army during World War I (also a British force); it had been reformed in 1922, moving away from single battalion regiments to multi-battalion regiments. Overall, the army was reduced to 21 cavalry regiments and 107 infantry battalions. The field army now consisted of four infantry divisions and five cavalry brigades. There was a covering force of 12 infantry brigades to protect the North West Frontier from incursions and one third of the infantry, 43 battalions, were allocated to internal security and to aid the civil power. In the 1930s, the Indian Army began a programme of modernisation—they now had their own artillery—the Indian Artillery Regiment—and the cavalry had started to mechanise. By 1936, the Indian Army had committed to supplying in wartime a brigade each for Singapore, the Persian Gulf, the Red Sea, Burma and two for Egypt. But, by 1939, further reductions had reduced the Indian Army to 18 cavalry regiments and 96 infantry battalions, in total 194,373 men including 34,155 non-combatants. They could also call upon 15,000 men from the Frontier Irregular Force, 22,000 men from the Auxiliary Force (India), consisting of European and Anglo-Indian volunteers, 19,000 from the Indian Territorial Force, and 53,000 from the Indian State forces.

There were twenty two regular regiments of cavalry, which supplied tank and armoured car units. (Seven more were raised during the war.) There were twenty regular Indian regiments of infantry (including the Burma Rifles) and ten Gurkha regiments. Before the war, all the Indian regiments had at least two battalions, and most had more. The Gurkha regiments had two battalions each. During the war, the Gurkha regiments raised a further two battalions each, while the Indian regiments raised up to fifteen each. Two further regiments (the Assam Regiment and the Burma Regiment) were created during the war.

The Indian Army started World War II underprepared and short of modern weapons and equipment. It had not expected to be involved in any hostilities and had been advised after the outbreak of war in Europe, by the British government, that it was unlikely to be required at all. So, it was with some surprise when the 4th Infantry and 5th Infantry divisions were requested to serve in the North African and East African campaigns and four mule companies to join the British Expeditionary Force in France.

=== 1940 ===
In May 1940, agreement was reached between the British and Indian governments over the formation of another five infantry and one armoured divisions, which became the 6th, 7th, 8th, 9th, 10th infantry and the 31st Armoured divisions. These new divisions were primarily intended to be used in the defence of Malaya (9th Division) and Iraq (6th, 8th and 10th Infantry divisions). The 3rd Indian Motor Brigade, from the armoured division, was to go to Egypt; the formation of the rest of the armoured division was put on hold, because of the shortage of armoured vehicles.

=== 1941 ===
In March 1941, the Indian government revised the defence plan for India. Concerned with what the Japanese were planning and the requirement to replace the divisions sent overseas, seven new armoured regiments and 50 new infantry battalions were needed for five new infantry divisions that were formed: the 14th, 17th, 19th, 20th, 34th and the two armoured formations 32nd Indian Armoured Division and 50th Indian Tank Brigade.

=== 1942 ===
With the fall of Singapore in 1942, about 40,000 Indian soldiers were captured. They were given a choice; 30,000 joined the Indian National Army. Those who refused became POWs and were mostly shipped to New Guinea.

With the previously formed divisions mostly committed overseas in 1942, the army formed another four infantry divisions (23rd, 25th, 28th, 36th) and the 43rd Indian Armoured Division. However, events during 1942 and the Japanese conquests meant that the 28th Division was not formed and the units earmarked for it were used elsewhere. The 36th Division, uniquely, was created as an Indian Army formation, but was formed from British brigades that had reached India from the Madagascar campaign and from Britain. The final division formed in 1942 was the 26th Indian Infantry Division, which was hastily formed from the various units in training or stationed near Calcutta.

After the perceived poor performance in battles in Malaya and Burma in 1942, it was decided that the existing infantry divisions were over–mechanised. To counter this, the 17th and 39th divisions were selected to become light divisions, of only two brigades which would rely more on animal and four-wheel-drive transport.

By December 1942, agreement was reached that India should become the base for offensive operations. Support should be in place for 34 divisions, which would include two British, one West African, one East African and eleven Indian divisions, and what was left of the Burma Army.

=== 1943 ===
The plans for 1943 included the formation of another infantry division, an airborne division and a heavy armoured brigade. Only the 44th Indian Armoured Division was formed, by amalgamating the 32nd and 43rd Armoured divisions. There was a change to the establishment of infantry divisions, which received two extra infantry battalions as divisional troops.

A committee was set up in 1943 to report on the readiness of the army and suggest improvements. Its recommendations were:

1. The infantry should have first claims on cadet officers and educated recruits, the quality of officers and non commissioned officers (NCO) should be improved and there should be an increase in pay.
2. Basic training should be increased to nine months followed by two months' specialised jungle training.
3. The reinforcement system should be improved and drafts should include experienced NCO's
4. Infantry brigades should include a British, an Indian and a Gurkha battalion.

To assist in the jungle training of the infantry from July 1943, the 14th and 39th divisions were converted to training divisions. The 116th Indian Infantry Brigade, part of 39th Division, provided the specialised jungle conversion training. An infantry battalion would spend from four to six months with the brigade, before being sent to the front to replace a tired battalion in one of the fighting divisions. The brigades and units of the 14th Division provided jungle training for drafts of reinforcements for the Indian battalions already serving on the Burma front.

=== 1944 ===
The planned 44th Indian Airborne Division was finally formed from the 44th Armoured Division, leaving the 31st Armoured as the only armoured division in the army. The infantry division formation was changed again; it was now standardised as three infantry brigades plus three infantry battalions assigned as divisional troops.

The success of the 116th Brigade in training for jungle warfare was recognised. From May 1944, 116th Brigade trained units destined for the Fourteenth Army and 150th Brigade, which was converted from the Risalpur Training Brigade, trained units destined for the Southern Army. The 155th Indian Infantry Brigade was formed to provide training for units destined for the western theatres of war.

=== Infantry divisions ===
Infantry divisions consisted of three infantry brigades, of three infantry battalions. Usually, one battalion in each brigade was British and two were Indian or Gurkha. Four brigades were raised consisting entirely of Gurkha battalions. Later in the war, as British infantry reinforcements became more scarce, particularly in the South East Asian Theatre, British battalions in brigades fighting in Burma were replaced by Indian units.

In a division with a standard MT (Mechanical Transport) establishment, the divisional units were a reconnaissance unit provided by a mechanised cavalry regiment, and a heavy machine gun battalion armed with thirty-six Vickers machine guns. (Each Indian infantry regiment raised a machine gun battalion in addition to its infantry battalions.) The divisional artillery consisted of three field artillery regiments with twenty-four 25-pounder guns each, one anti-tank regiment with forty-eight anti-tank guns and one light anti-aircraft regiment with up to fifty-four light anti-aircraft guns. There were three engineer field companies and one engineer field park company, plus signals, medical and transport units.

There were variations on the infantry formation, depending on role. The light divisions (14th, 17th and 39th) as formed in 1942 had only two brigades and lacked much heavy equipment. Transport was provided by six mule and four Jeep companies. This type of division was later dropped. The Animal and Mechanised transport divisions (A & MT) (7th, 20th and 23rd and later the 5th) had a mixture of animal and vehicle transport, as the name suggests. In particular, one of the vehicle-drawn field artillery regiments was replaced by a mountain artillery regiment with twelve 3.7-inch howitzers, carried on mules. The anti-tank and light anti-aircraft regiments were replaced by a single regiment, with two batteries each of anti-tank and anti-aircraft guns. The divisional reconnaissance unit was replaced by a lightly equipped infantry battalion. Another standard infantry battalion provided the HQ Defence unit.

On 27 May 1944, General George Giffard (the commander of 11th Army Group) ordered that all Indian divisions fighting in Burma should adopt the A & MT establishment. Late that year, however, Lieutenant General William Slim (commanding Fourteenth Army) converted two divisions (the 5th and 17th) to a mixed establishment of two motorised brigades and one airportable brigade, in anticipation of mechanised operations in the comparatively open terrain of central Burma. In April 1945, the 20th Division was also converted to a partially motorised establishment by acquiring the vehicles from a British division whose personnel were being withdrawn from Burma.

=== Armoured divisions ===
It was intended to form an armoured division in the plans for 1940, 1941 and 1942. However, the Indian armoured formations suffered from a lack of equipment. The shortage of tanks in 1940 was reflected in the organisation of 31st Armoured Division, which first had one armoured and two motor brigades. At the end of 1940, this was changed to two armoured and one motor brigade. When the 3rd Indian Motor Brigade was sent to Egypt, the British armoured division organisation of two armoured brigades and a Support group was adopted.

In June 1942, the division's establishment was fixed as one armoured and one infantry brigade. The surplus armoured brigades (50th, 254th, 255th and the 267th) became independent brigades and served in the Burma campaign. In March 1943, the shortage of technical staff forced another review of the armoured force and the 32nd and 43rd armoured divisions were amalgamated to become the 44th Indian Armoured Division. In March 1944, a further review reduced the armoured force to one division (the 31st Armoured Division serving in the Middle East) and three tank brigades (the 50th, 254th and 255th) serving in Burma.

=== Airborne troops ===
The 50th Independent Indian Parachute Brigade was formed on 29 October 1941, with the British 151st Parachute Battalion, 152nd Indian Parachute Battalion and 153rd Gurkha Parachute Battalion, a medium machine gun company and a medium mortar detachment. The 151st Battalion was later renumbered as the 156th Battalion and returned to Britain and another Gurkha battalion (154th) was formed, but had not joined the brigade when it was heavily involved in the Battle of Sangshak in March 1944.

The headquarters of the 44th Indian Armoured Division was converted in April 1944, to 9th Indian Airborne Division, which was renamed the 44th Airborne Division a few weeks later. After a delay caused by the Japanese invasion of India, the division resumed forming in July. It absorbed the 50th Parachute Brigade, and later two brigades from the disbanding Chindit force The division now consisted of the 50th, 77th Parachute Brigades and 14th Airlanding Brigade, two field artillery regiments, two anti-aircraft regiments and a joint anti-aircraft and anti-tank regiment.

=== Artillery ===
The Royal Artillery still provided some of the artillery required for Indian Army formations, but the Indian Regiment of Artillery had been formed in 1935, initially consisting of four horse–drawn batteries. The regiment was expanded during the war and, by 1945, had formed 10 field artillery regiments, 13 mountain artillery regiments, 10 anti–tank artillery regiments. Three anti–aircraft brigades were formed from the four heavy anti–aircraft artillery regiments and five light anti–aircraft artillery regiments created. For the regiments service during the war, it was granted the title Royal Indian Artillery in 1945.

=== Engineers ===
The Indian Engineers were a part of every division in the army. The engineers corps started the war with two army troops companies, 11 Field Companies and one field park company. Expansion during the war took the totals of engineers to; five army troops companies, 67 Field companies, six independent field squadrons, 20 field park companies and two independent field park squadrons.

=== Women's Auxiliary Corps (India) ===
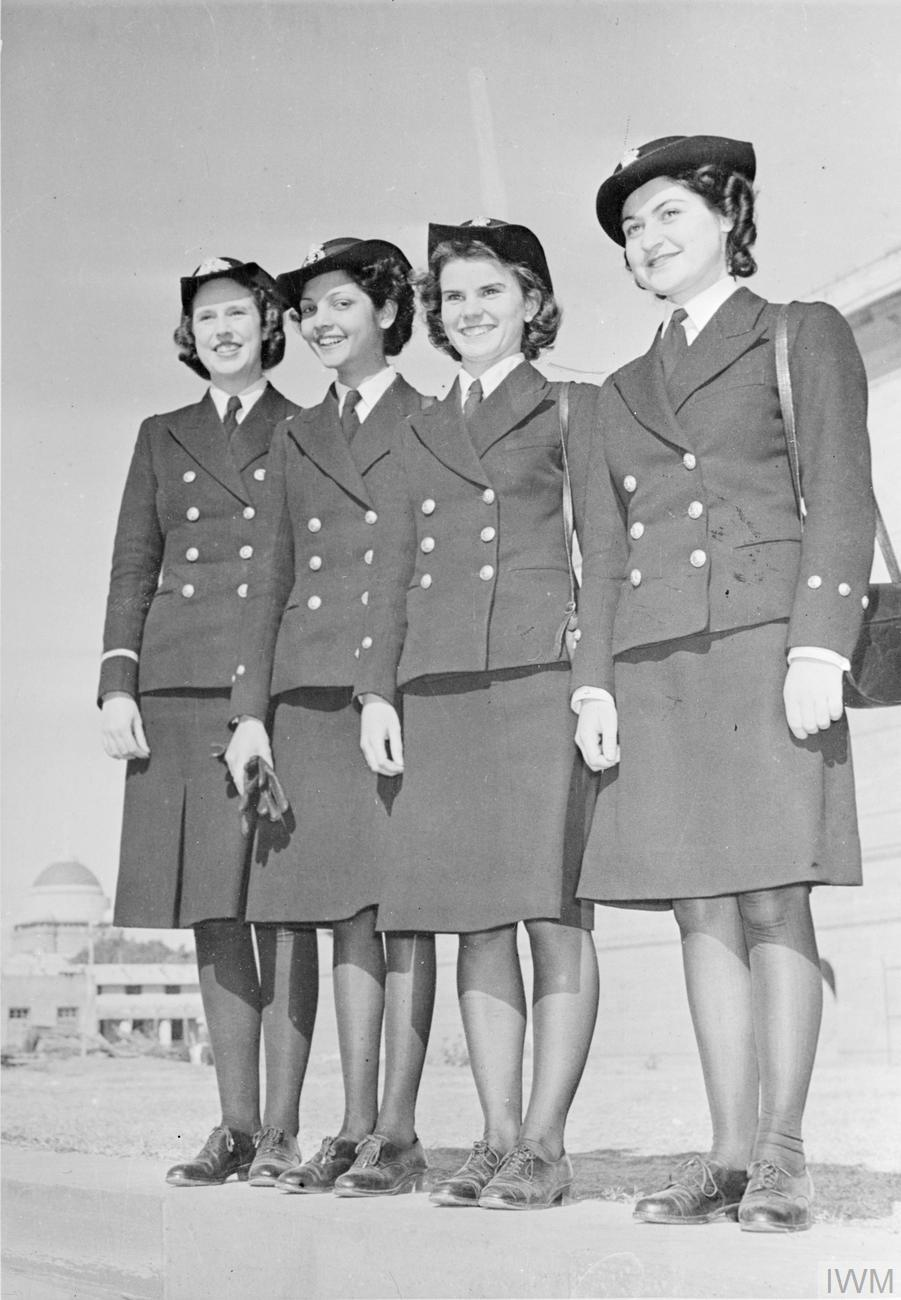
WAC(I) Naval Wing officers

The Women's Auxiliary Corps (India) was formed in May 1942; recruits had to be a minimum age of 18 years and their duties were clerical or domestic. In December 1942, the minimum age was reduced to 17 years and 11,500 women had enlisted by the end of the war. Volunteers could enlist on Local service or General service terms. Those on General service could be sent to serve anywhere in India. Compared to over two million men, the corps of 11,500 women was small, but recruitment was always hampered by caste and communal inhibitions. Indian women at the time did not mix socially or at work with men and a large part of the corps was formed from the mixed-race Anglo–Indian community. The WAC(I) had an autonomous Air Wing, which served as the Indian counterpart of the WAAF: the women operated switchboards and similar duties at airfields and air headquarters (AHQ). In the earlier part of the war there was likewise a Naval Wing, but with the very localised environment of naval base and the very distinct ethos of the wartime naval services, British and Indian, this department was formally hived-off, in 1944, to become: the Women's Royal Indian Naval Service (WRINS), with its own uniform, similar to WRNS.

=== Indian States Forces (ISF) ===
The armies of the Indian States or Princely states provided a further 250,000 men during the war. They contributed five cavalry regiments and 36 infantry battalions, and between them they had 16 infantry battalions plus signal, transport and pioneers companies away on active service. One of their men, Captain Mahmood Khan Durrani, was awarded the George Cross while in Japanese captivity.

=== Chindits ===
The Chindits (named after a mythical beast, statues of which guarded Burmese temples) were the brainchild of Brigadier Orde Wingate, who intended that long-range penetration raids behind enemy lines would become the main effort against the Japanese in Burma. In 1943, he mounted Operation Longcloth by the 77th Indian Infantry Brigade. In 1944, they staged a much larger operation which involved disbanding the 70th British Infantry Division, its three brigades together with three more brigades were grouped as Special Force and referred to for cover purposes as 3rd Indian Infantry Division. In practice, the four Indian Army battalions in Special Force were all from regiments of Gurkha Rifles. There was also a battalion of Burma Rifles, to provide reconnaissance and intelligence gathering. Chindits were in fact ordinary infantry units arbitrarily selected for the mission on the basis of their availability. There was no commando, airborne or other selection procedure, although there was some "weeding out" of less fit personnel during training for operations.

The Chindits were disbanded in February 1945. Several of the brigade headquarters and many of the veterans of the Chindit operations were reformed and merged into 44th Airborne Division, while the force headquarters and signals units formed the core of XXXIV Indian Corps.

=== Recruitment ===
In October 1939 shortly after the outbreak of war the Indian army numbered 205,038 men, initially little recruitment was undertaken as there was no expectation in London for India to contribute largely to a European war and the army grew to around 220,000 by the end of 1939 and by mid-1940 to 228,000 mostly from the 'martial races' namely the Gurkhas and Sikhs. This policy of small increase and of Indian non-commitment was rapidly overturned following the fall of France, London quickly called for the rapid expansion of the Indian army and the army duly grew doubling to 456,000 by the end of 1940 and to 912,000 by the end of 1941 then a further growth to over 1,577,000 by the end of 1942, further growth continued though at a diminishing rate. The total army including auxiliary forces peaked at 2,250,000 men. This was an impressive expansion of military force in a rapid period brought about solely by volunteers and not conscription. However, the British remained prejudiced and favoured their martial race categorisation of troops and deemed that of the 390,000,000 Indians, slightly less than 13,000,000 were intelligent and had the aptitude and sense to become a modern soldier for a modern war, thus only 3% of the adult male population was recruited.

The British recruitment policy however began to break down by mid 1942 as the martial races who were considered the most loyal and able fighters began to not volunteer in the same numbers due to rising demands for labour and higher profit in agriculture. Accordingly, recruits were sourced from beyond the martial races particularly Madras which grew from 3% of the pre-war army to 17% of the wartime army, though they joined not out of patriotism or loyalty but economic necessity as inflation caused by mass printing of money leading to rising prices. This is true especially of the Bengali recruits, whose wages were vastly reduced by inflation. The growth achieved by 1942 proved difficult to maintain as even the martial races of the dogra, Muslim, Sikh, Punjabi and Pathan struggled to fill existing units, though they continued to constitute the bulk of the frontline forces as the non-martial recruits were relegated to rear areas and auxiliary functions. By 1945 the martial races constituted 95% of the infantry, almost all of the armoured formations, artillery formations and air defence formations.

== Armies ==
The Indian Army supplied formations for the following British Empire and Commonwealth armies:

=== Eighth ===
The Eighth Army was formed from the Western Desert Force in September 1941, under the command of Lieutenant General Sir Alan Cunningham. Over time, the Eighth Army would be commanded by Generals Neil Ritchie, Claude Auchinleck and Bernard Montgomery. In the early years of the war, the Eighth Army suffered from poor leadership and repeated reversals of fortune until the Second Battle of El Alamein when it advanced across Libya into Tunisia.

=== Ninth ===
The Ninth Army was formed on 1 November 1941 with the re-designation of the Headquarters of the British Troops in Mandate Palestine and Transjordan. It controlled British and Commonwealth land forces stationed in the eastern Mediterranean. Its commanders were General Sir Henry Maitland Wilson and Lieutenant-General Sir William George Holmes.

=== Tenth ===
The Tenth Army was formed in Iraq and from the major part of Paiforce after the Anglo-Iraqi War. It was active in 1942–1943, under the command of Lieutenant-General Sir Edward Quinan, and consisted of the III Corps and the XXI Indian Corps. Its main task was the maintenance of the lines of communication to the Soviet Union from the Persian Gulf to the Caspian and the protection of the South Persian and Iraqi oilfields that supplied Britain with all its non American sourced oil.

=== Twelfth ===
The Twelfth Army was reformed in May 1945, to take control of operations in Burma from the Fourteenth Army. The army Headquarters was created by re-designating the Headquarters of the XXXIII Indian Corps, under Lieutenant-General Sir Montagu Stopford.

=== Fourteenth ===
The Fourteenth Army was a multinational force comprising units from Commonwealth countries, many of its units were from the Indian Army as well as British units and there were also significant contributions from 81st, 82nd and 11th African divisions. It was often referred to as the "Forgotten Army" because its ongoing operations in the Burma Campaign were largely overlooked by the contemporary press, as the War in Europe drew to a close and even after Victory in Europe (VE), when people took the view the war was over everywhere. It still remained more obscure than those of the corresponding formations in Europe long after the war. The Fourteenth Army was formed in 1943, under the command of Lieutenant General William Slim and was the largest Commonwealth Army during the war, with nearly a million men by late 1944. At various times, four corps were assigned to the army: IV Corps, XV Indian Corps, XXXIII Indian Corps and the XXXIV Indian Corps.

=== Eastern ===
The Eastern Army (India) was formed from Eastern Command in 1942. It served as the rear area command for the Twelfth and Fourteenth Armies. Units being rested or reforming would be posted to this command, as would newly-formed or newly-posted units, being prepared for active service. It provided the training bases and depots, the equipment stores and the lines of communication (LOC) to headquarters. In addition, it provided force protection for the front-line forces, cushioning them from any domestic unrest and from any enemy attack from the rear. Its Commanders-in-Chief included Broad, Irwin and Giffard.

=== Southern ===
The Southern Army was formed from Southern Command in 1942, and disbanded in August 1945. Mostly a British formation used on internal security and for units out of the front line. The 19th Indian Infantry Division was one of its units from 1942 to 1944.

=== North Western ===
The North Western Army was formed from North Western Command in April 1942, formed to guard the North West Frontier it controlled the Kohat, Peshawar, Rawalpindi, Baluchistan and Waziristan Districts.

== Middle East and Africa ==
=== North Africa ===
Just before the declaration of war, one Indian infantry brigade was sent to reinforce the British garrison in Egypt. In October 1939, a second brigade was sent; they were grouped together as the 4th Indian Infantry Division. By March 1940, two additional brigades and a divisional headquarters had been sent to Egypt; these became the 5th Indian Infantry Division.

Operation Compass (4th Indian and 7th Armoured Division) was the first major Allied military operation of the Western Desert Campaign during the Second World War. It resulted in British and Commonwealth forces pushing across a great stretch of Libya and capturing almost all of Cyrenaica, 115,000 Italian soldiers, hundreds of tanks and artillery pieces and more than 1,100 aircraft with very few casualties of their own.

The Allies' success against the Italians forced the Germans to reinforce North Africa. The Afrika Corps commanded by Erwin Rommel attacked in March 1941. The 3rd Indian Motor Brigade, fought a delaying battle at Meikili on 6 April, which allowed the 9th Australian Division to safely withdraw to Tobruk.

Operation Battleaxe (4th Indian and 7th Armoured) in June 1941 had the goal of clearing eastern Cyrenaica of German and Italian forces; one of the main benefits of this would be the lifting of the Siege of Tobruk. The operation did not succeed losing over half of their tanks on the first day and only achieved victory at one out of three thrusts. On the second day, they achieved mixed results, being pushed back on their western flank but repelled a significant German counter-attack in their centre. On the third day, the British narrowly avoided outright disaster by successfully withdrawing just prior to a German encircling movement which would have cut them off from retreat.

Operation Crusader (4th Indian, 7th Armoured, 1st South African, 2nd New Zealand and 70th British divisions) between 18 November–30 December 1941. The initial plan was to destroy the Axis armoured force before advancing its infantry. 7th Armoured were heavily defeated by the Afrika Korps at Sidi Rezegh. Rommel's subsequent advance of his armoured divisions to the Axis fortress positions on the Egyptian border failed to find the main body of the Allied infantry, which had bypassed the fortresses and headed for Tobruk, so Rommel had to withdraw his armoured units to support the fighting at Tobruk. Despite achieving some tactical successes at Tobruk, the need to preserve his remaining forces prompted Rommel to withdraw his army to the defensive line at Gazala, west of Tobruk, and then all the way back to El Agheila.

4th Division left the desert for Cyprus and Syria in April 1942. By May 1942, their 11th Brigade had returned attached to the 5th Indian fighting south of Tobruk. Their 5th Brigade returned in June 1942, and fought at Mersa Matruh. The 10th Indian Infantry Division arrived from Syria, in time to take part in the Battle of Gazala May–June 1942, then held the Axis forces for 72 hours, in the First Battle of El Alamein permitting Eighth Army to safely withdraw. HQ 4th Division returned for the Second Battle of El Alamein, holding Ruweisat Ridge at the centre of the Eighth Army's line, made a mock attack and two small raids intended to deflect attention to the centre of the front.

Operation Pugilist (4th Indian, 2nd New Zealand and 50th Northumbrian divisions) was an operation in the Tunisian Campaign The object of was to destroy the Axis forces in the Mareth Line, and to capture Sfax. Pugilist itself was indecisive and failed to make a decisive breakthrough. It did, however, establish an alternative route of attack and thus laid the ground for Supercharge II, an outflanking manoeuvre via the Tebaga Gap.

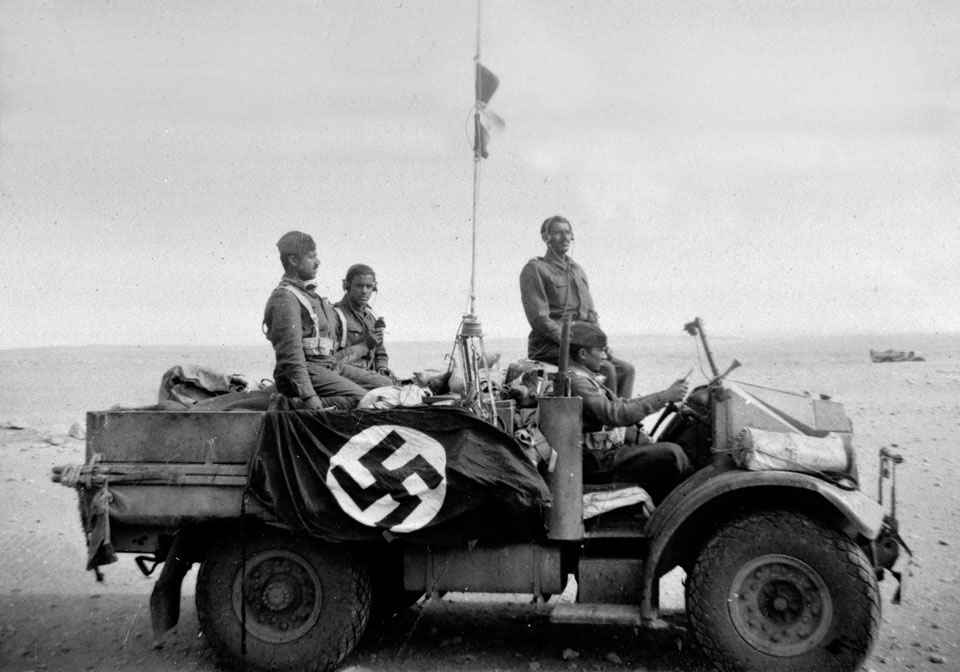
Central Indian Horse after re-occupation of Benghazi

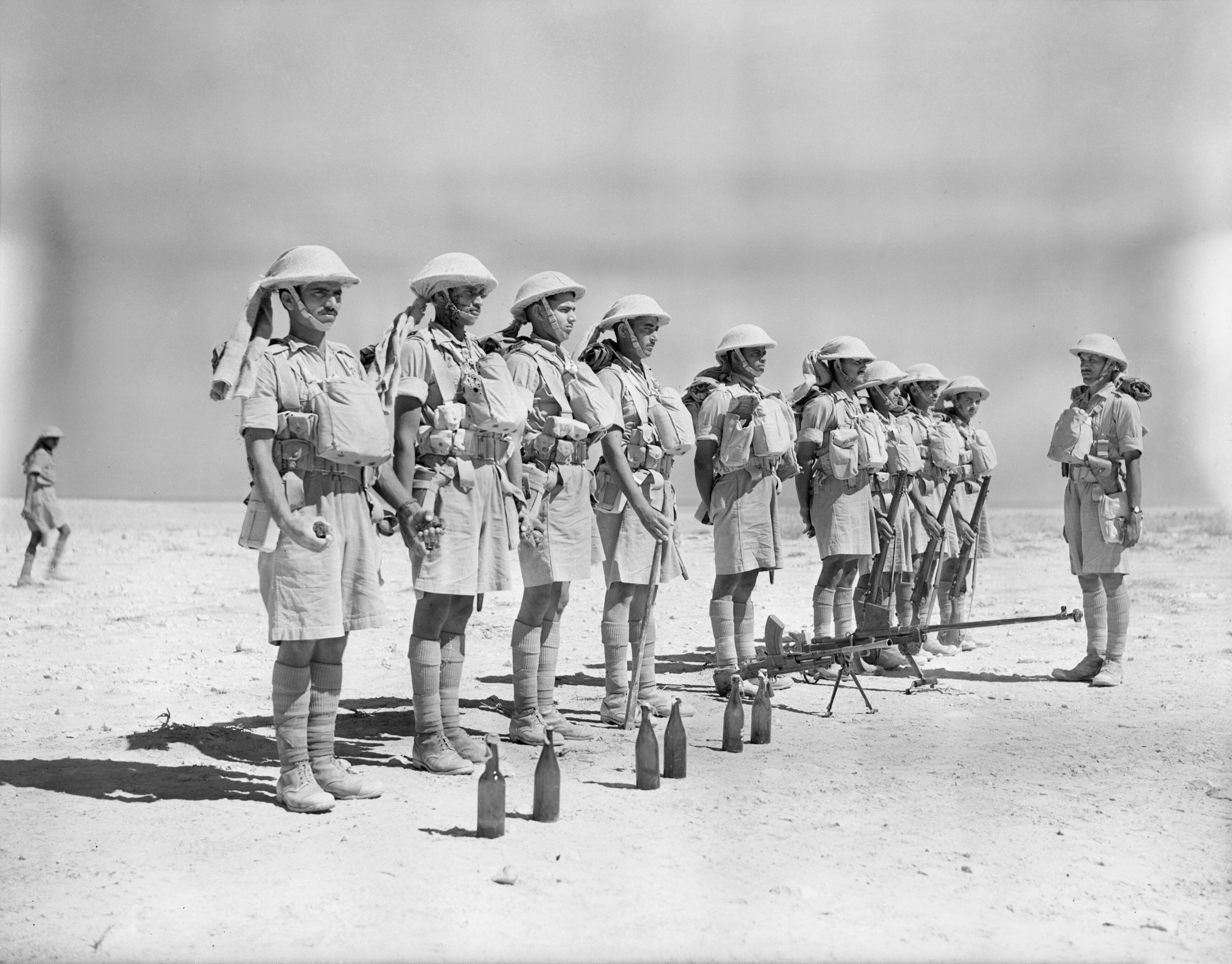
4th Division tank-hunting squad at Mersa Matruh

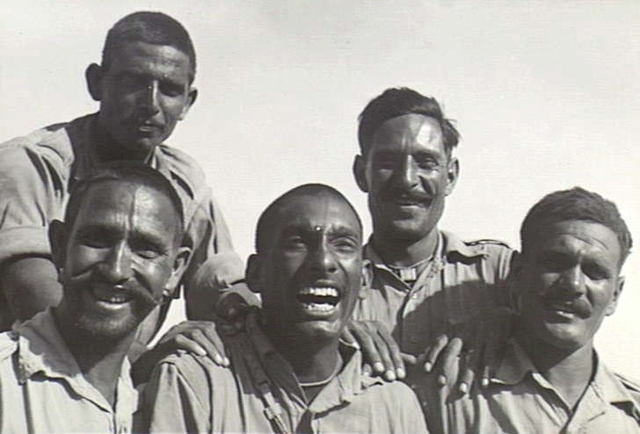
Indian soldiers smile at Tobruk

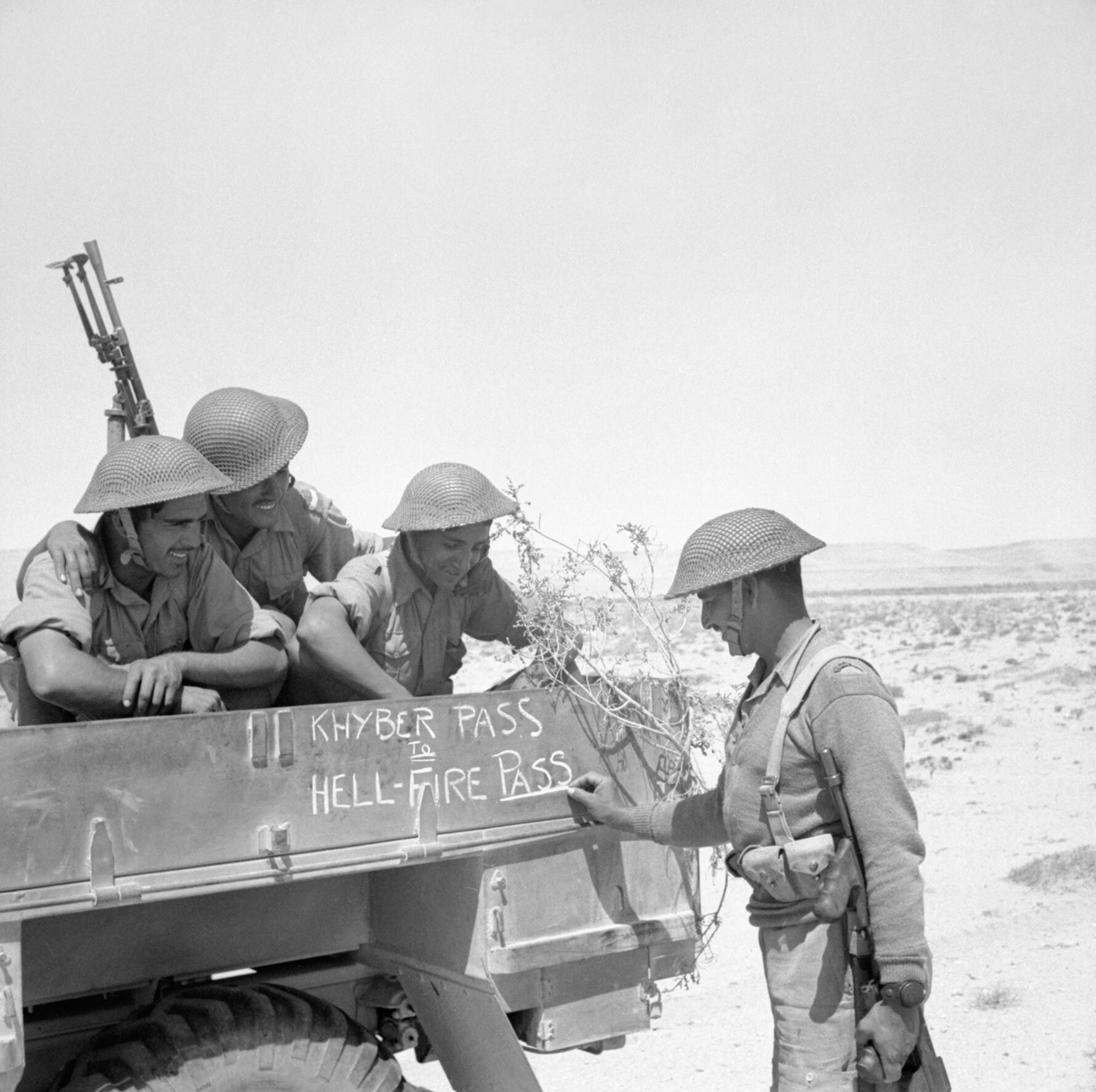
From Khyber Pass to Hellfire Pass, Operation Battleaxe

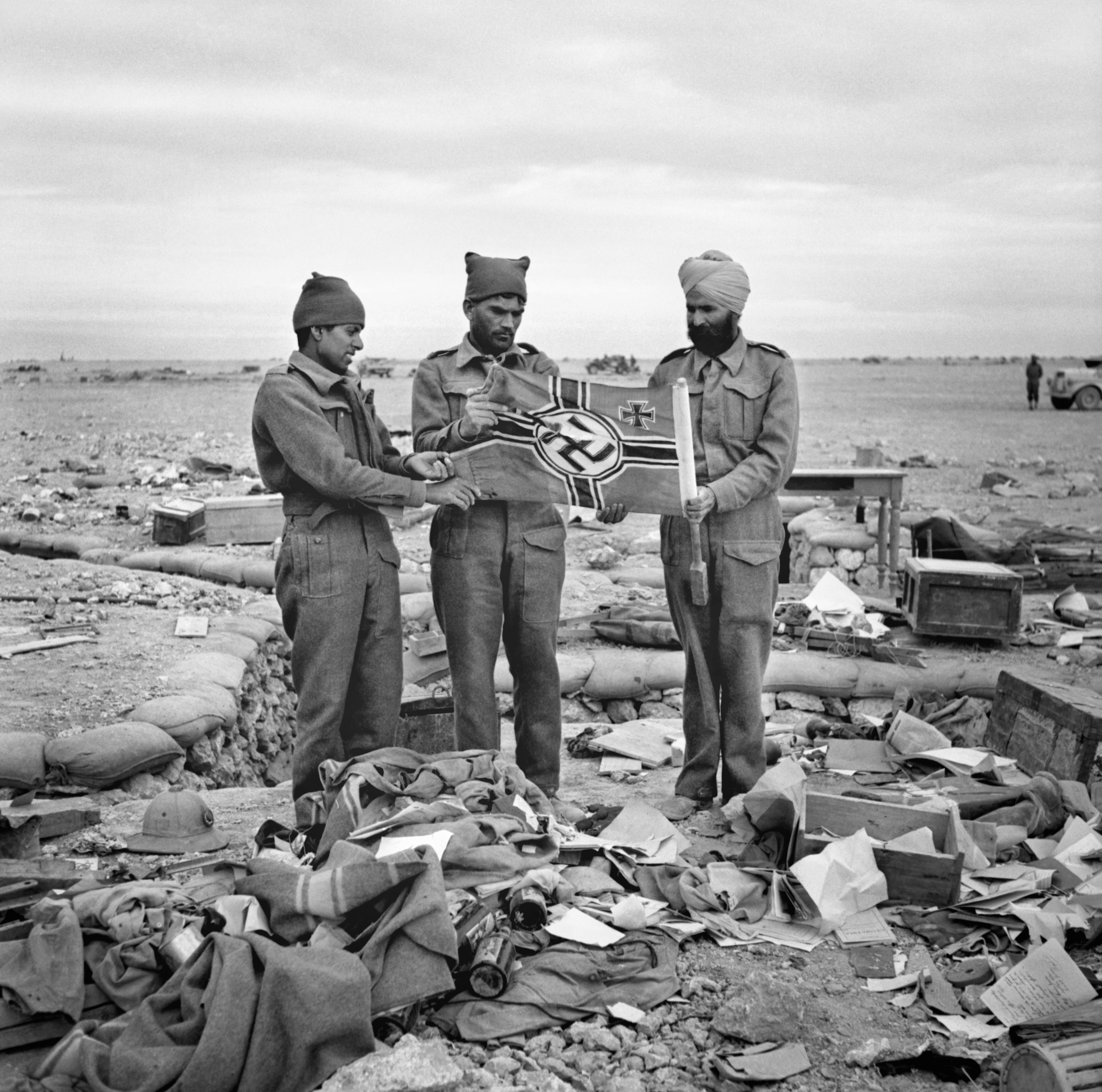
4th Division with captured German flag at Sidi Omar

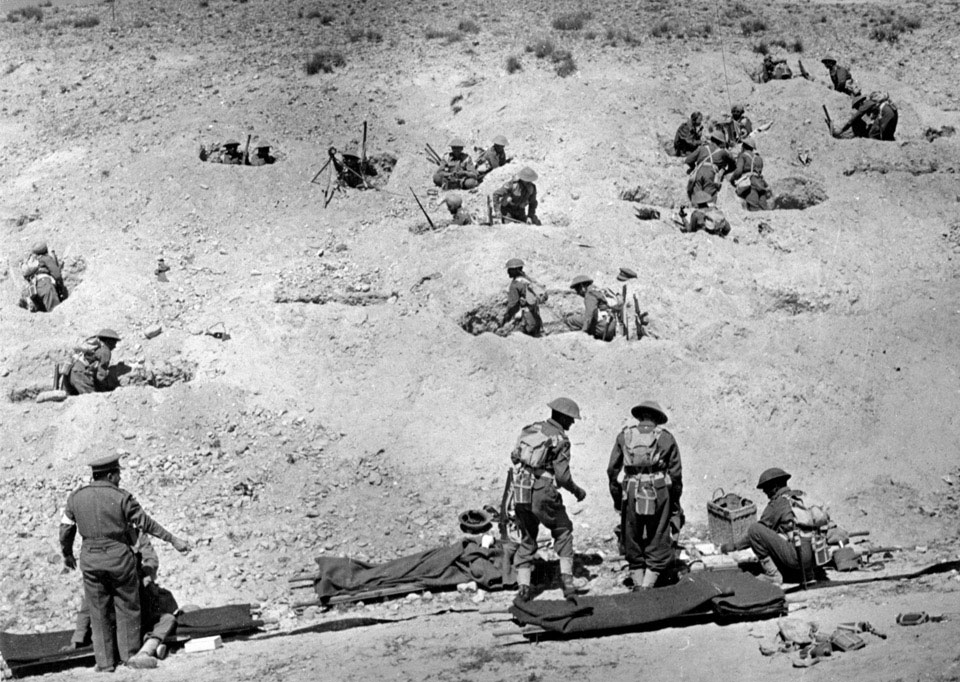
4th Division in Tunisia to which General Von Arnim surrendered

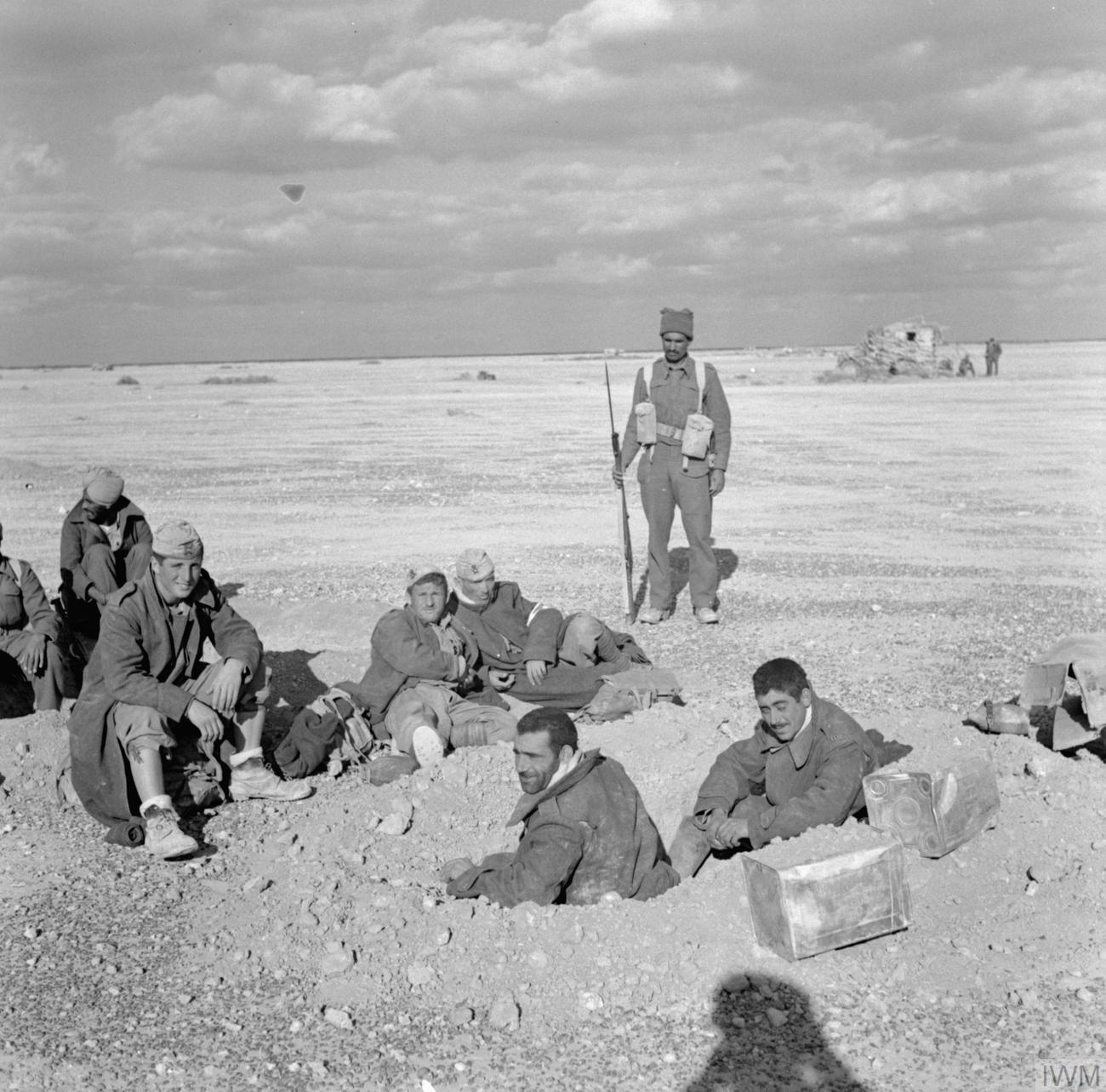
Indian soldiers guard Italian prisoners near El Adem Aerodrome

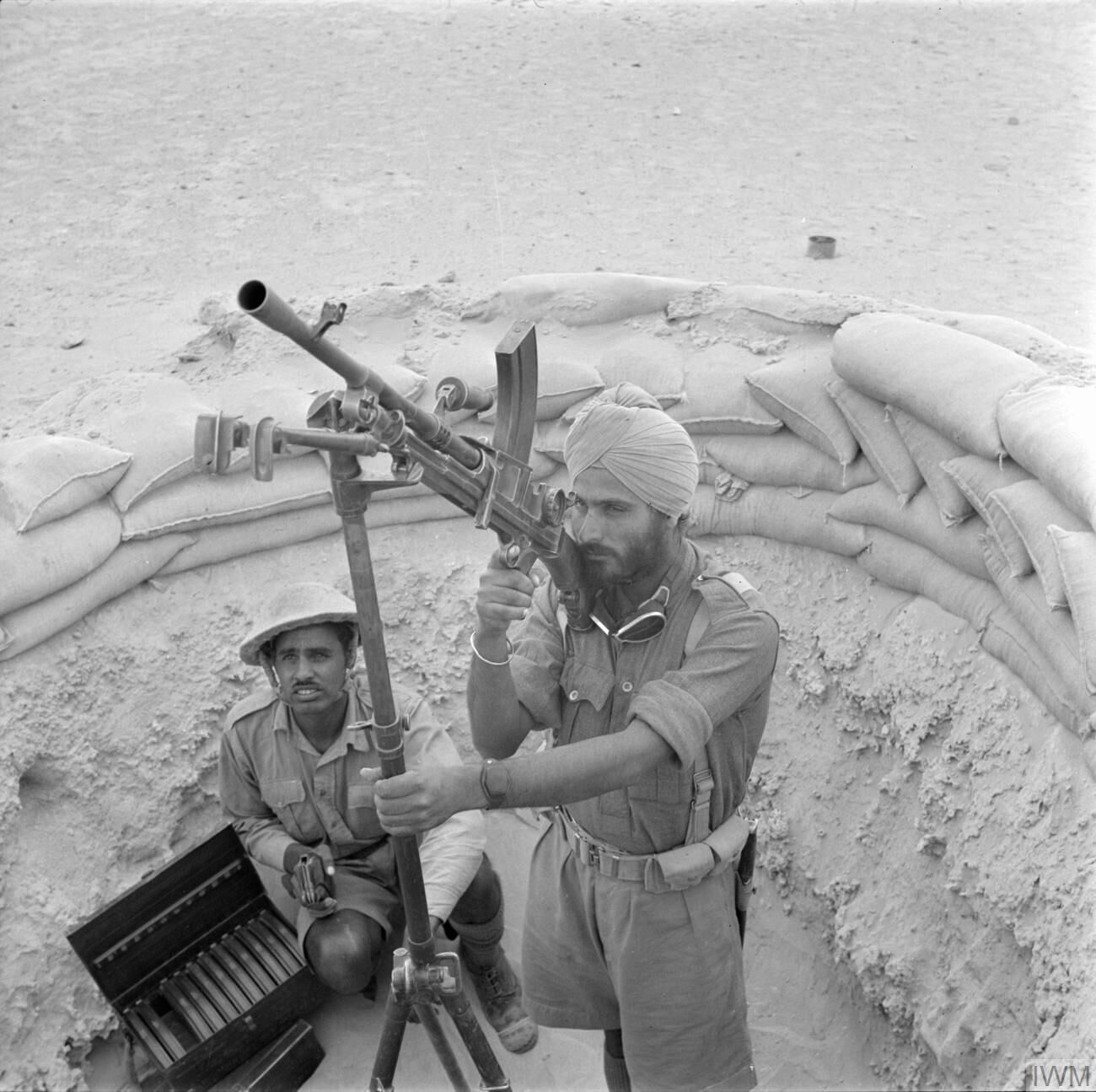
Indian troops man anti-aircraft Bren gun, Western Desert

=== East Africa ===
The Italian conquest of British Somaliland started on 3 August 1940, the 3/15th Punjab Regiment were amongst the forces on hand and they were quickly reinforced from Aden by the 1/2nd Punjab Regiment on 7 August. After the Battle of Tug Argan, the British force was forced to withdraw, the 3/15th Punjab forming part of the rearguard. By 19 August, the British and Indian battalions were evacuated to Aden. British ground losses were 38 killed, 102 wounded, and 120 missing, compared to Italian casualties of 465 killed, 1,530 wounded, and 34 missing.

In December 1940, the 4th Indian Infantry Division was rushed from Egypt to join the 5th Indian Infantry Division in the Sudan. From February to April 1941, the Indian 4th and 5th Infantry Divisions took part in the Battle of Keren, By the end of the campaign, the Italian forces had been cleared from Eritrea and Abyssinia 220,000 of them becoming prisoners of war.

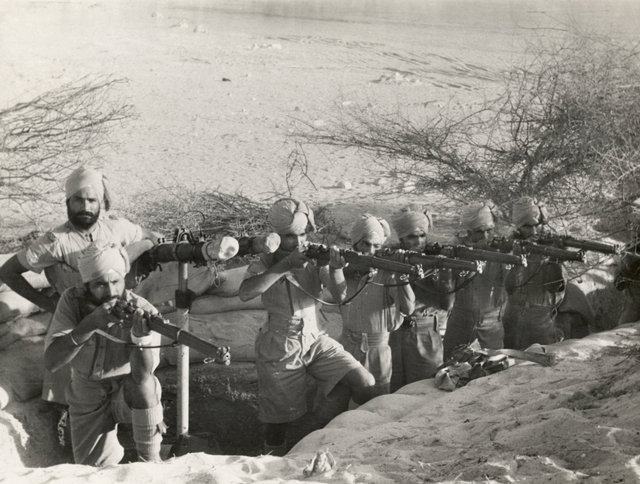
Indian soldiers at shore post in Berbera

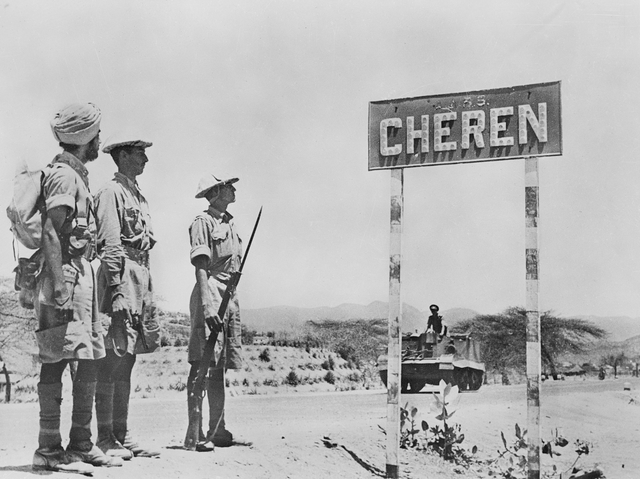
Indian Army at Keren (Cheren)

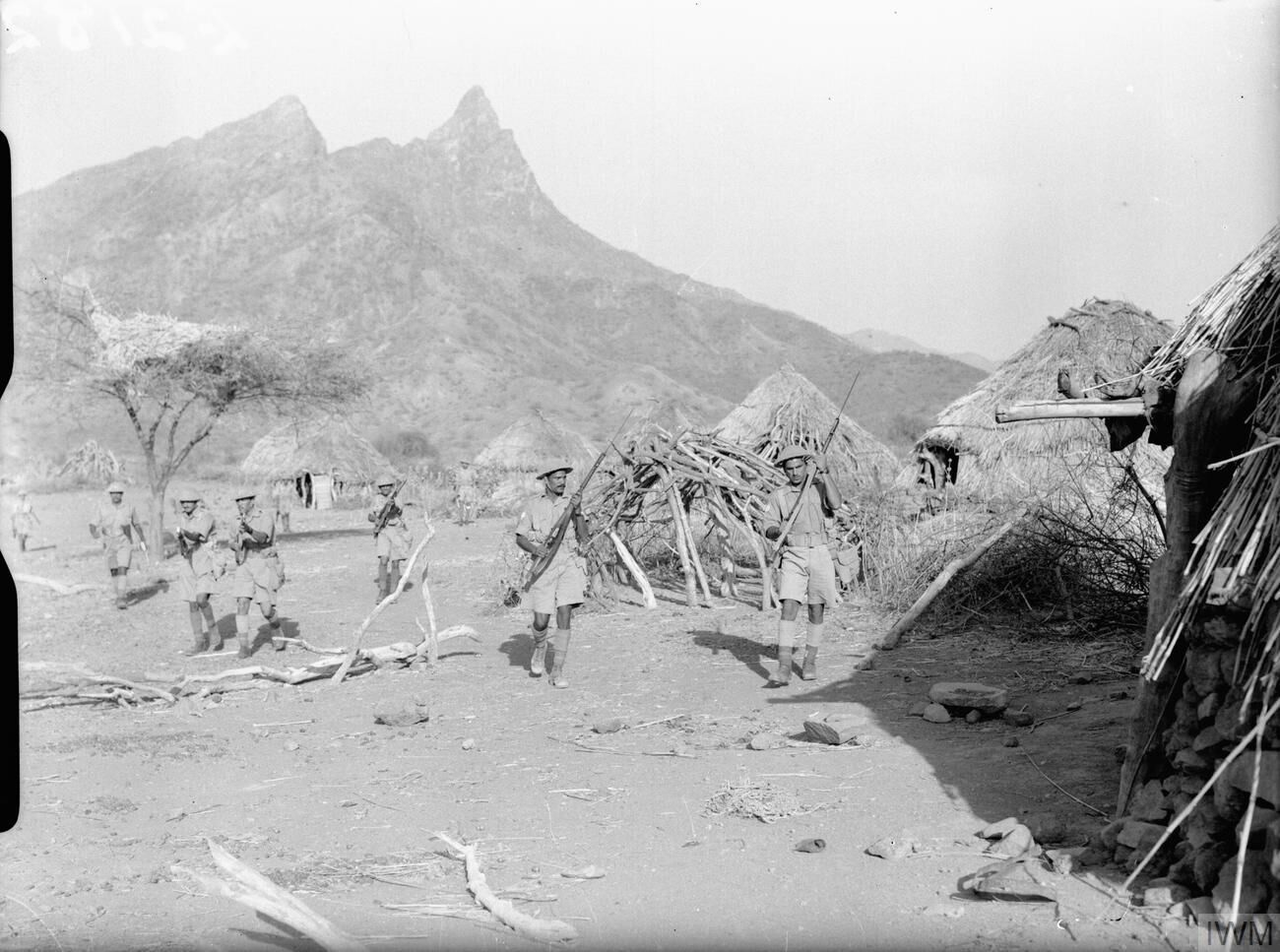
Indian soldiers clear Eritrean village

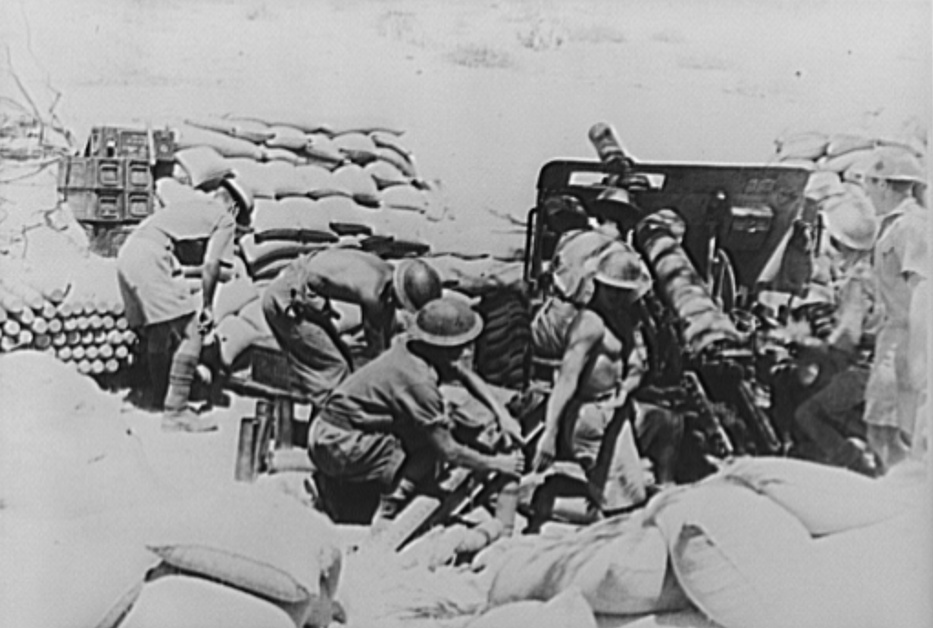
Indian Ordnance QF 18-pounder gun crew in action before capture of Keren

=== Iraq and Persia ===
In 1941, forces were required to participate in the Anglo-Iraqi War, to safeguard the overland supply route to the Soviet Union. In April, the 8th Indian Infantry Division landed at Basra and marched on Baghdad securing Iraq for the Allied cause from the pro German Rashid Ali. Operation Barbarossa the German invasion of the Soviet Union in June 1941, placed the Persian oil fields in danger from the advancing German Army. In August 1941, the Indian 8th and 10th Infantry Divisions invaded southern Persia to secure the oil installations.

The 8th and 10th Indian Infantry Divisions, 2nd Indian Armoured Brigade and the British 4th Cavalry Brigade were all involved in the Anglo-Soviet invasion of Iran (August–September 1941), which was rapid and conducted with ease. From the south, two battalions from 8th Divisions 24th Indian Brigade making an amphibious crossing of the Shatt al-Arab, captured the petroleum installations at Abadan. The 8th Division then advanced from Basra towards Qasr Shiekh and by 28 August had reached Ahvaz when the Shah ordered hostilities to cease. Further north, eight battalions of British and Indian troops under Major-General William Slim advanced from Khanaqin into the Naft-i-Shah oilfield and on towards the Pai Tak Pass, leading towards Kermanshah and Hamadan. The Pai Tak position was taken on 27 August after the defenders had withdrawn in the night; the planned assault on Kermanshah on 29 August was aborted when the defenders called a truce to negotiate surrender terms.

After hostilities had ended, the 2nd Indian Infantry Division, 6th Indian Infantry Division and 12th Indian Infantry Division all remained in the region on internal security duties.

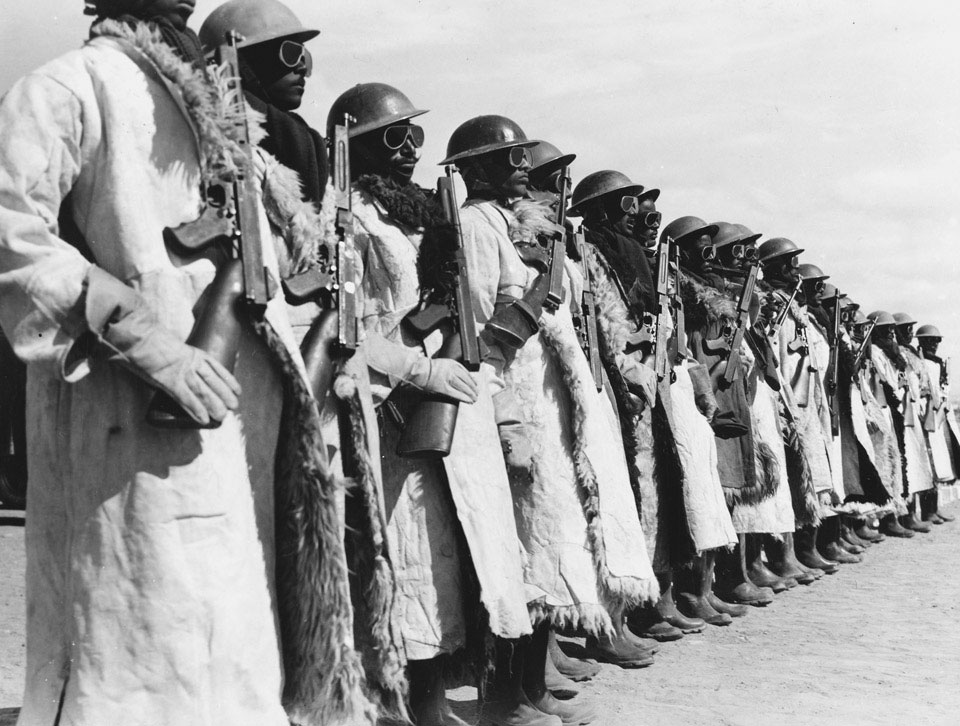
Indian troops in winter clothing in Persia

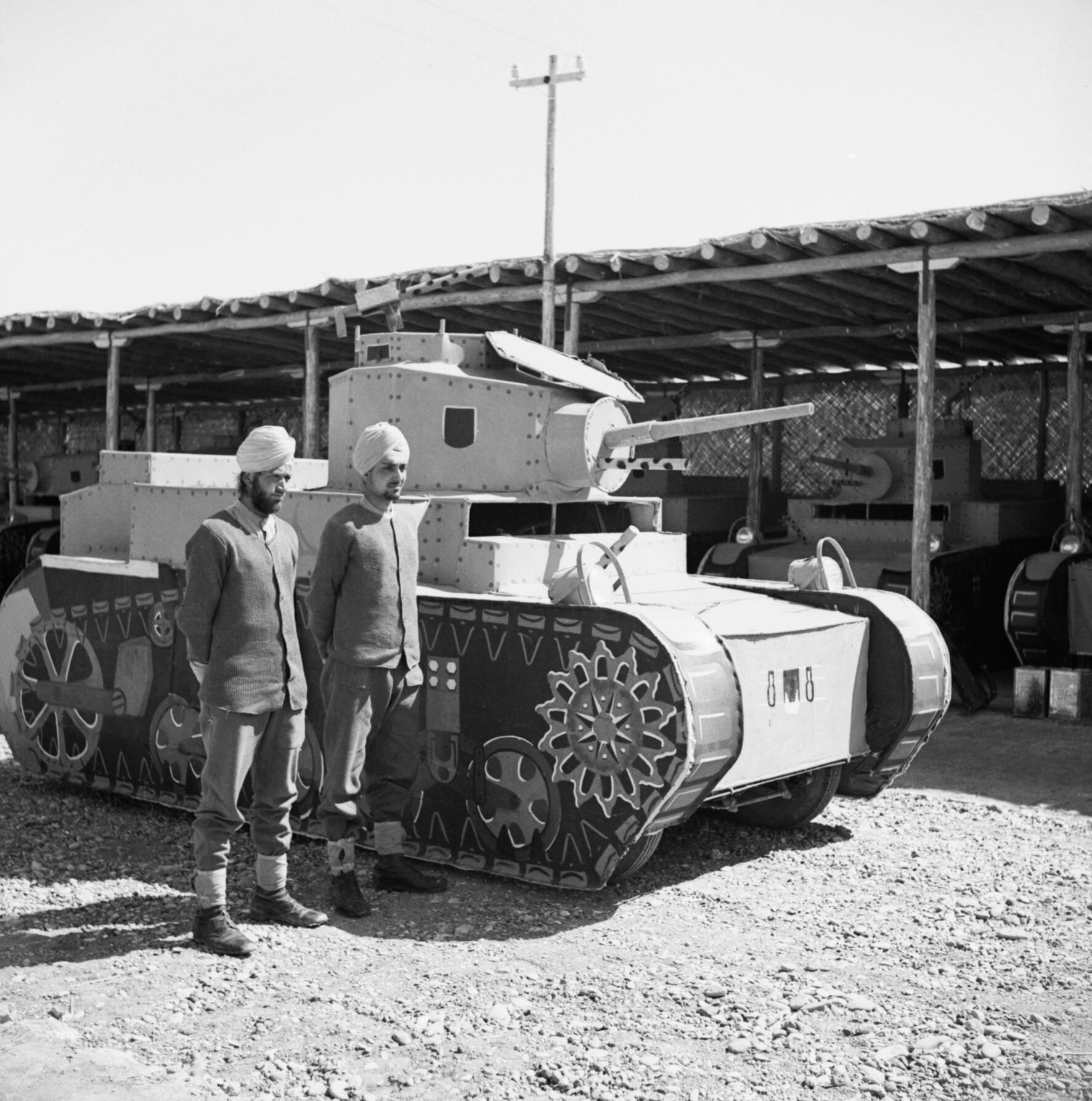
Indian camouflage unit with dummy Stuart tank in Baghdad

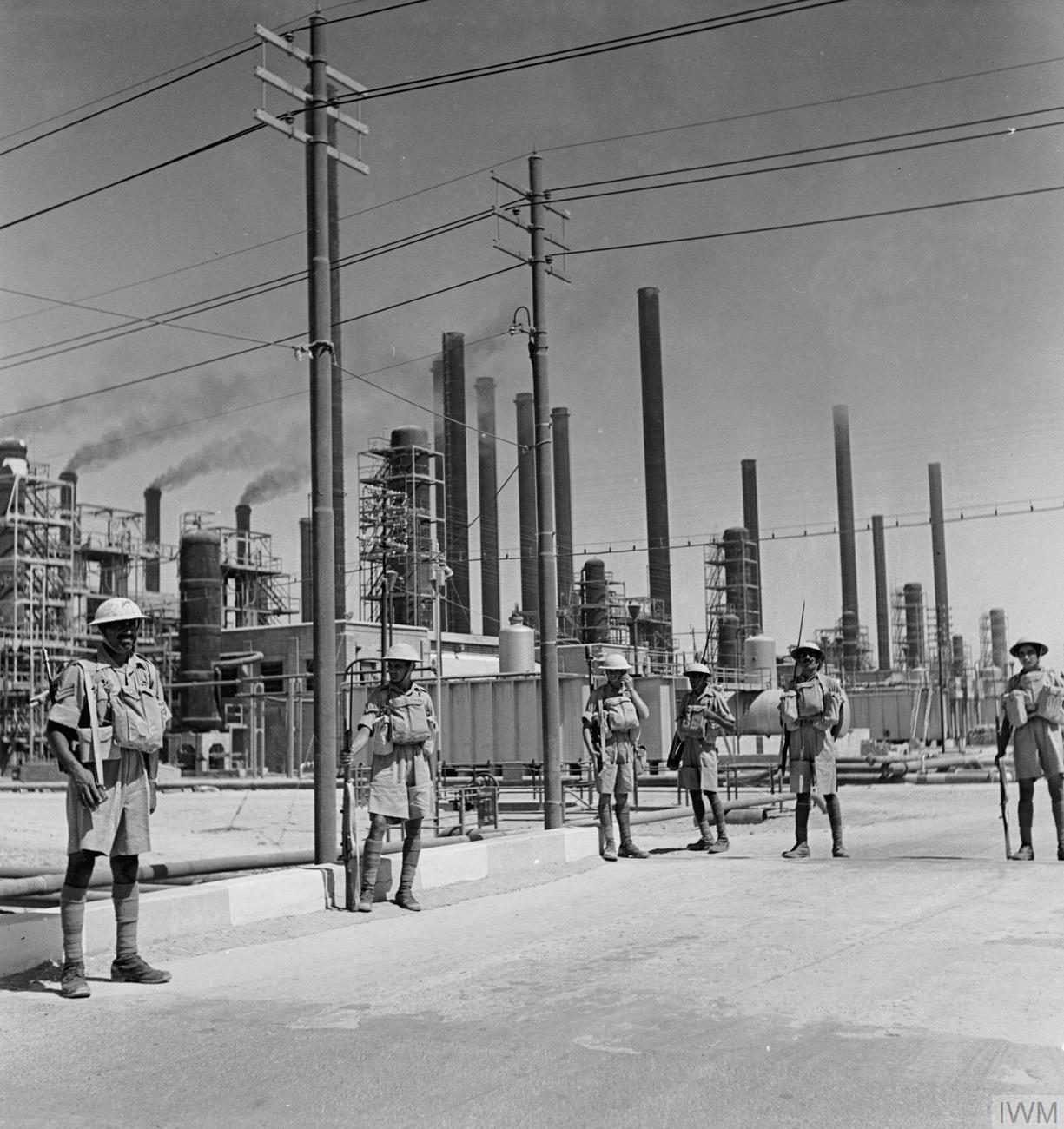
Indian soldiers guard Anglo-Iranian Oil Company refinery at Abadan

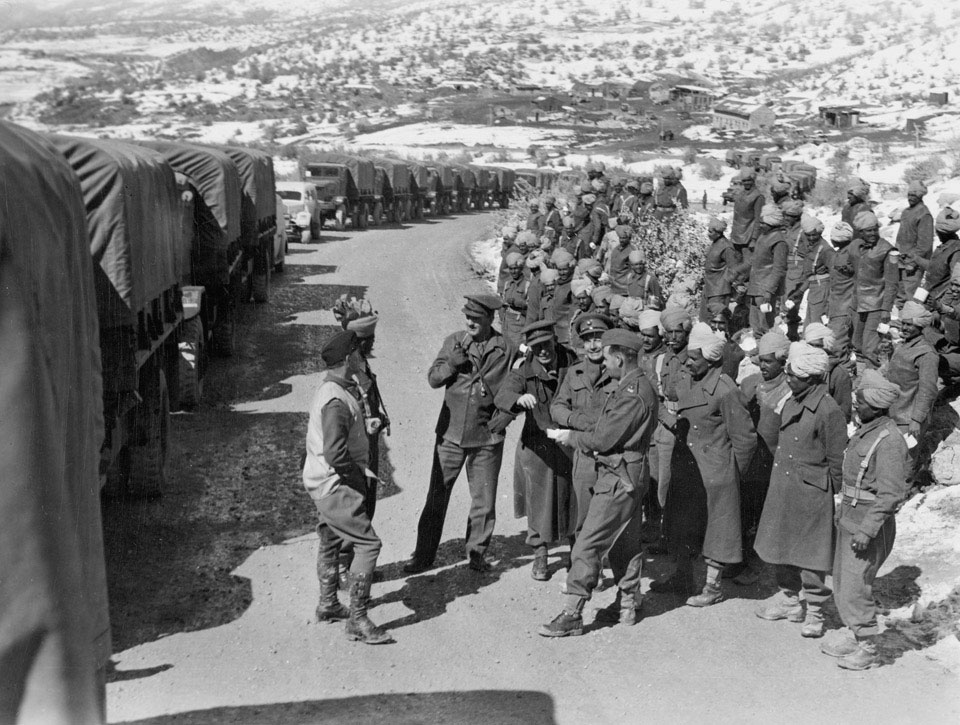
Indian soldiers stand next to supply convoy en route to Soviet Union

=== Syria and Lebanon ===
The Indian Army supplied the 5th Brigade, 4th Indian Infantry Division which attacked from the south with the Australian I Corps and the 10th Indian Infantry Division which also had the 17th Indian Infantry Brigade, 8th Indian Infantry Division under command was part of Iraqforce attack northern and central Syria from the east. 5th Brigade took part in the Battle of Kissoué and the Battle of Damascus, June 1941, and 10th Division the Battle of Deir ez-Zor in July.

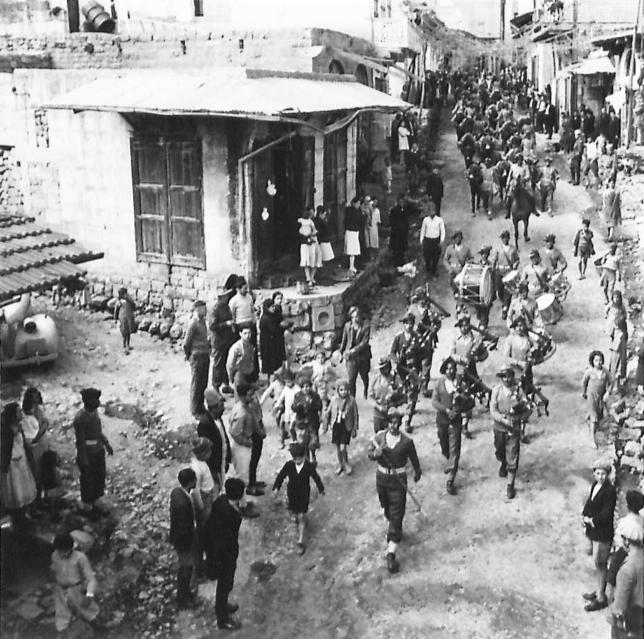
Indian troops march through Zgharta

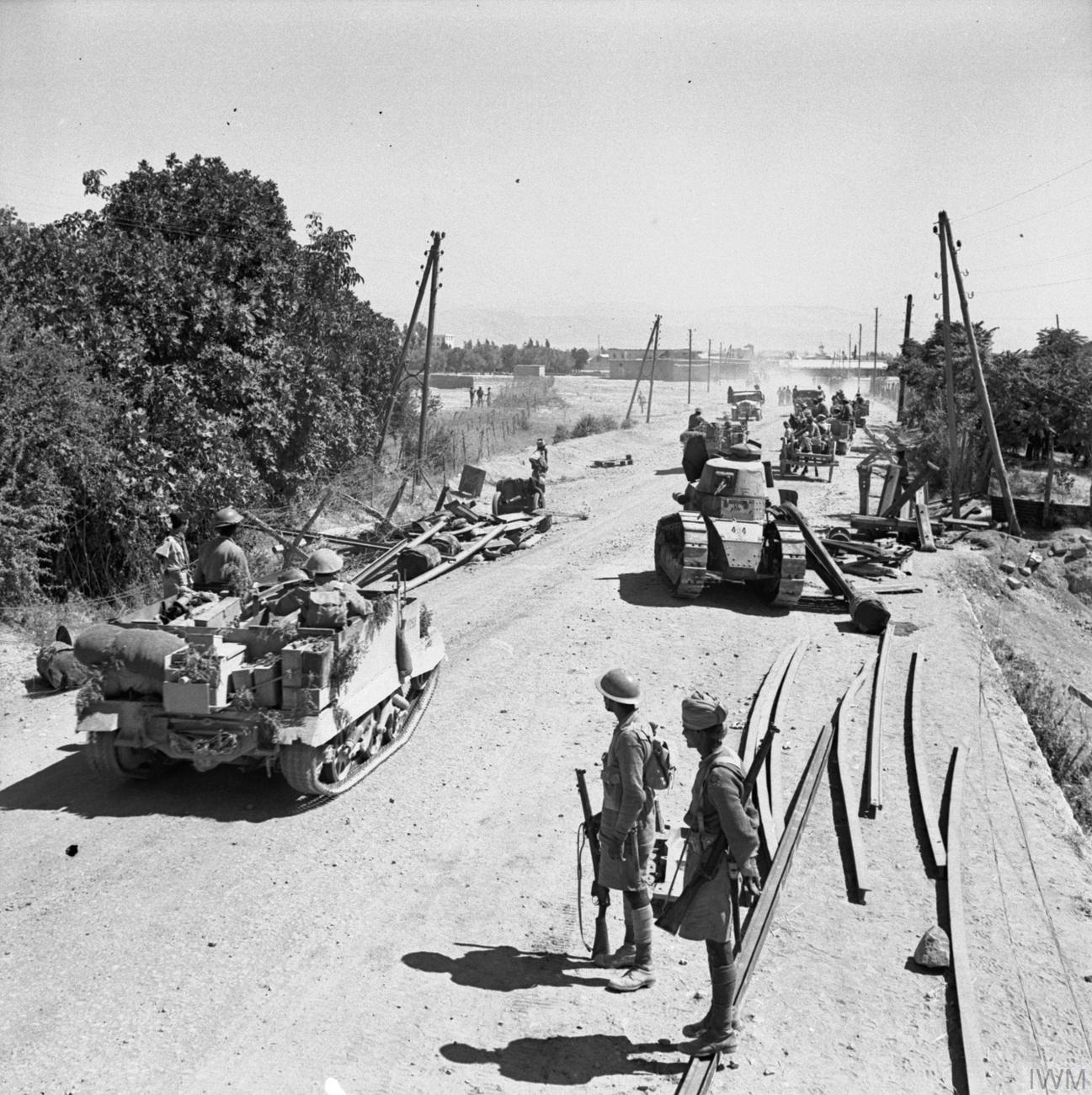
Indian tank passes wrecked Vichy French tank on road to Damascus

== South-East Asia ==
=== Hong Kong ===
The Japanese Army attacked Hong Kong on 8 December 1941, less than eight hours after their attack on Pearl Harbor. The garrison comprised British, Indian and Canadian battalions plus local Hong Kong Chinese reservists. The Indian Army troops were the 5/7th Rajput Regiment and the 2/14th Punjab Regiment. The garrison held out for 18 days before being forced to surrender.

=== Malaya ===
As in Egypt, the Indian Army dispatched one infantry brigade to Malaya just before the start of the war. By 1941, all training and equipment was geared to fight in North Africa and the Middle East and the forces in Burma and Malaya had been depleted to supply reinforcements to the forces in the west. As a result, in the spring of 1941, the 9th Indian Infantry Division was sent to Malaya.

On 8 December, the Japanese Army attacked the Malayan peninsula, the defenders now included the Indian 9th and the 11th Indian Infantry Divisions, the 12th Indian Infantry Brigade and a number of independent battalions and units of Imperial Service Troops, in the III Indian Corps. The 11th Indian division fought the Battle of Jitra 11–13 December, the Battle of Kampar 30 December – 2 January, the Battle of Slim River 6–8 January 1942. The 44th Indian Infantry Brigade and the 45th Indian Infantry Brigade had arrived as reinforcement in January 1942. The 45th Brigade fought the Battle of Muar 14–22 January, of the 4,000 men in the brigade only 800 survived the battle.

=== Singapore ===
The Battle of Singapore 31 January – 15 February ended with the capture of 9th and 11th Indian Divisions and the 12th, 44th and 45th brigades and 55,000 Indian servicemen were made prisoners of war. Regrettably on 26 January 1943, 269 of those prisoners of war (POWs) from the 16th Punjab Regiment were among those aboard the Japanese transport ship Buyo Maru. During the incident, some 195 of them lost their lives.

During the battle for Singapore, Indian units fought in the Battle of Bukit Timah and the Battle of Pasir Panjang.

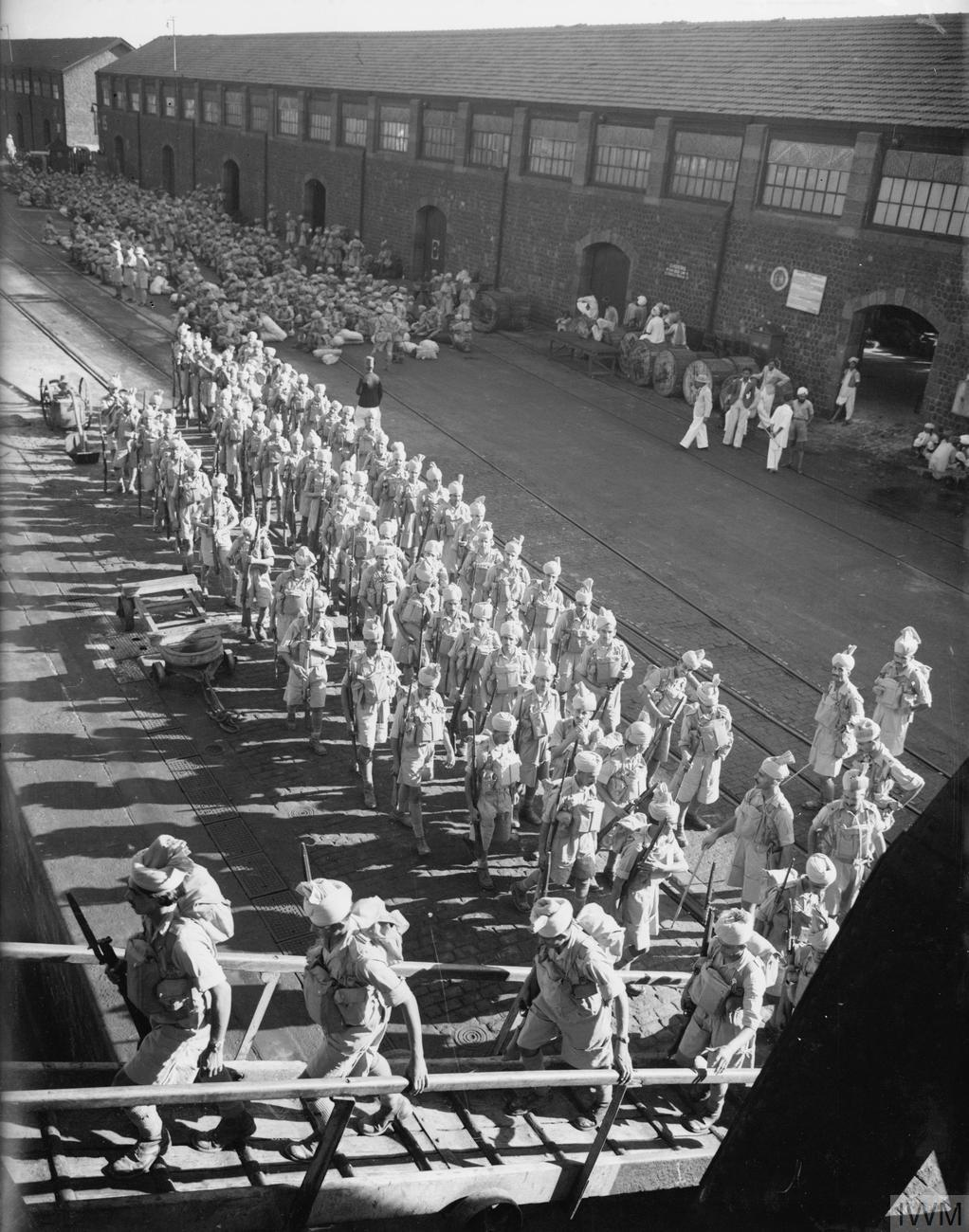
Boarding in Bombay bound for Singapore and Batavia

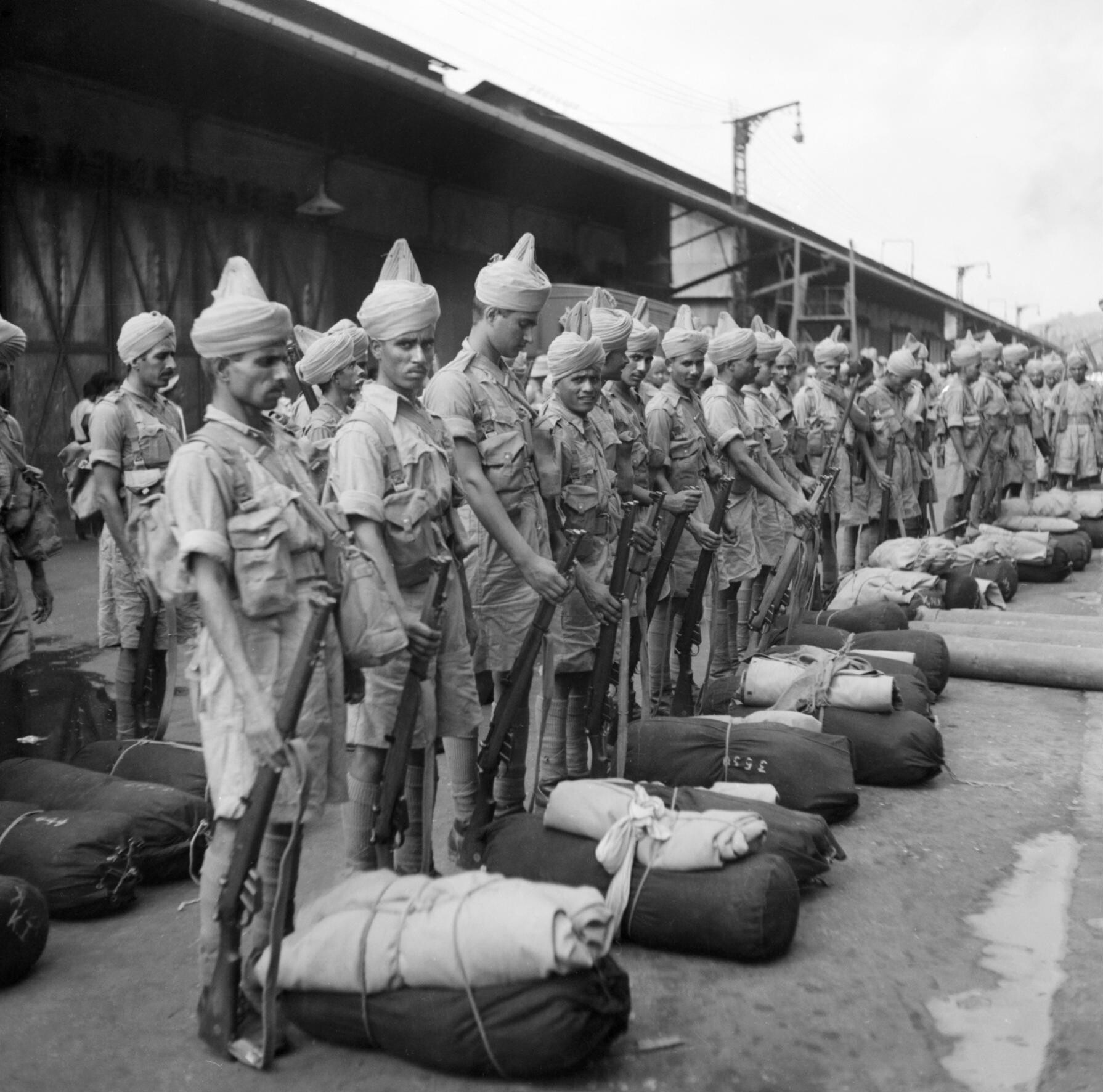
Newly-arrived troops line up in Singapore

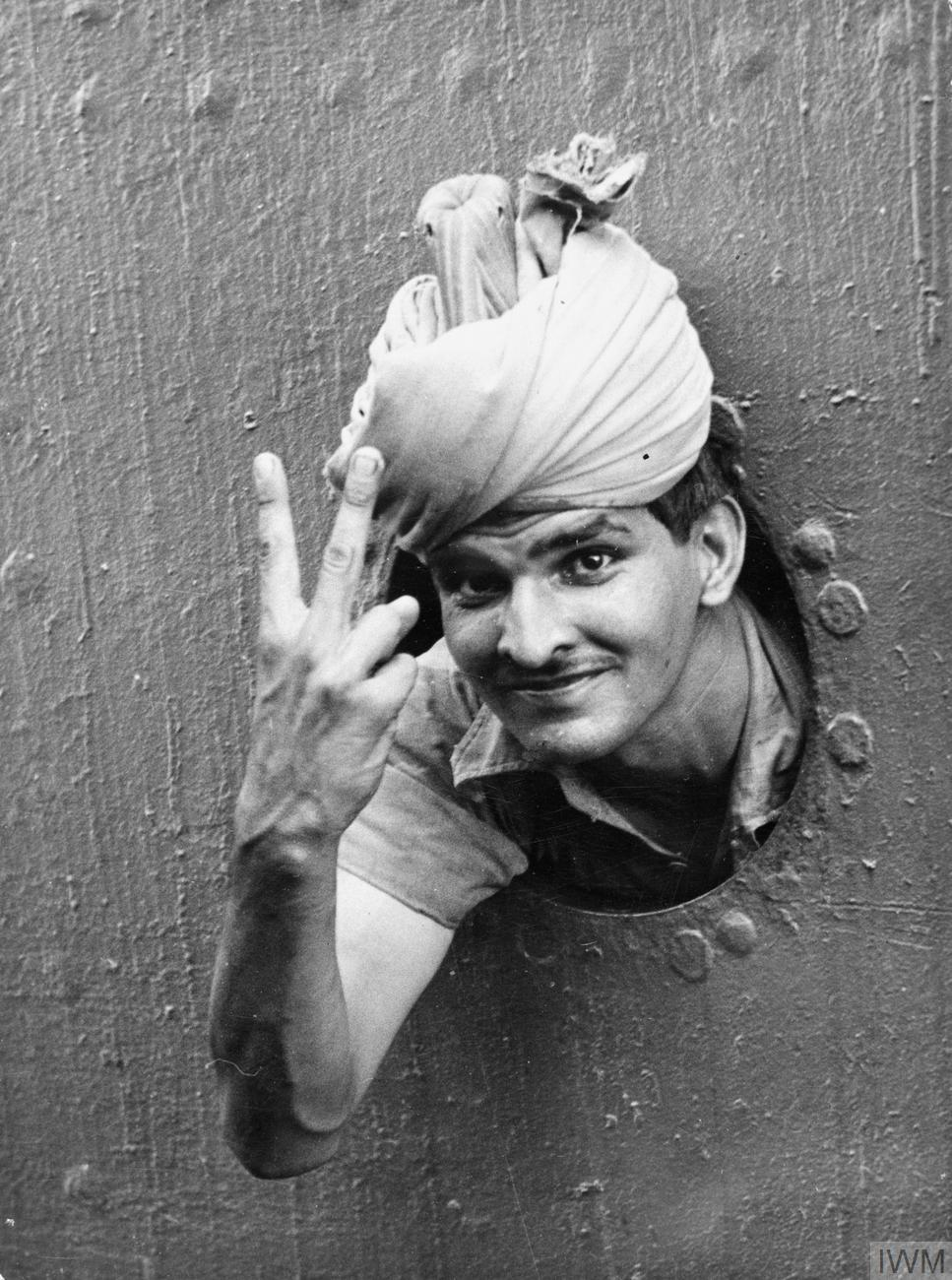
Soldier flashes Churchill Victory Sign

=== Borneo ===
In late 1940, Air Chief Marshal Sir Robert Brooke-Popham ordered the 2nd Battalion, 15th Punjab Regiment and a heavy 6 in (150 mm) gun battery from the Hong Kong-Singapore Royal Artillery, to be positioned at Kuching, the capital of Sarawak. The battalion, which numbered about 1,050 men, was commanded by British Lieutenant Colonel C.M. Lane and was a part of "SARFOR" (Sarawak Force). Some 230 men of the battalion were killed or captured in the defence of the airfield before the fall of the city to the Japanese on 24 December 1941. Two days later, SARFOR was disbanded; on the 27th, the remainder of the Punjabi force crossed into Dutch Borneo, where Lane placed them under Dutch command. The men continued to resist the Japanese in the dense jungle of southern Borneo until 1 April, when they finally surrendered. Arthur Percival, GOC Malaya, later called their resistance "a feat of endurance which assuredly will rank high in the annals of warfare. It says much for the morale of this fine battalion that it remained a formed and disciplined body to the end."

=== Return to Malaya and Singapore ===
25th Indian Infantry Division with 3 Commando Brigade, in January 1945 the Division took part in the first large scale Amphibious Operations in South East Asia, They were ferried across the Four Mile wide Mayu Estuary to land on the Northern beaches of Akyab Island, in the course of the following weeks they occupied Myrbaw and Ruywa. In April 1945. the division was withdrawn to South India to prepare for Operation Zipper the invasion of Malaya, having been chosen for the assault landing role. Although hostilities then ceased, the operation proceeded as planned, 23rd and 25th Divisions was the first formations to land in Malaya 9 September, and then accepting the surrender of the Japanese Army.

Operation Tiderace (5th Indian Infantry Division) commenced when troops set sail from Trincomalee and Rangoon on 21 August for Singapore. The fleet arrived in Singapore on 4 September 1945, and Japanese forces in Singapore officially surrendered to Admiral Lord Louis Mountbatten, Supreme Allied Commander South East Asia Command on 12 September 1945.

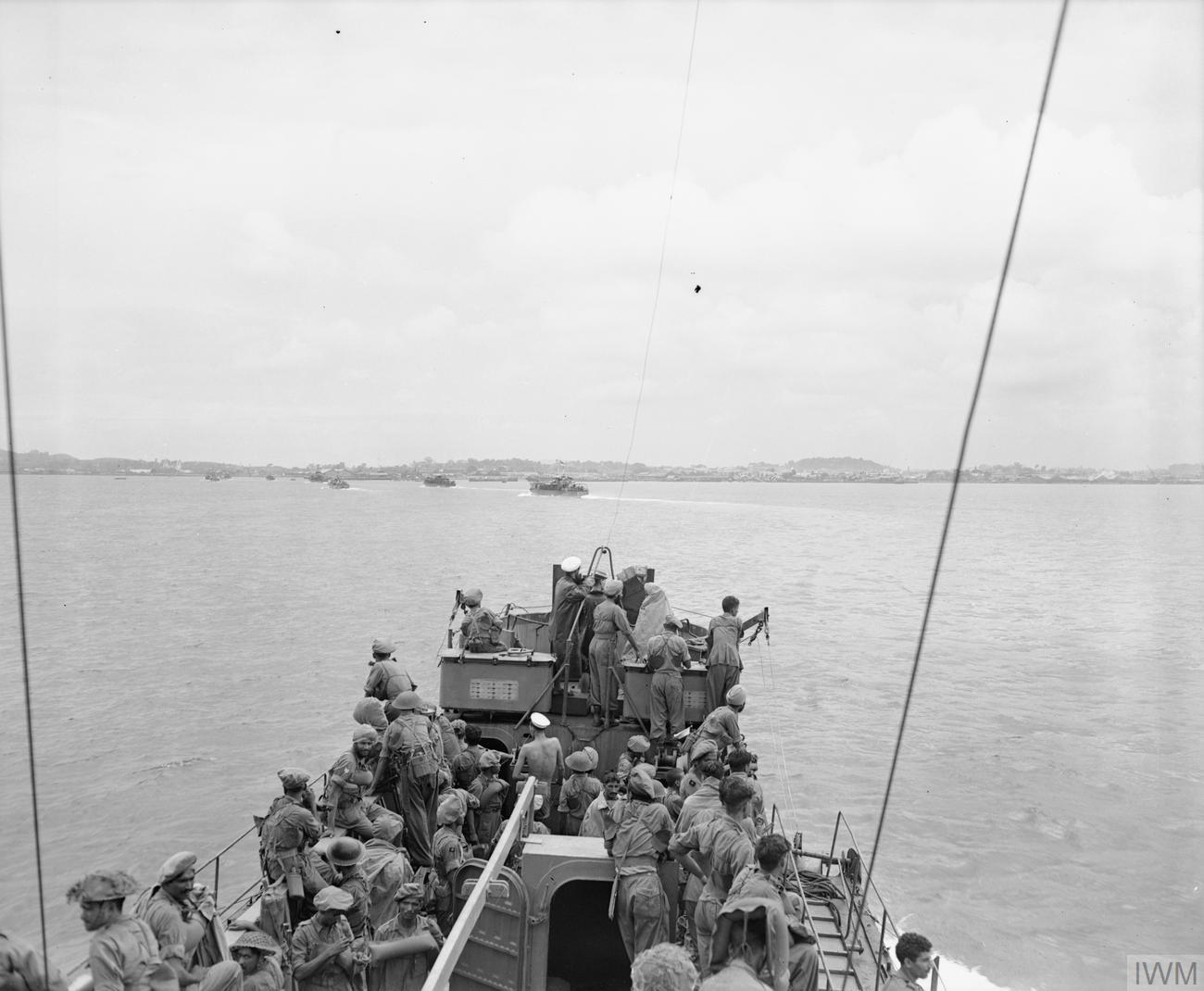
Indian landing craft enter bay at Singapore

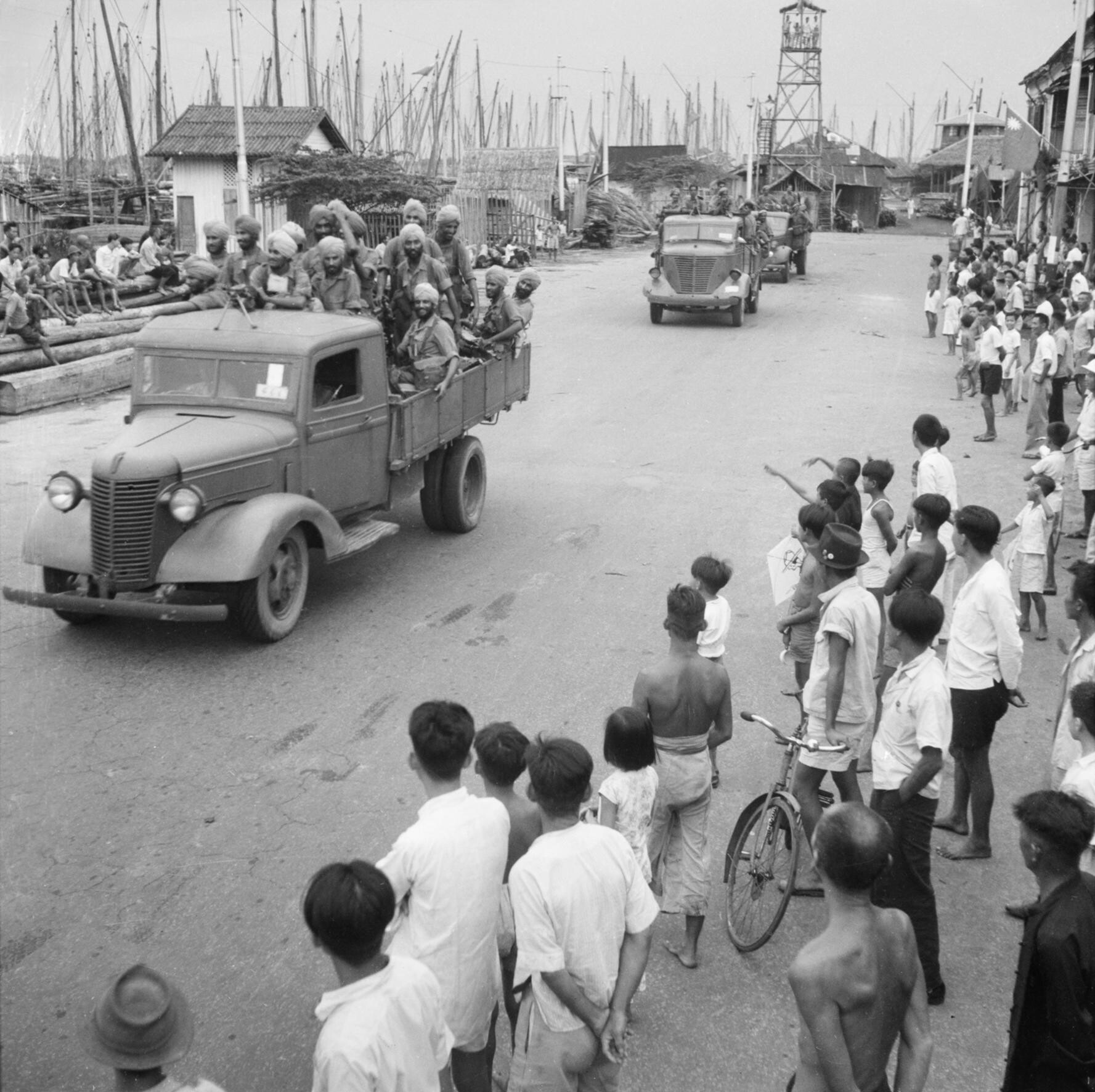
5th Division pass through streets of Singapore

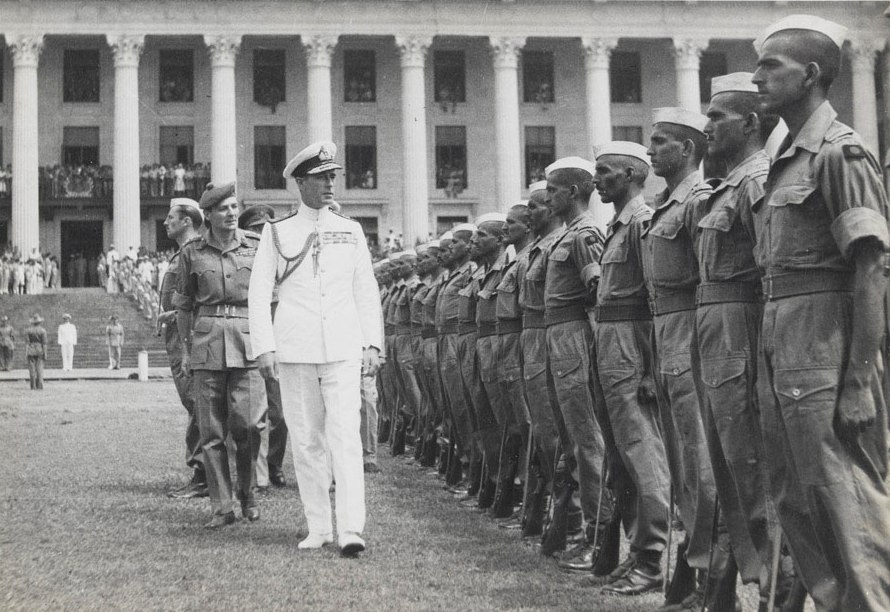
Lord Mountbatten inspects 17th Dogras after Japanese surrender in Singapore

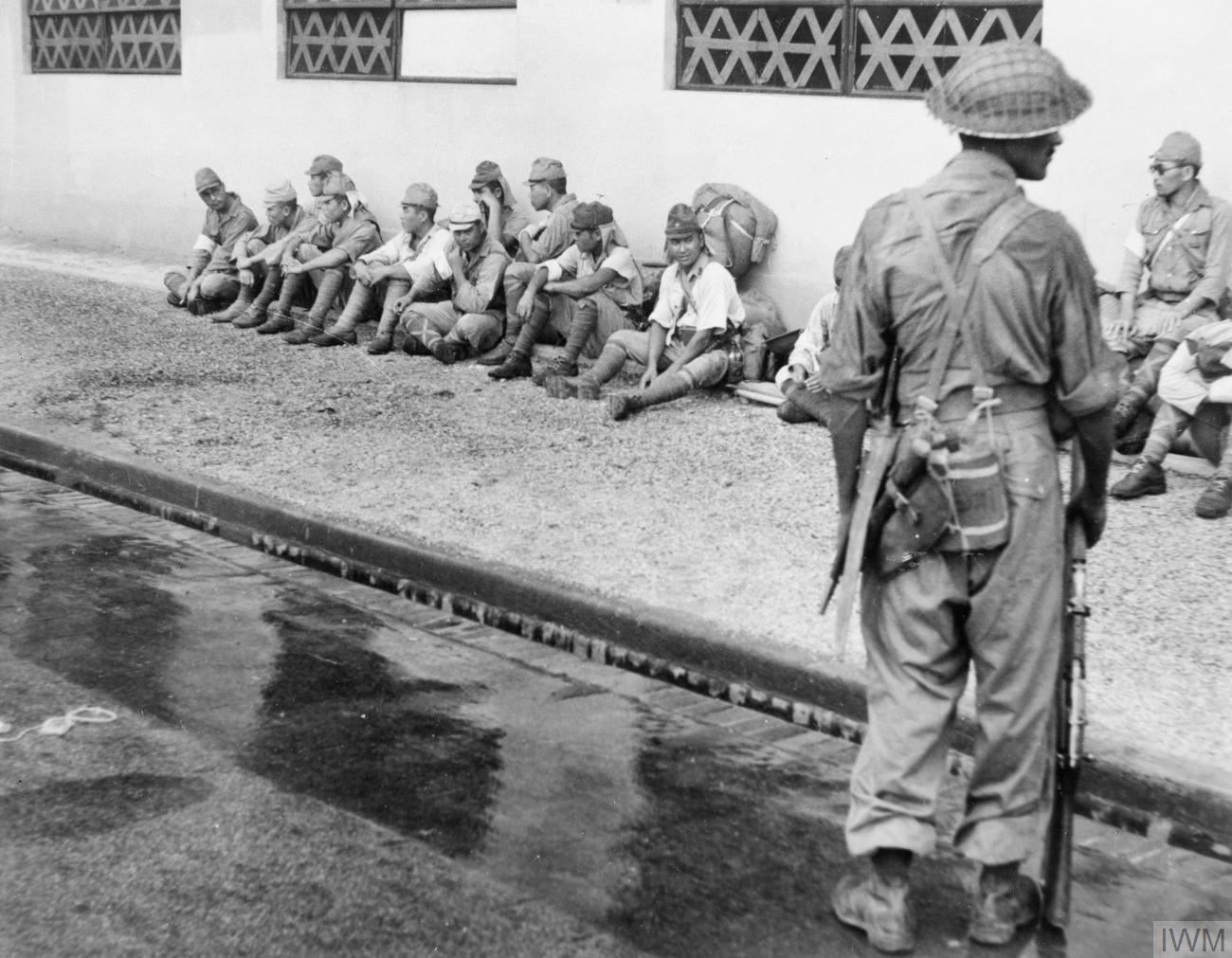
Indian soldier guards Japanese prisoners in Singapore

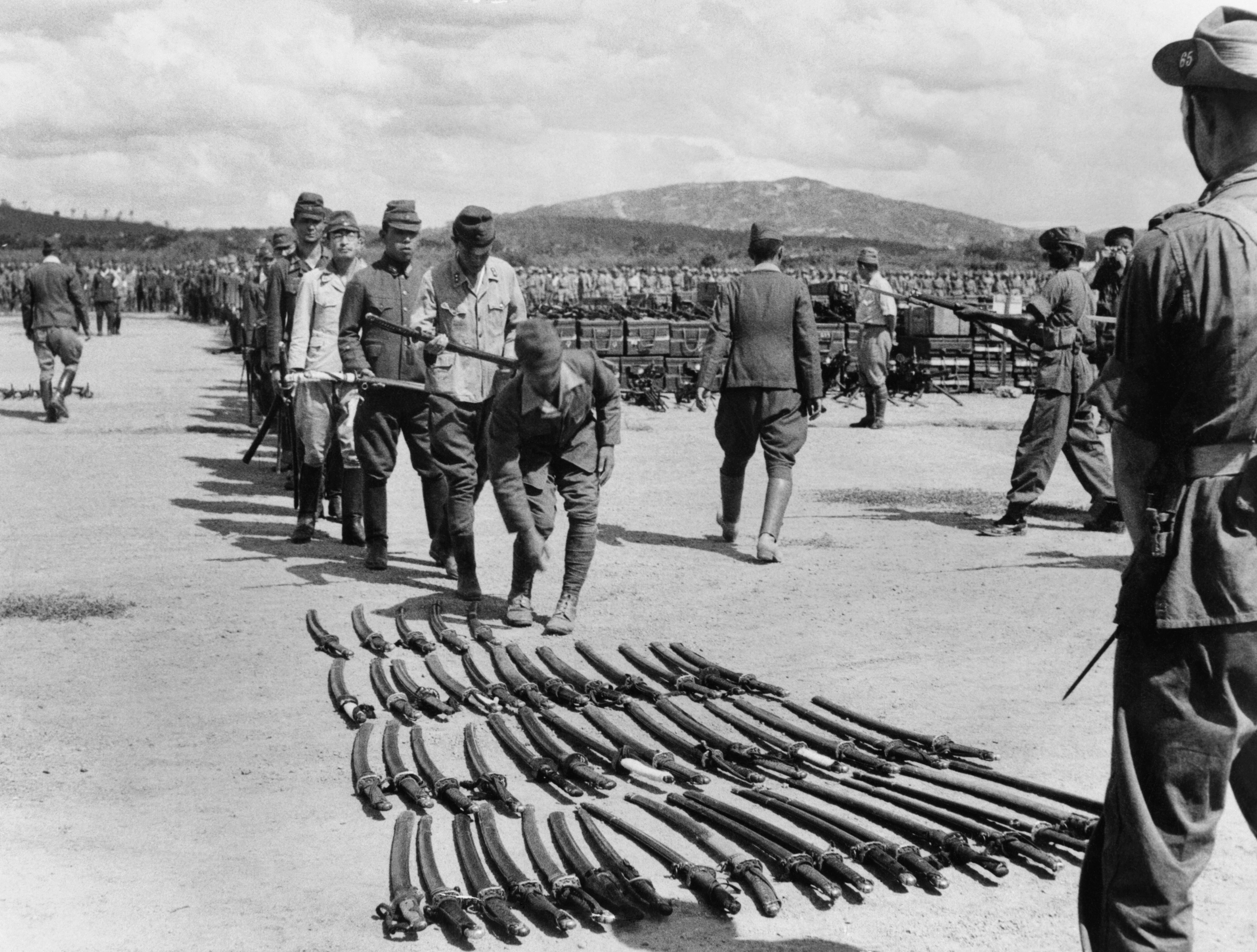
Japanese officers surrender swords to 25th Division in Kuala Lumpur

=== Post-Japanese surrender ===
After the Japanese surrender, some divisions were sent to disarm the Japanese and assist the local governments. The 7th Division moved to Thailand, where it disarmed the Japanese occupying army, and liberated and repatriated Allied prisoners of war. The 20th Division was sent to French Indochina, occupying the southern part of the colony. There were several battles with the Viet Minh, who were intent on achieving independence. The 23rd Division was sent to Java, where the end of the war had brought widespread disorder and conflict between the Dutch colonial regime and pro-independence movements.

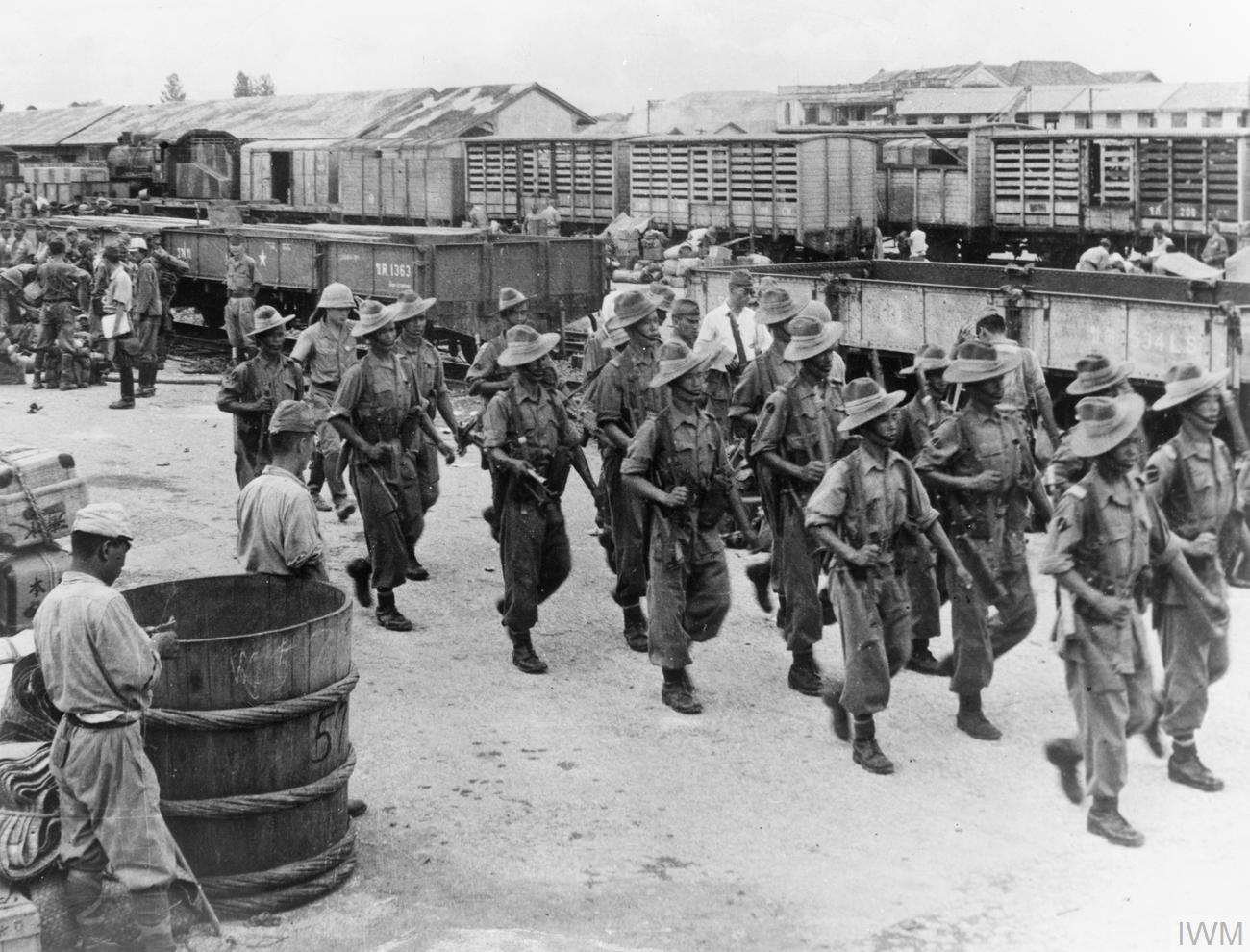
7th Division supervise disarmament of Japanese prisoners in Bangkok

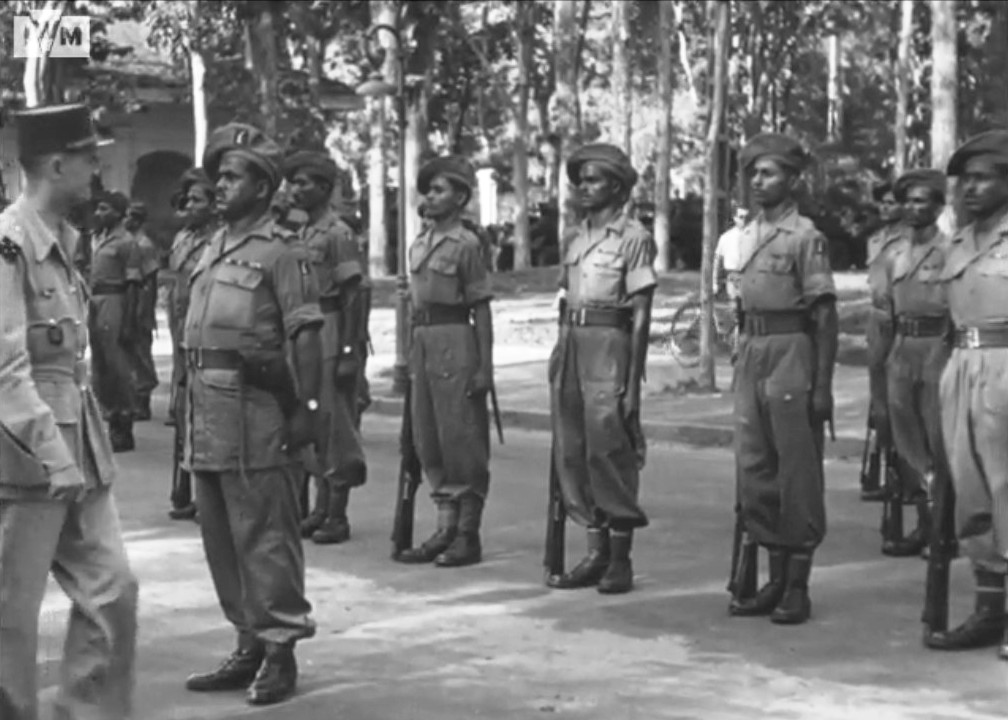
General Leclerc reviews troops of 20th Division in Saigon

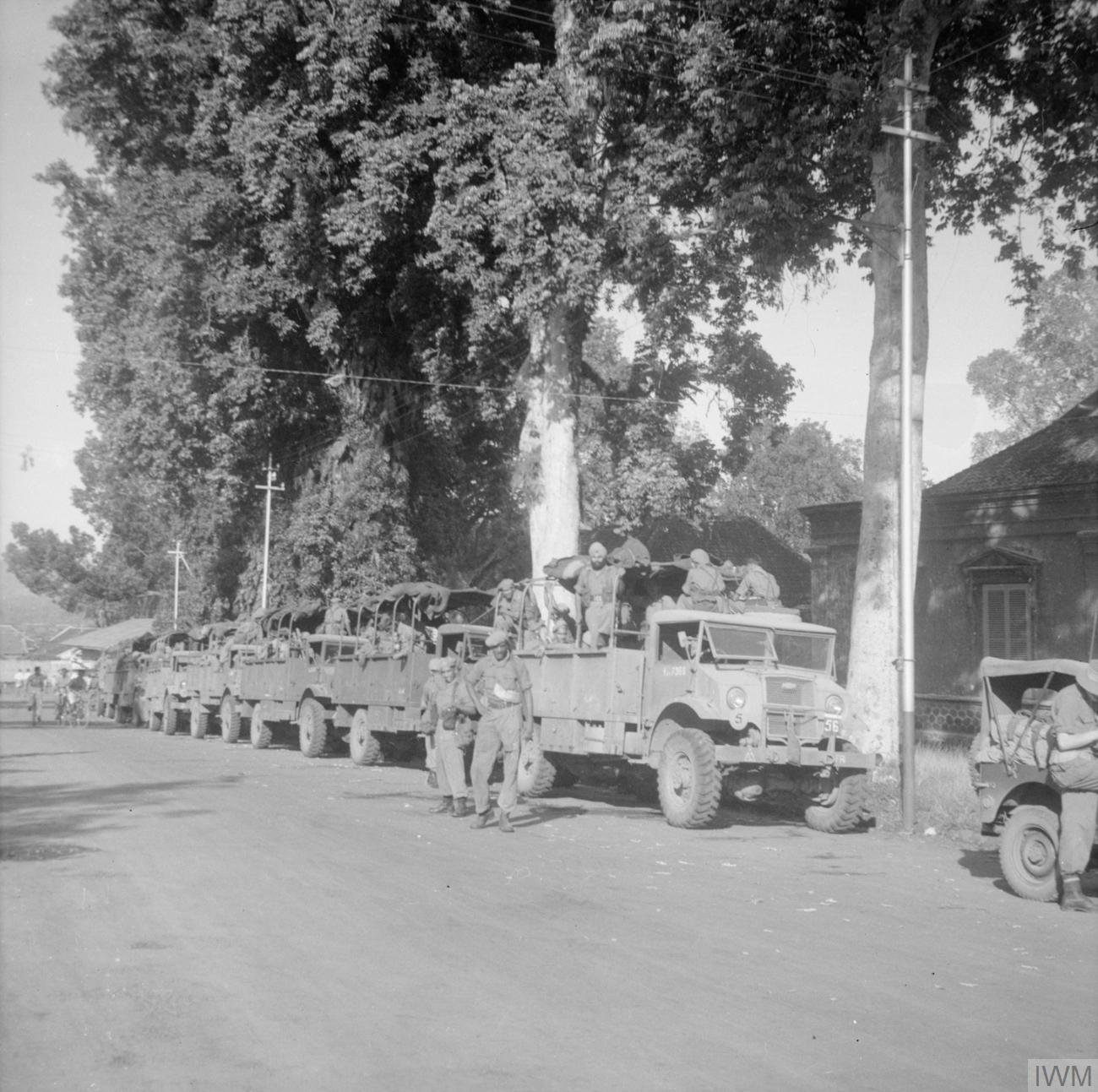
36th Brigade clear Batavia-Bandoeng road of snipers and ambush squads

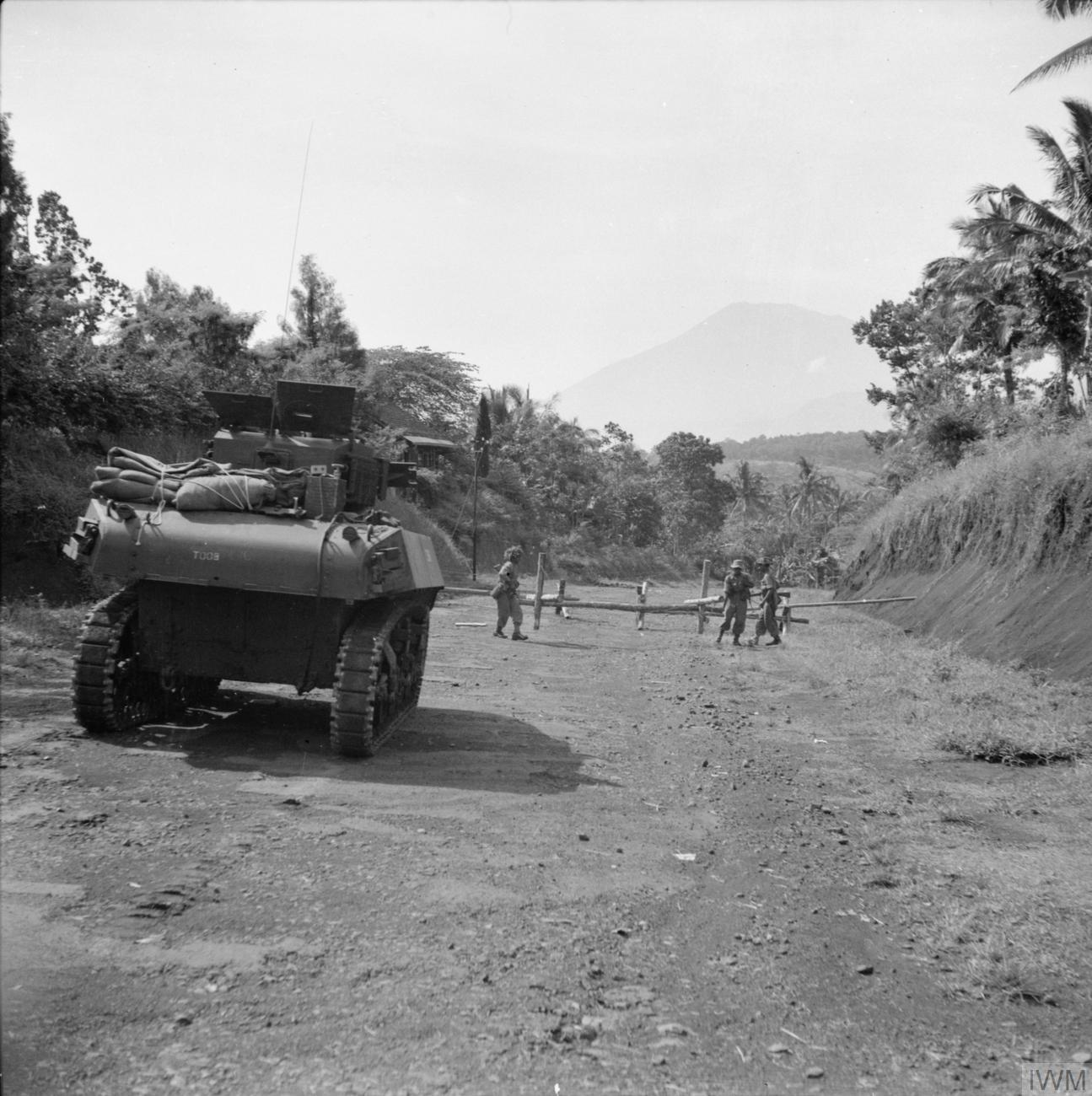
Indian troops on road to Bangjoebiroe Camp to free Dutch civilians held by Indonesian Nationalists

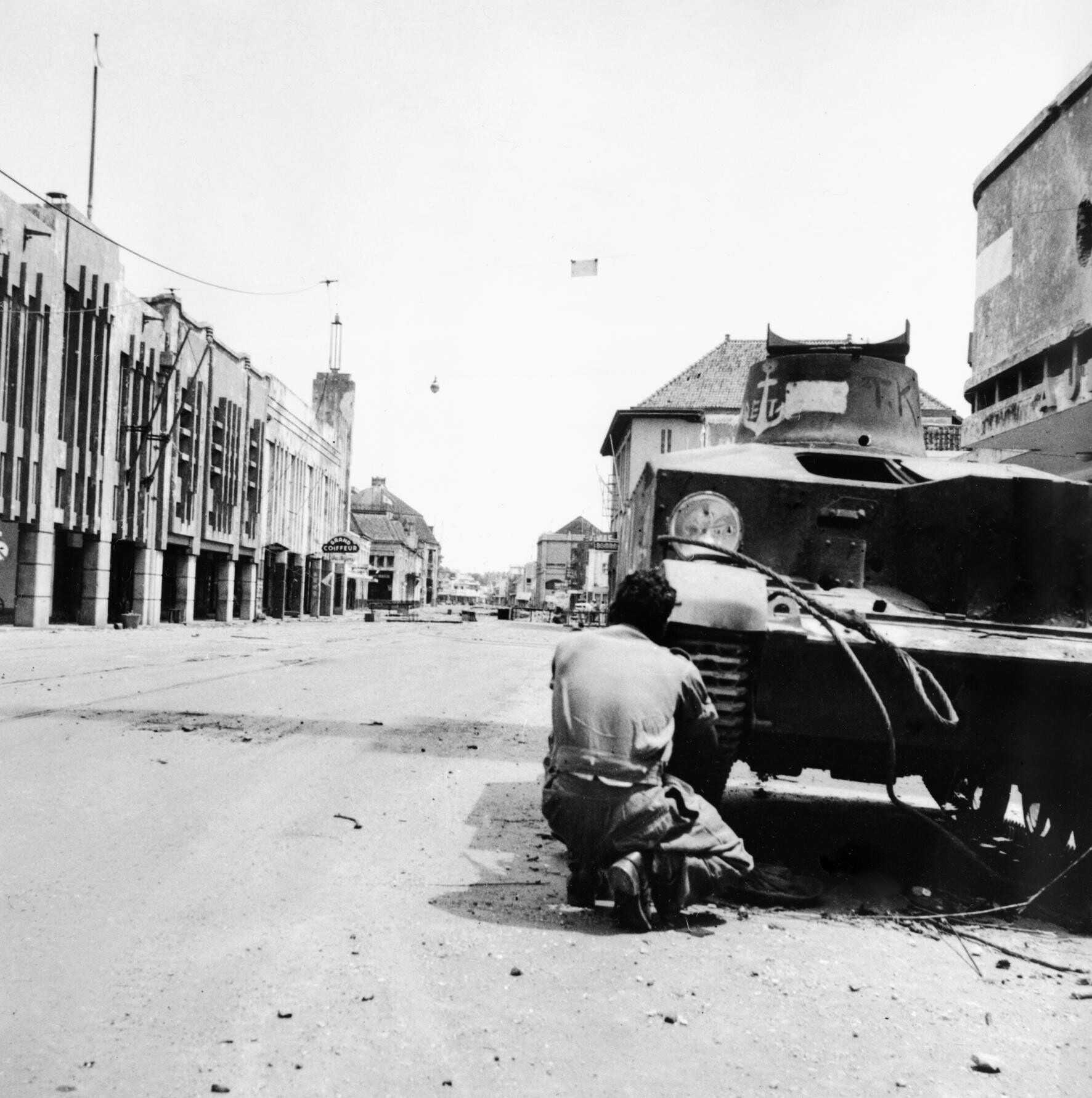
Indian soldier takes cover, Battle of Surabaya

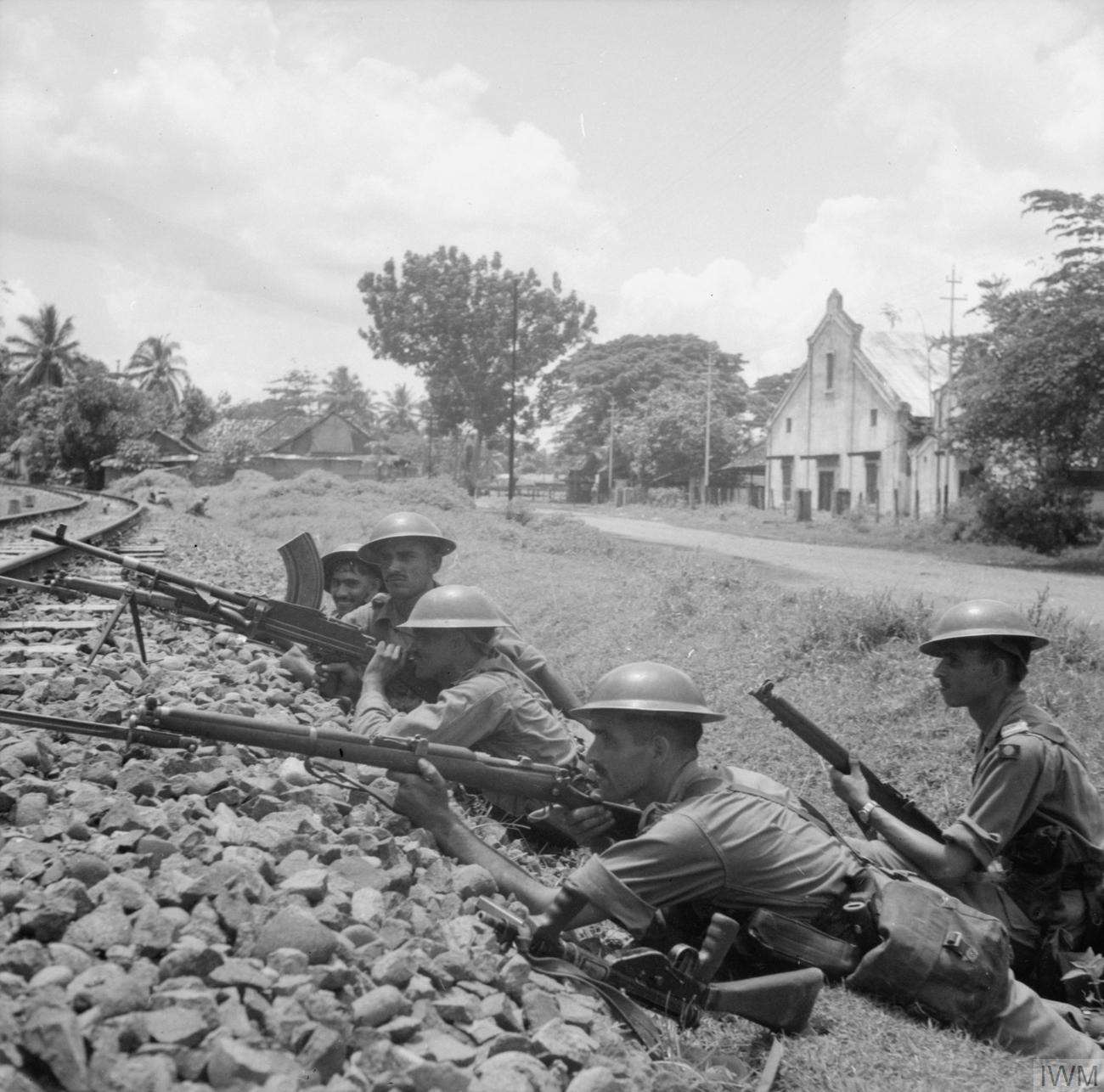
4/7th Rajputs in position along railway line at Bekasi, Java

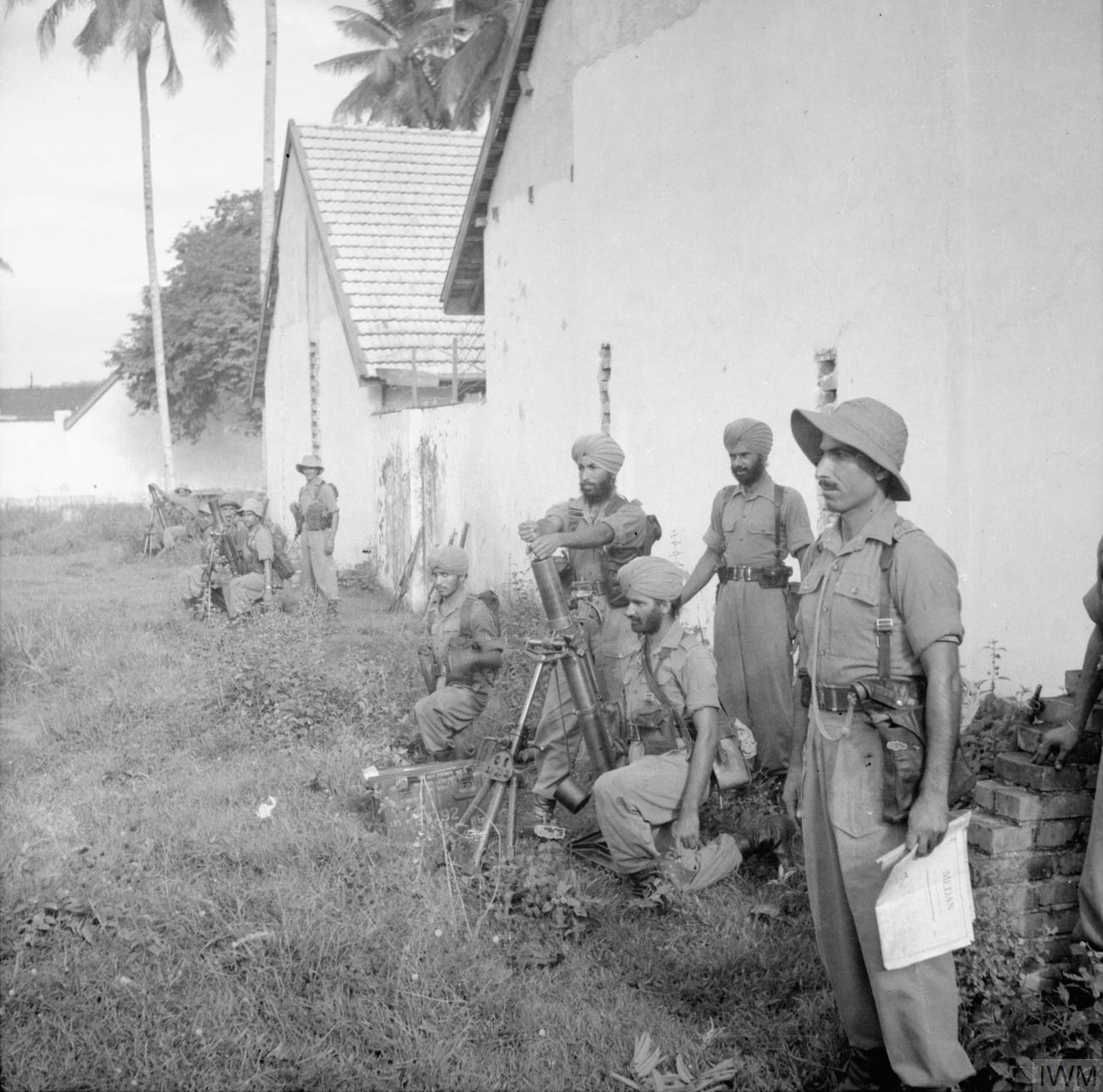
26th Division mortar positions outside Medan, Sumatra

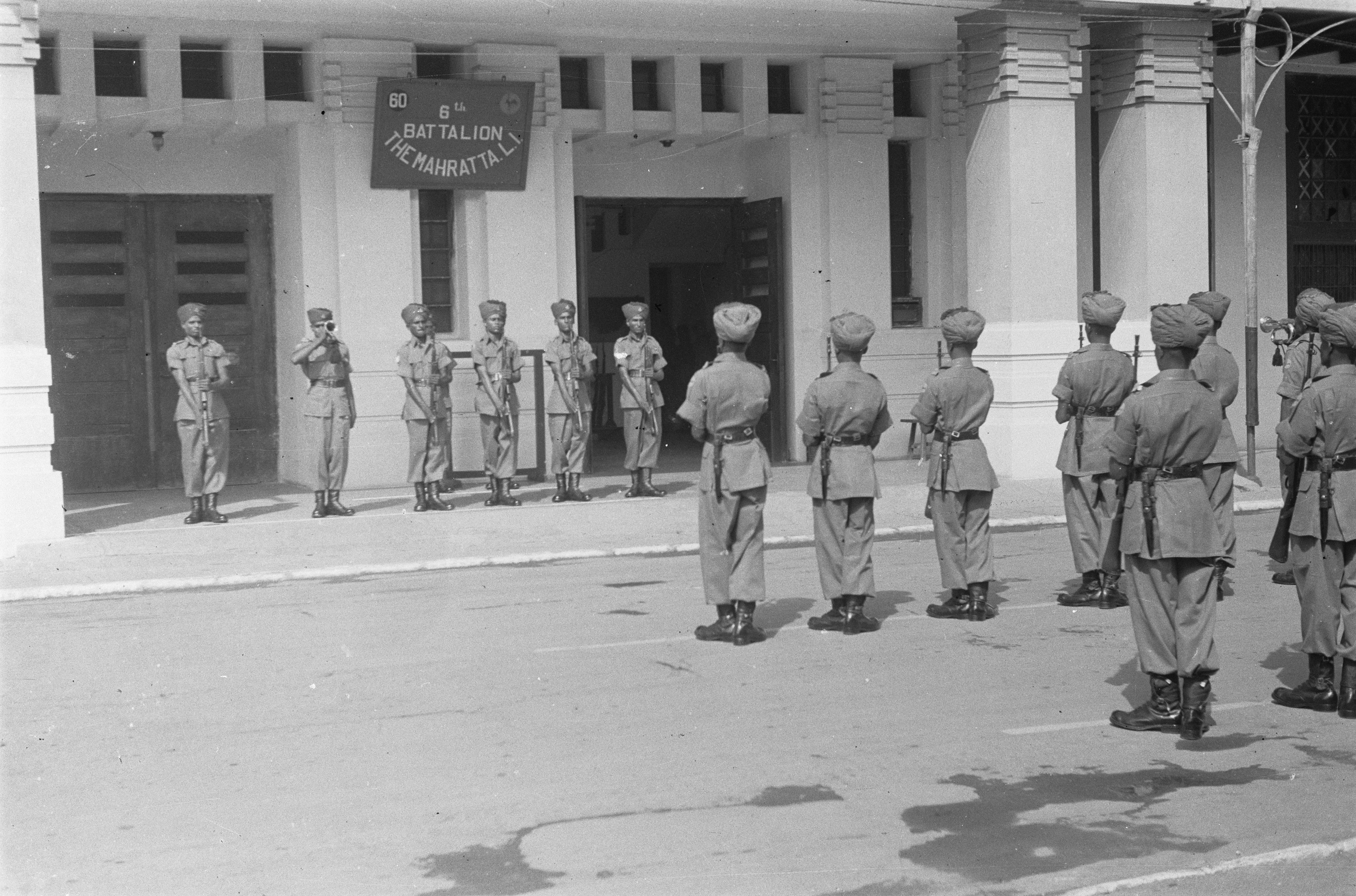
6/5th Mahratta Light Infantry in Jakarta, Java

== Burma ==
At the same time, the 9th Division was sent to reinforce Malaya, in the spring of 1941, an infantry brigade was sent to reinforce Burma followed by a second brigade later in the year. On 8 December, the Japanese Army invaded Burma from Siam. Withdrawing to India, the last British and Indian escaped from Burma in July 1942.

=== Japanese conquest of Burma ===
The Battle of Bilin River was fought in February 1942, by the 17th Indian Infantry Division. The 17th Division held the Japanese at the Bilin River for two days of close-quarters jungle fighting. The Japanese tactics were to outflank, and eventually with encirclement imminent, they were given permission to fall back. The division disengaged under cover of darkness and began a 30 miles (48 km) retreat along the dusty track to the Sittang bridge. The Battle of Sittang Bridge followed after which 17th Division lost most of its artillery, vehicles and other heavy equipment. Its infantry manpower was 3,484 just over 40% of its establishment, though it was already well under-strength before the battle started. The Battle of Pegu in March was carried out by the surviving elements of the 17th Division and the 7th British Armoured Brigade, which had just arrived from the Middle East. In April, the Battle of Yenangyaung was fought between the 7th Armoured Brigade, 48th Indian Infantry Brigade and 1st Burma Division for control of the Yenangyaung oil fields. The Japanese suffered heavy casualties during the battle, but the Allied forces were too weak to hold the oil fields and had to retreat to the north. The fighting retreat to India, was successfully completed in May just before the monsoons would have cut them off. Approximately 12,000 of the 40,000 Indian prisoners of war who were captured either during the Malayan campaign or surrendered at Singapore were led by Mohan Singh as the First Indian National Army which was dissolved in December 1942.

=== Burma campaign 1943 ===
The Arakan campaign, which began in December 1942, conducted by what at the time was an improvised formation 14th Indian Infantry Division was a failure. The average British and Indian soldier was not properly trained for fighting in jungle, which together with repeated defeats adversely affected morale. This was exacerbated by poor administration in the rear areas. Drafts of reinforcements sent to replace casualties were found in some cases to have not even completed basic training. There were also questions asked about the ability of the Indian Army's high command, which led to the creation of the position of Supreme Allied Commander South East Asia Command, leaving the army high command to concentrate on internal security and administration. There was continual patrol activity and low-key fighting south of Imphal, but neither army possessed the resources to mount decisive operations. 17th Division held positions around the town of Tiddim 100 miles (160 km) south of Imphal, and skirmished with units of the 33rd Japanese Division. The Japanese had a shorter and easier supply line from the port of Kalewa on the Chindwin River and had the upper hand for most of 1942 and 1943.

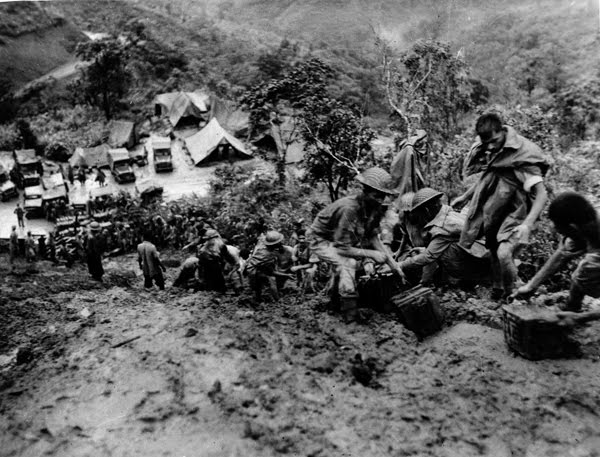
Moving ammunition in muddy conditions on road to Tamu

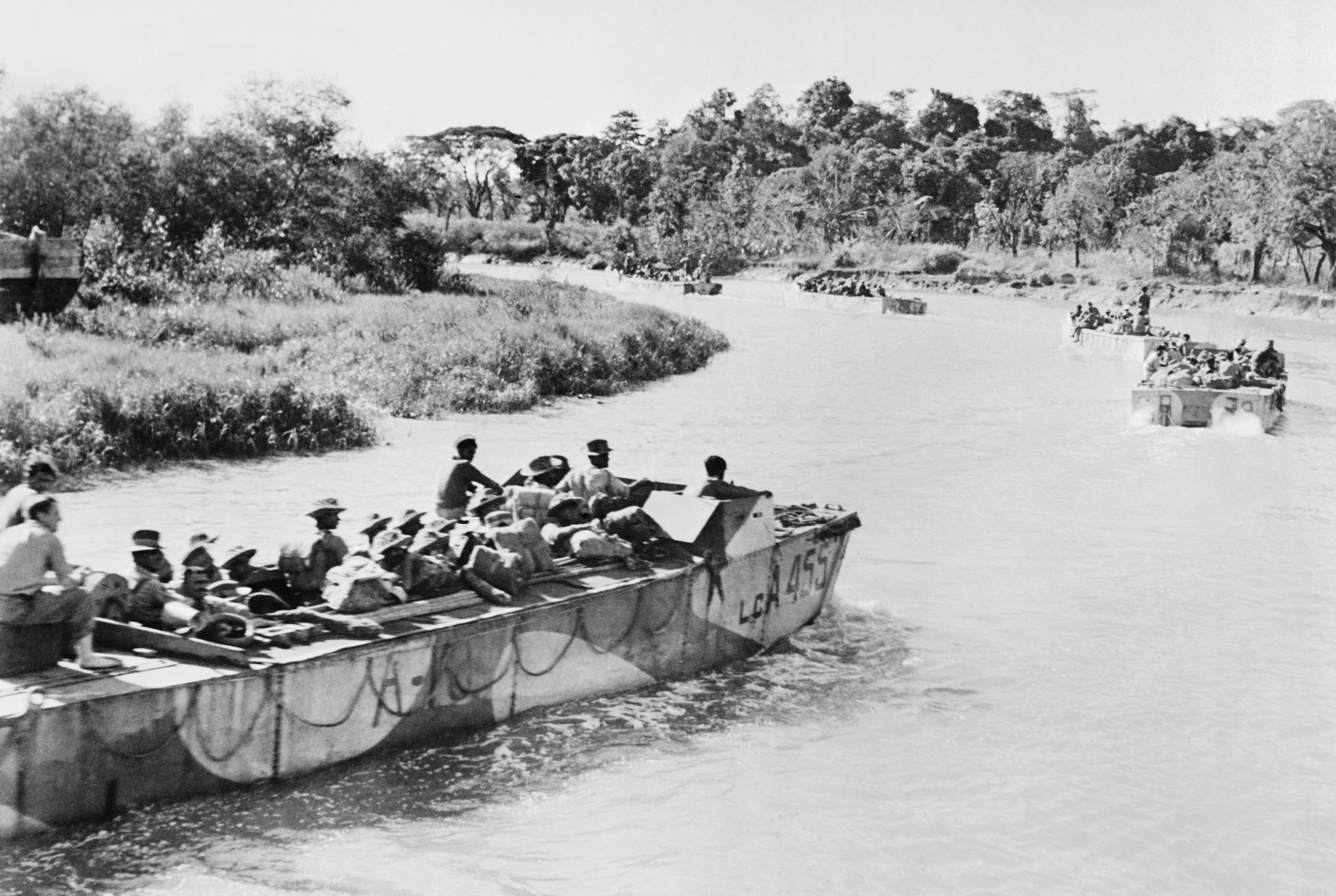
Indian landing craft advance along tributary of Kaladan

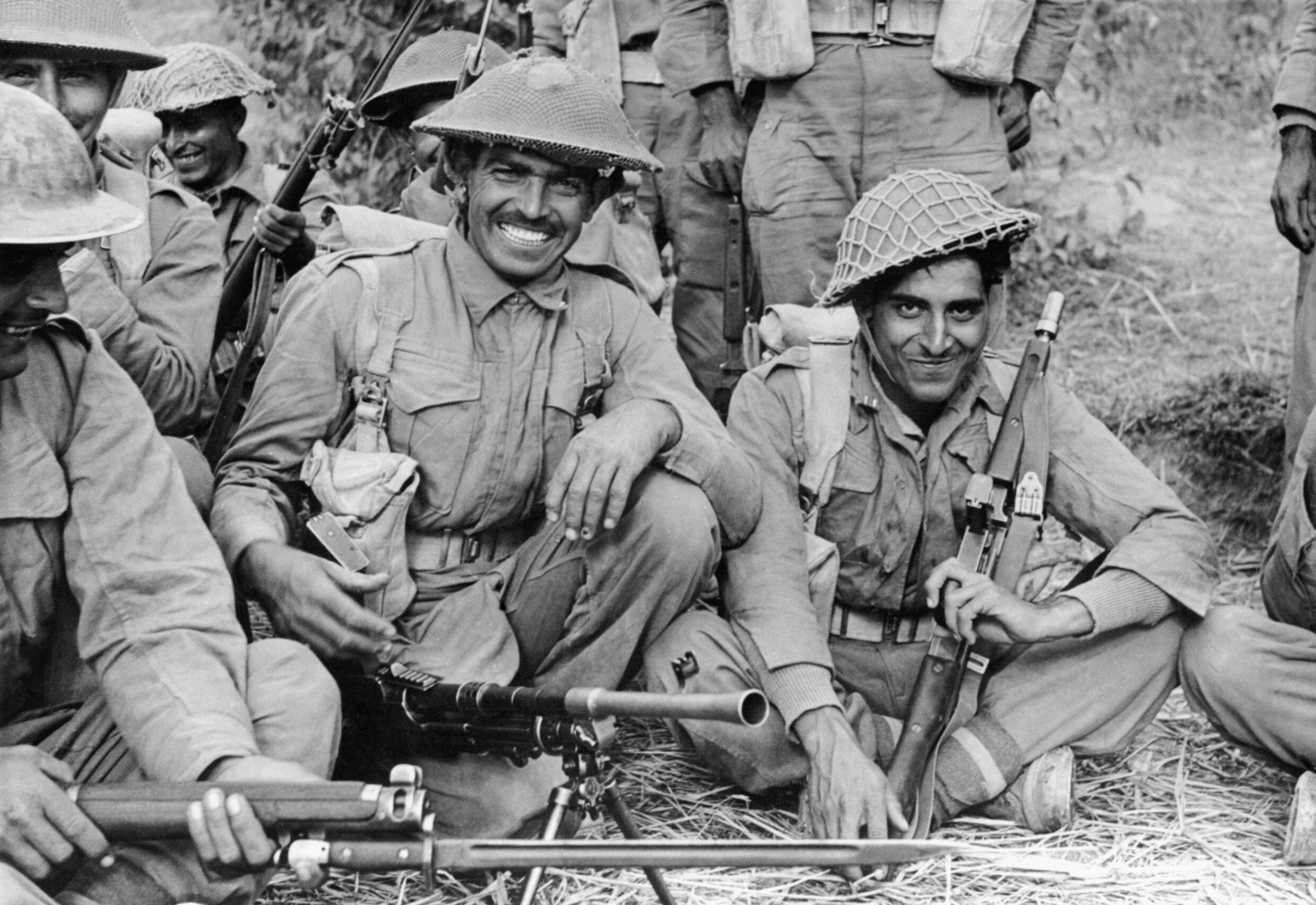
7th Rajputs about to go on patrol in Arakan

=== Burma campaign 1944 ===
The Battle of the Admin Box (5th, 7th and 26th Indian, 81st (West Africa) Division, 36th British Division) in February, came after a limited allied offensive. The Japanese had infiltrated the widely dispersed lines of the 7th Division. They then moved north undetected across the Kalapanzin River, and swung west and south, and attacked the HQ of the 7th Division. The forward divisions were ordered to dig in and hold their positions rather than retreat, while the reserve divisions advanced to their relief. On the ground, the fighting for the Admin Box was severe and Japanese fire caused heavy casualties in the crowded defences and twice set ammunition dumps on fire. However, all attempts to overrun the defenders were thwarted by the tanks of the 25th Dragoons. Although Allied casualties were higher than the Japanese, the Japanese had been forced to abandon many of their wounded to die. For the first time in the Burma Campaign, the Japanese tactics had been countered and turned against them and British and Indian soldiers had held and defeated a major Japanese attack.

The Battle of Imphal and the Battle of Sangshak (17th, 20th, 23rd Indian Divisions, 50th Indian Parachute Brigade and 254th Indian Tank Brigade) took place in the region around the city of Imphal, the capital of the state of Manipur in North-East India from March until July 1944. The Japanese army and the Indian National Army attempted to destroy the Allied forces at Imphal and invade India, but were driven back into Burma with heavy losses.

The Battle of Kohima (50th Indian Parachute Brigade and 5th, 7th Indian and 2nd British Divisions) was the turning point of the Japanese U Go offensive. The Japanese attempted to capture Kohima ridge, a feature which dominated the road by which the major British and Indian troops at Imphal were supplied. British and Indian reinforcements counter-attacked to drive the Japanese from the positions they had captured. The Japanese abandoned the ridge, but continued to block the Kohima-Imphal road. From 16 May to 22 June, the British and Indian troops pursued the retreating Japanese and reopened the road. The battle ended on 22 June when British and Indian troops from Kohima and Imphal met at Milestone 109.

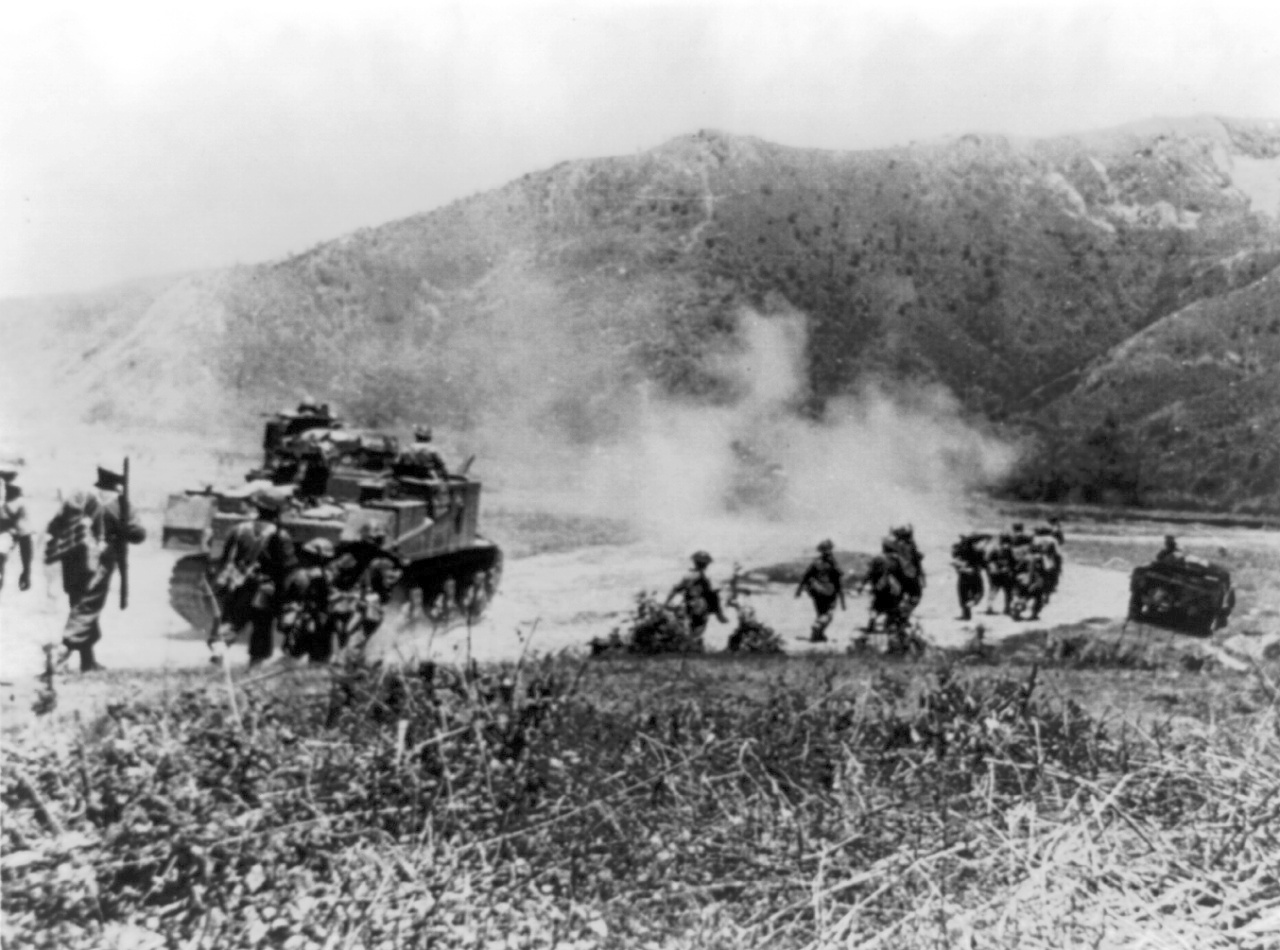
Gurkhas advance with Lee tanks on Imphal-Kohima road

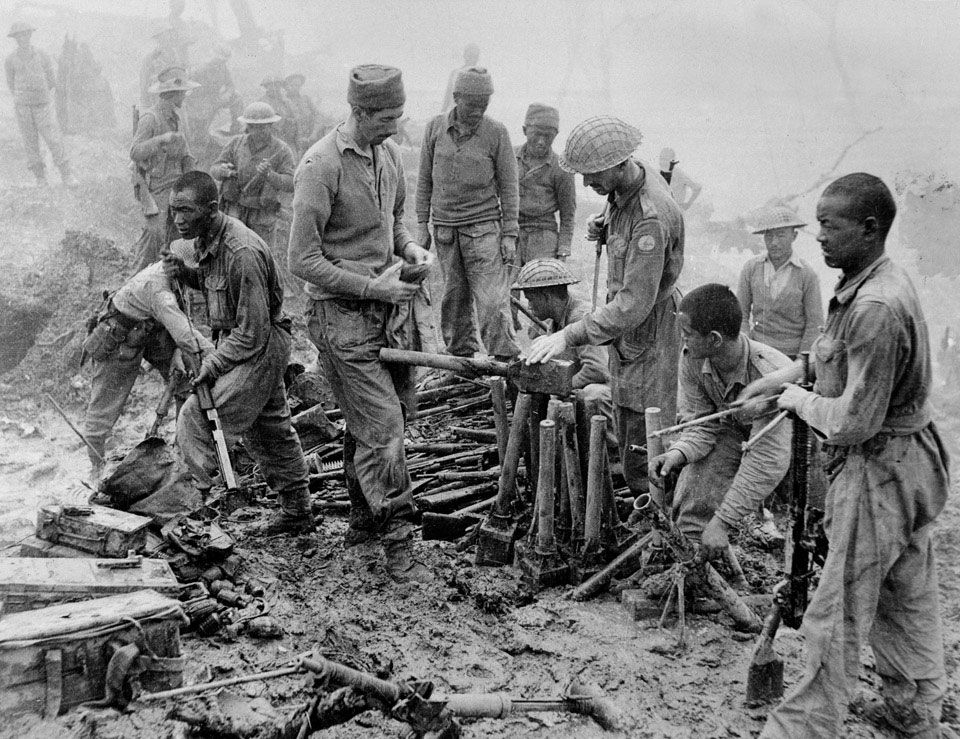
Indian troops inspect captured Japanese ordnance

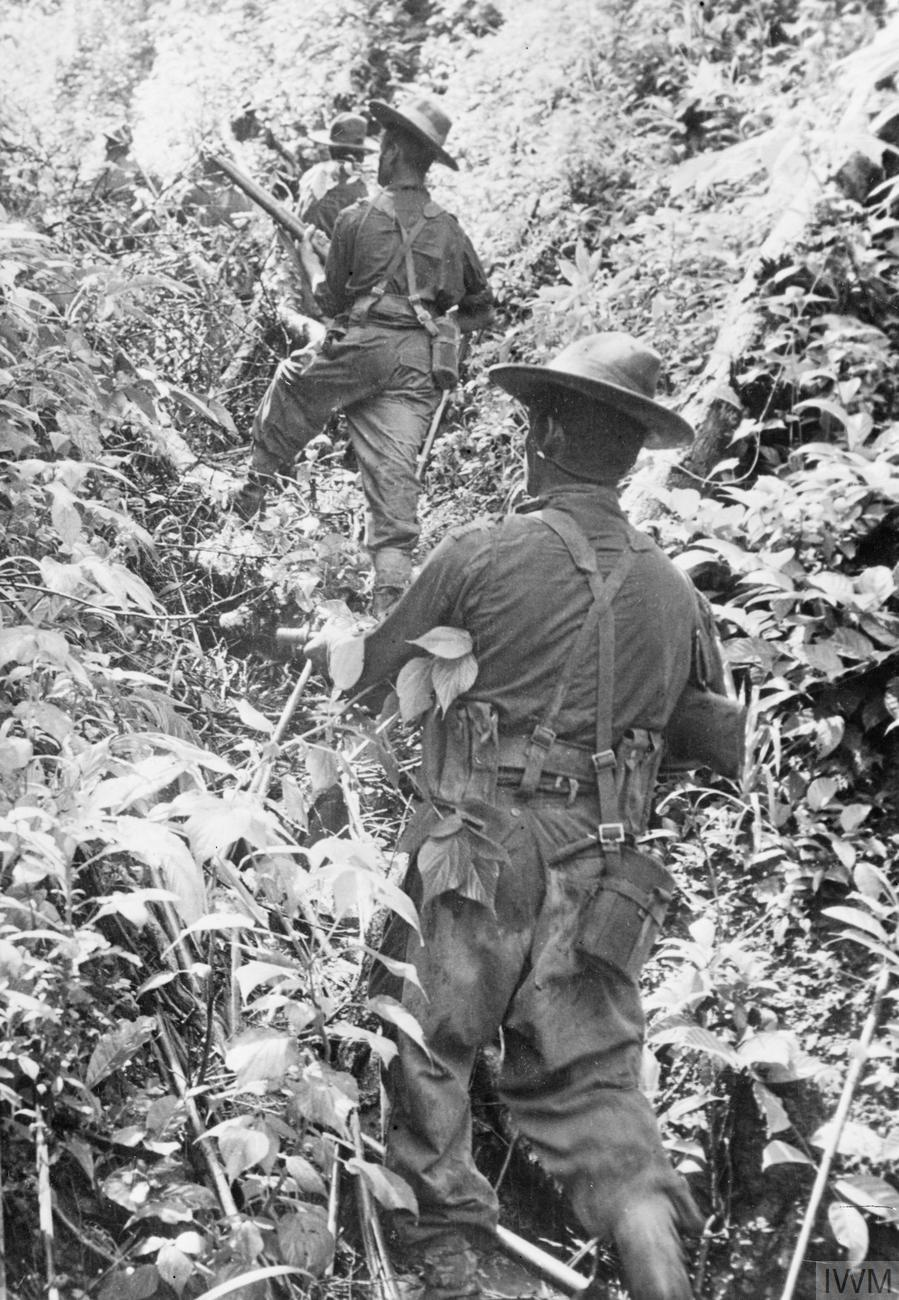
Garhwal Rifles patrol jungle in Burma

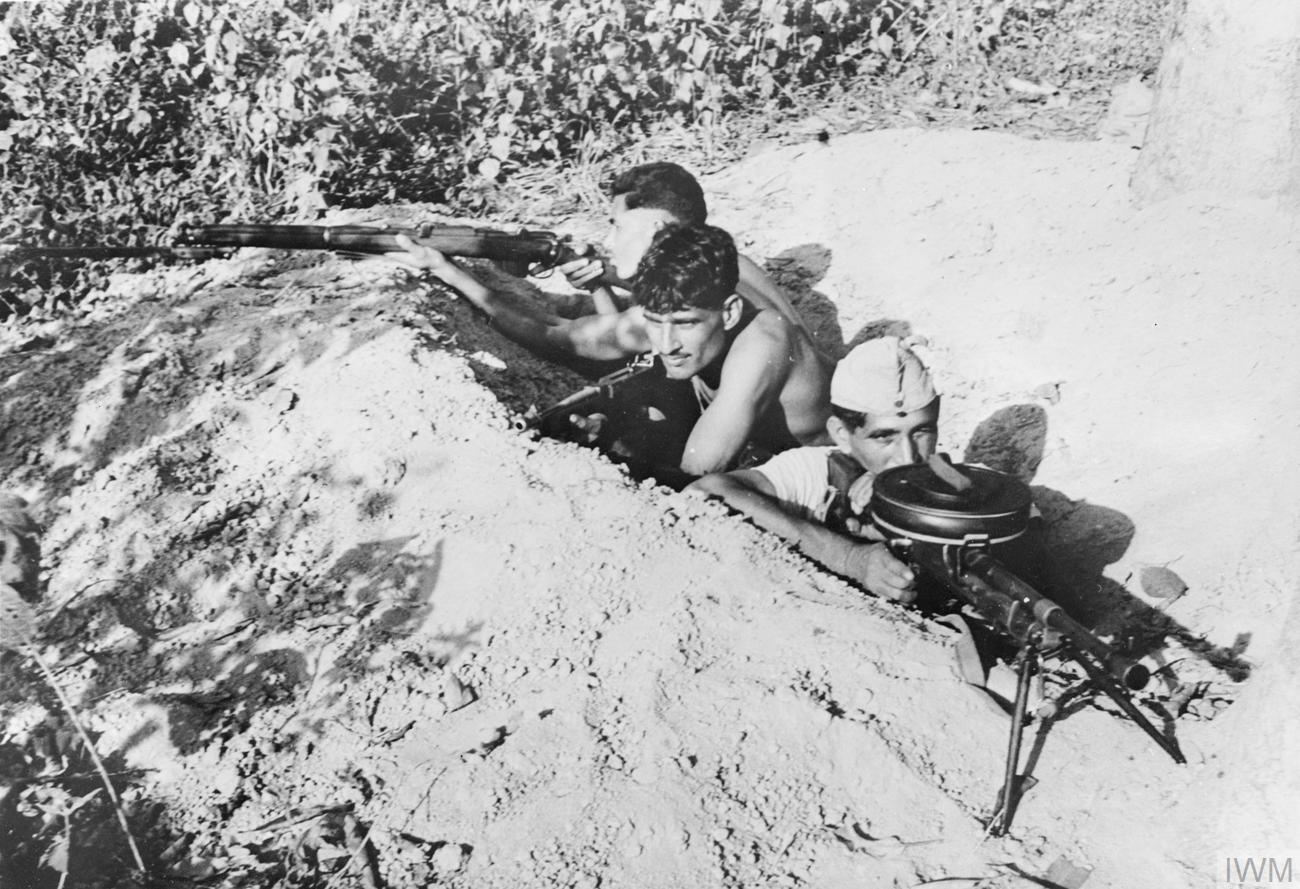
Indian trench in Arakan

=== Burma campaign 1945 ===
The Battle of Meiktila and Mandalay (5th, 7th, 17th, 19th, and 20th Indian divisions, 2nd British Division, and 254th and 255th Indian Tank Brigades) between January and March 1945, were decisive battles near the end of the Burma Campaign. Despite logistical difficulties, the Allies were able to deploy large armoured and mechanised forces in Central Burma, and also possessed air supremacy. Most of the Japanese forces in Burma were destroyed during the battles, allowing the Allies to later recapture the capital, Rangoon, and reoccupy most of the country with little organised opposition.

The Battle of Ramree Island (26th Indian Infantry Division) was fought for six weeks during January and February 1945, as part of the XV Indian Corps 1944–45 offensive on the Southern Front of the Burma Campaign. Ramree Island lies off the Burma coast and was captured along with the rest of Southern Burma, during the early stages of the Campaign, by the rapidly advancing Imperial Japanese Army in 1942. In January 1945 the Allies were able to launch attacks to retake Ramree and its neighbour Cheduba, with the intention of building sea-supplied airbases on them.

Operation Dracula and the Battle of Elephant Point (5th and 17th Infantry, and 44th Indian Airborne Division; 2nd and 36th British Divisions; and 255th Indian Tank Brigade) was the name given to an airborne and amphibious attack on Rangoon by British and Indian forces. When it was launched, the Imperial Japanese Army had already abandoned the city.

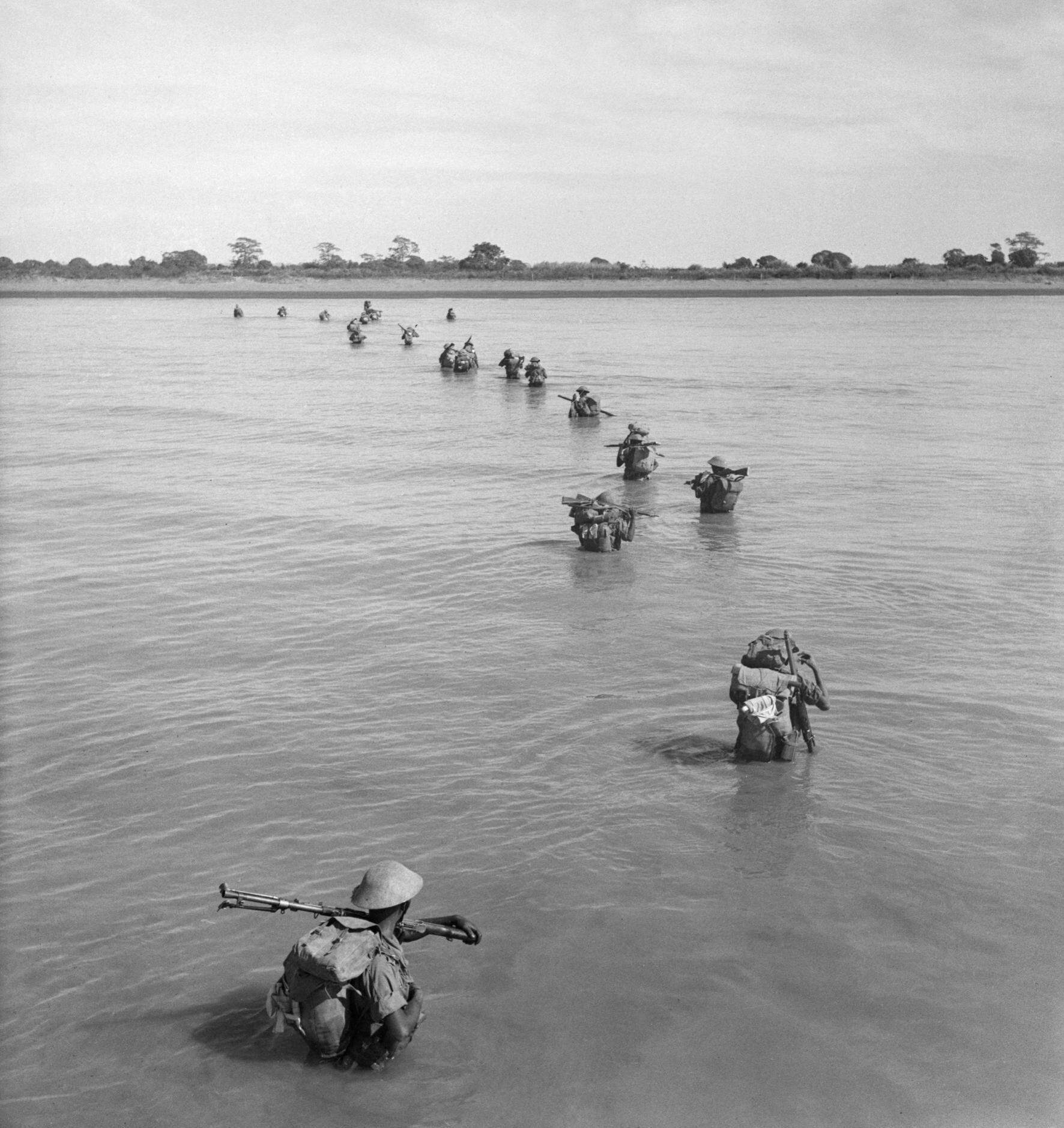
Indian soldiers wade ashore at Akyab

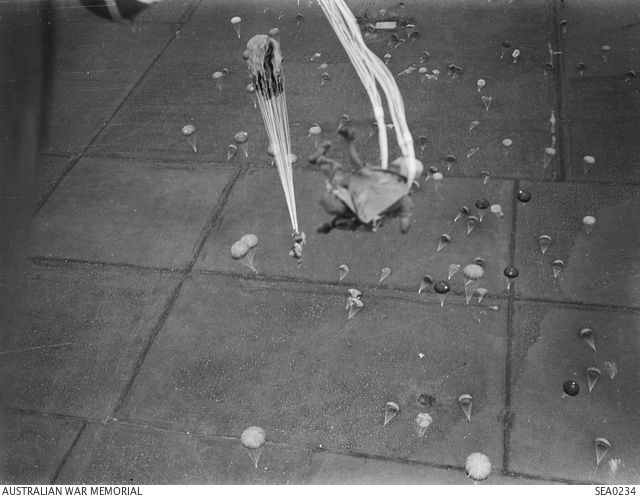
44th Airborne Division parachute to drop zone south of Rangoon

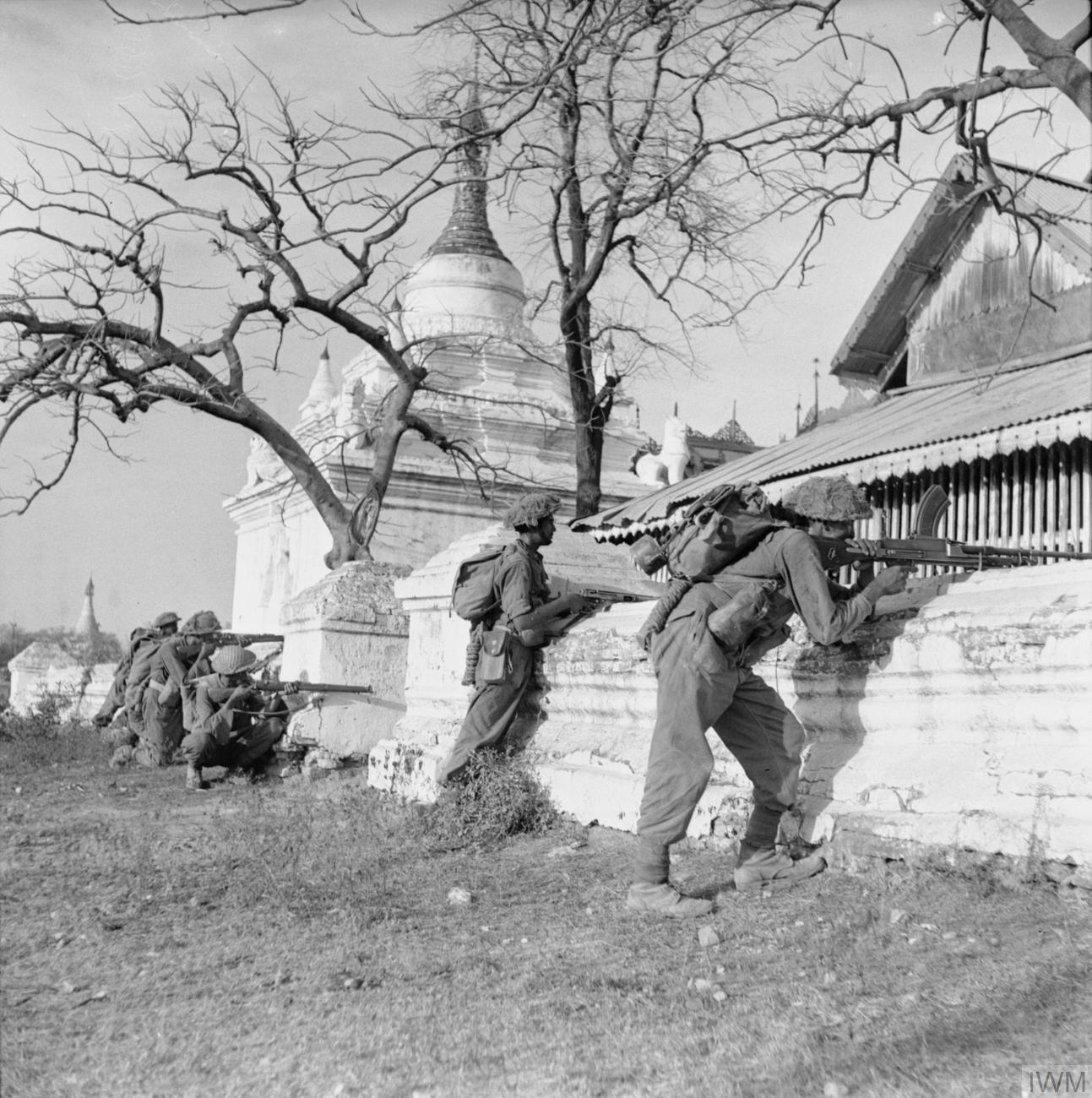
19th Division fire on Japanese strong point among pagodas on Mandalay Hill

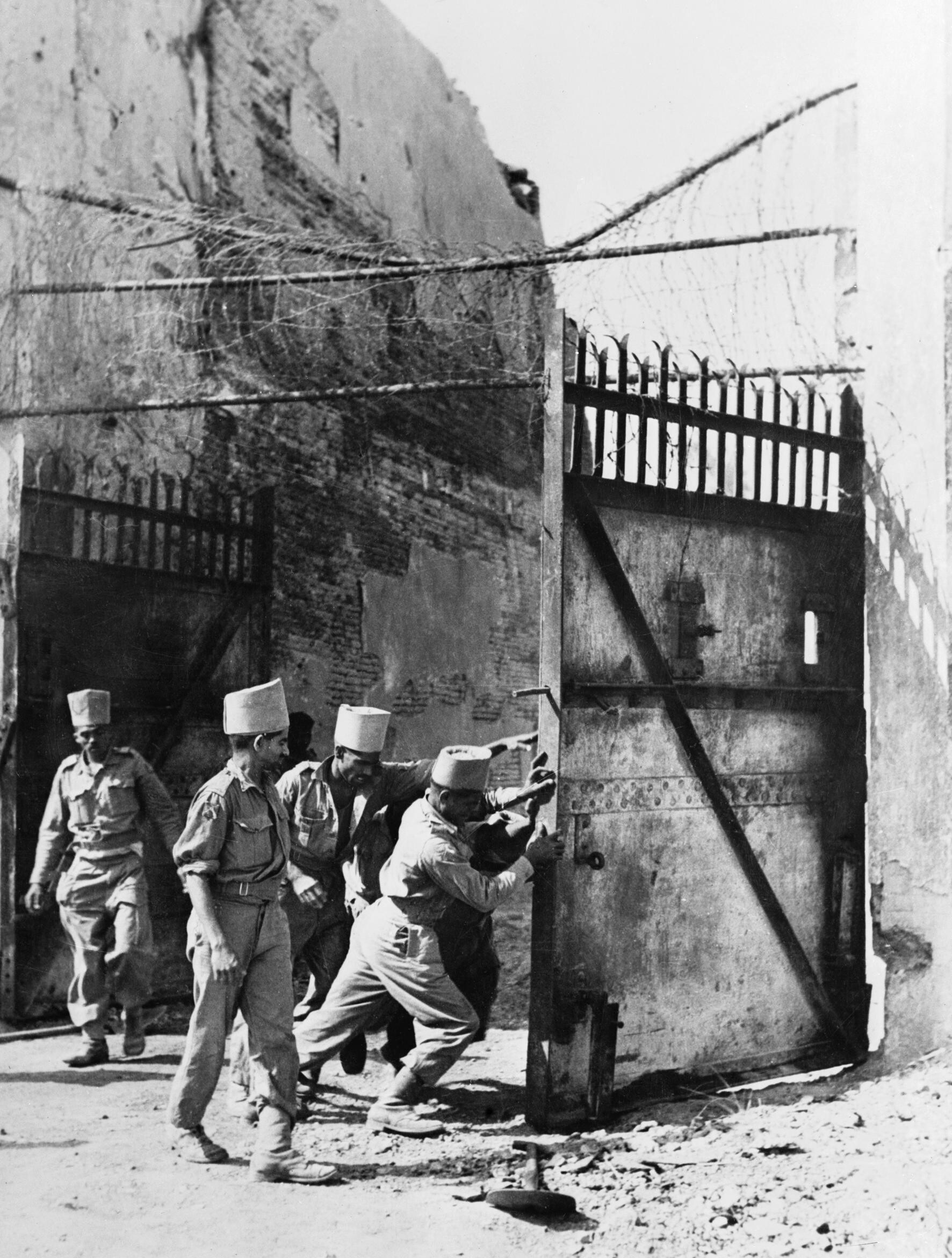
Madras Sappers open gates after capture of Fort Dufferin

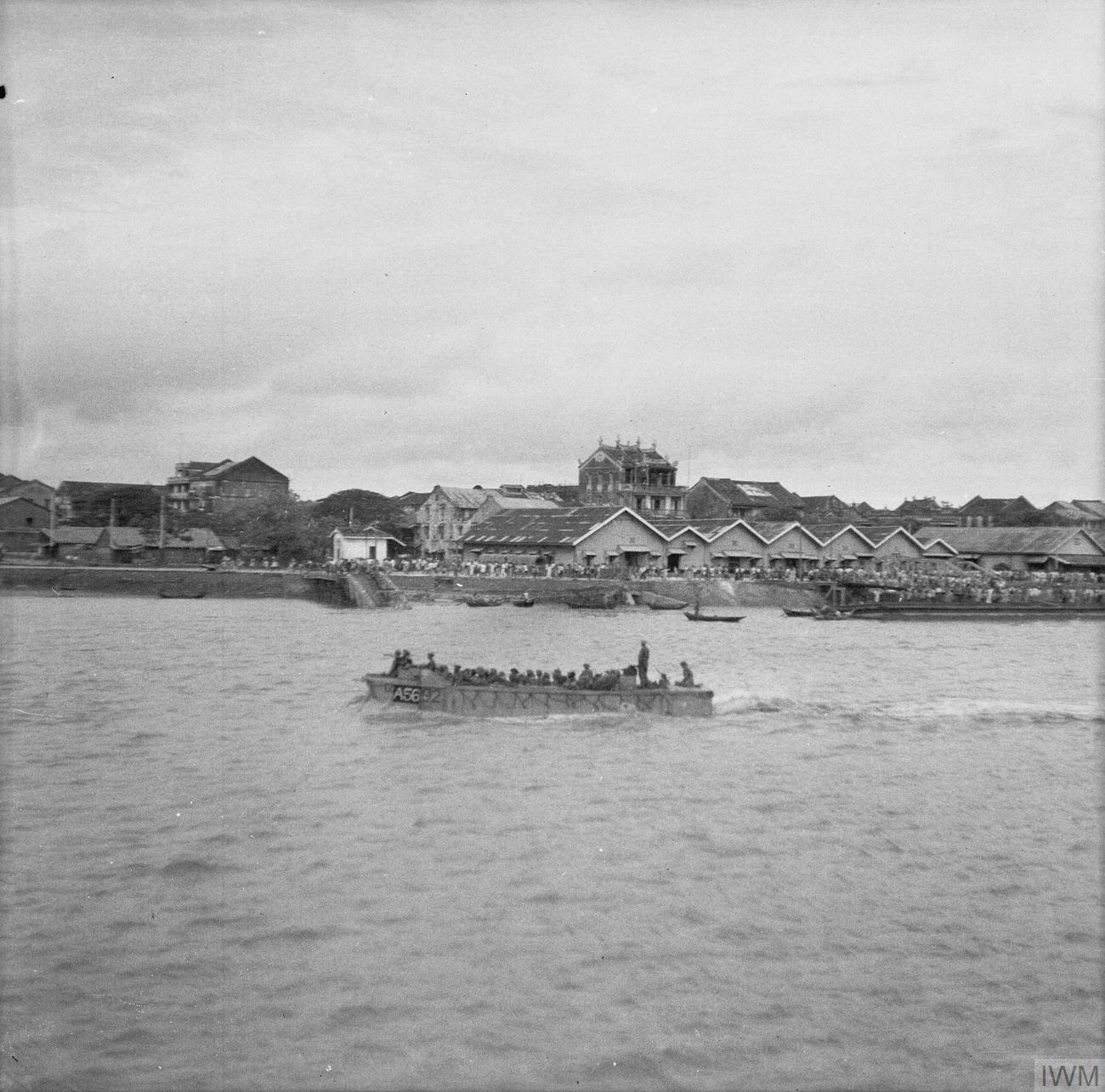
Indian landing craft enters Rangoon harbour to crowds of cheering civilians

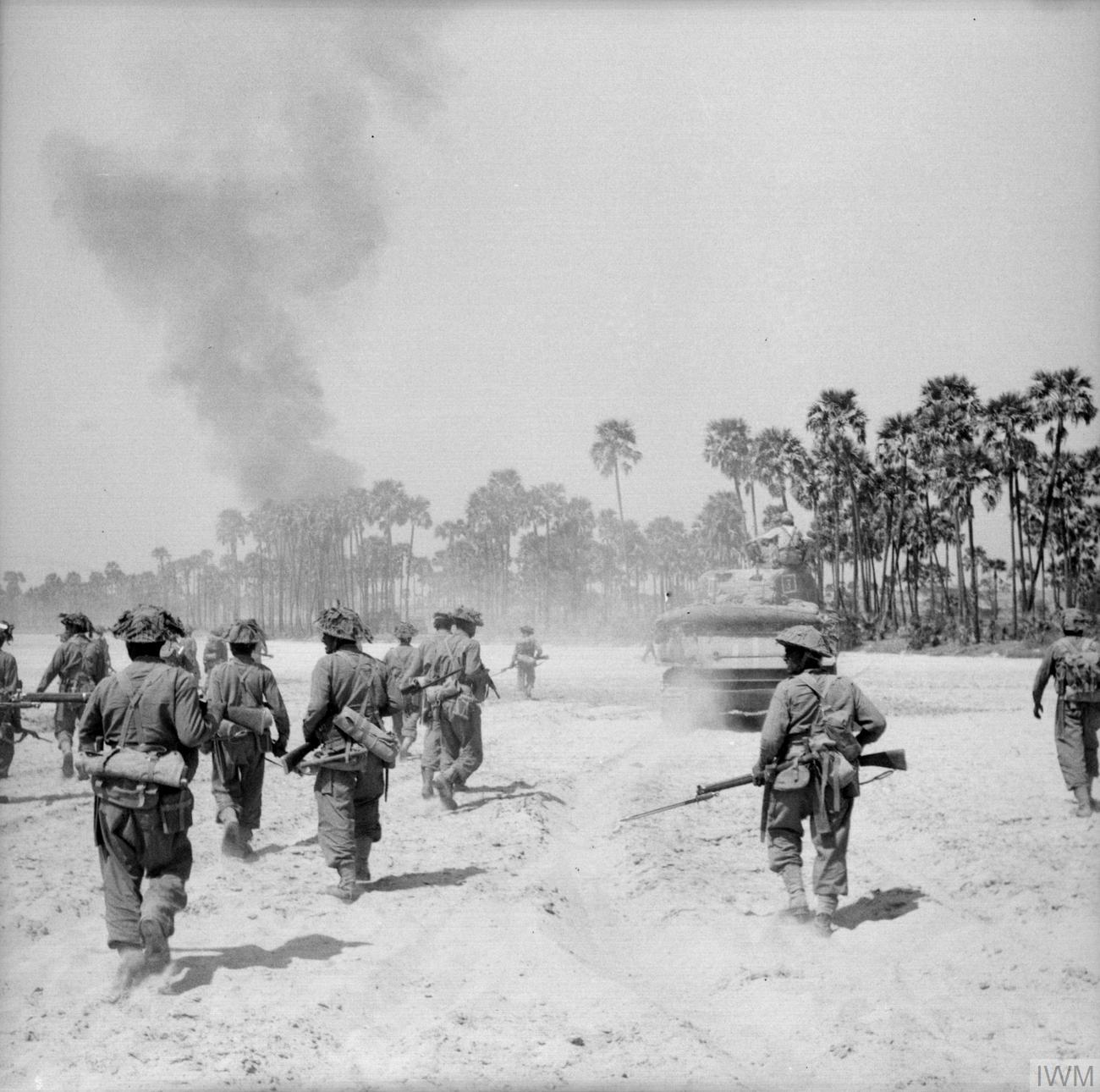
6/7th Rajputs march towards Meiktila

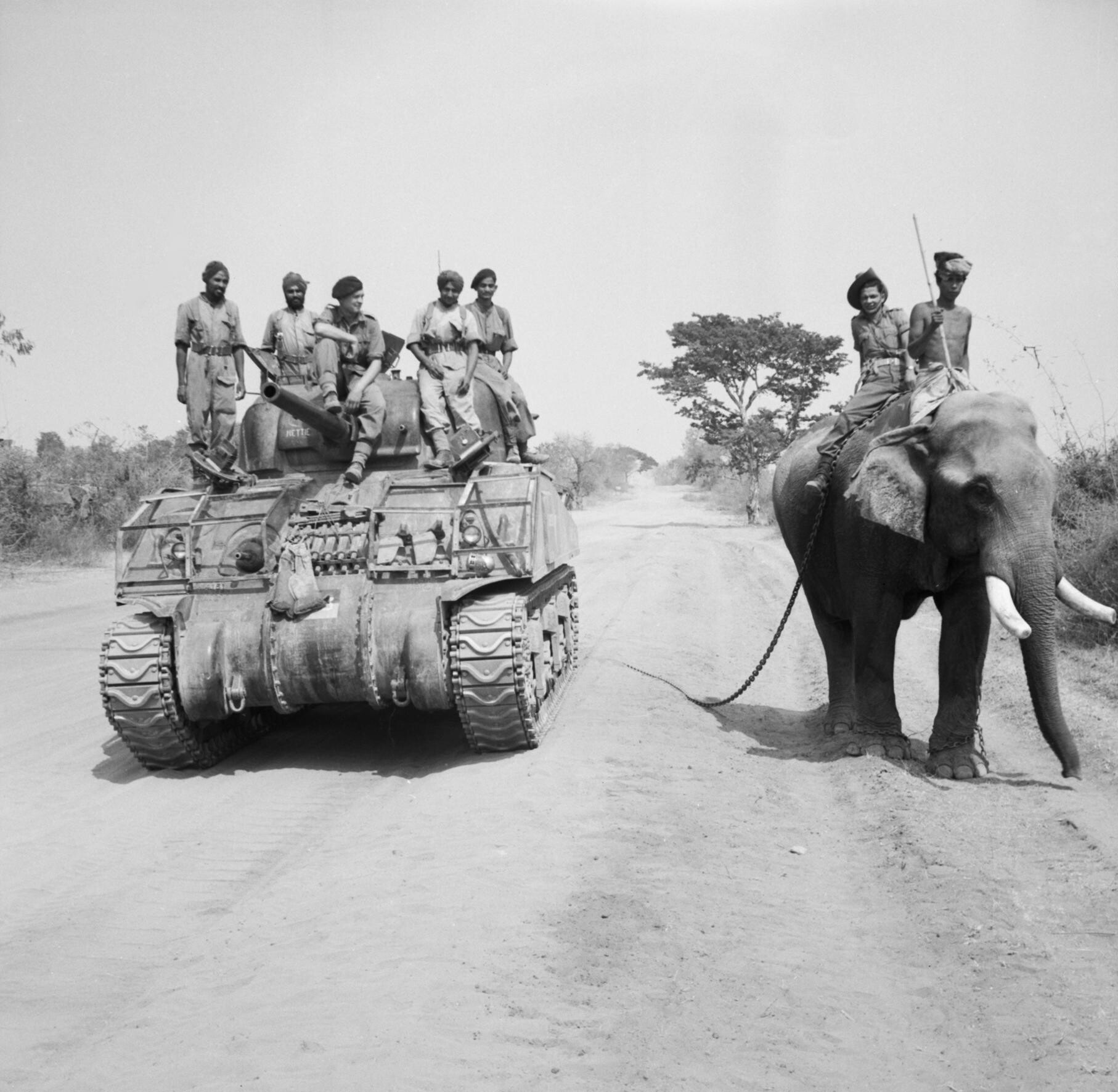
255th Indian Tank Brigade encounter elephant near Meiktila

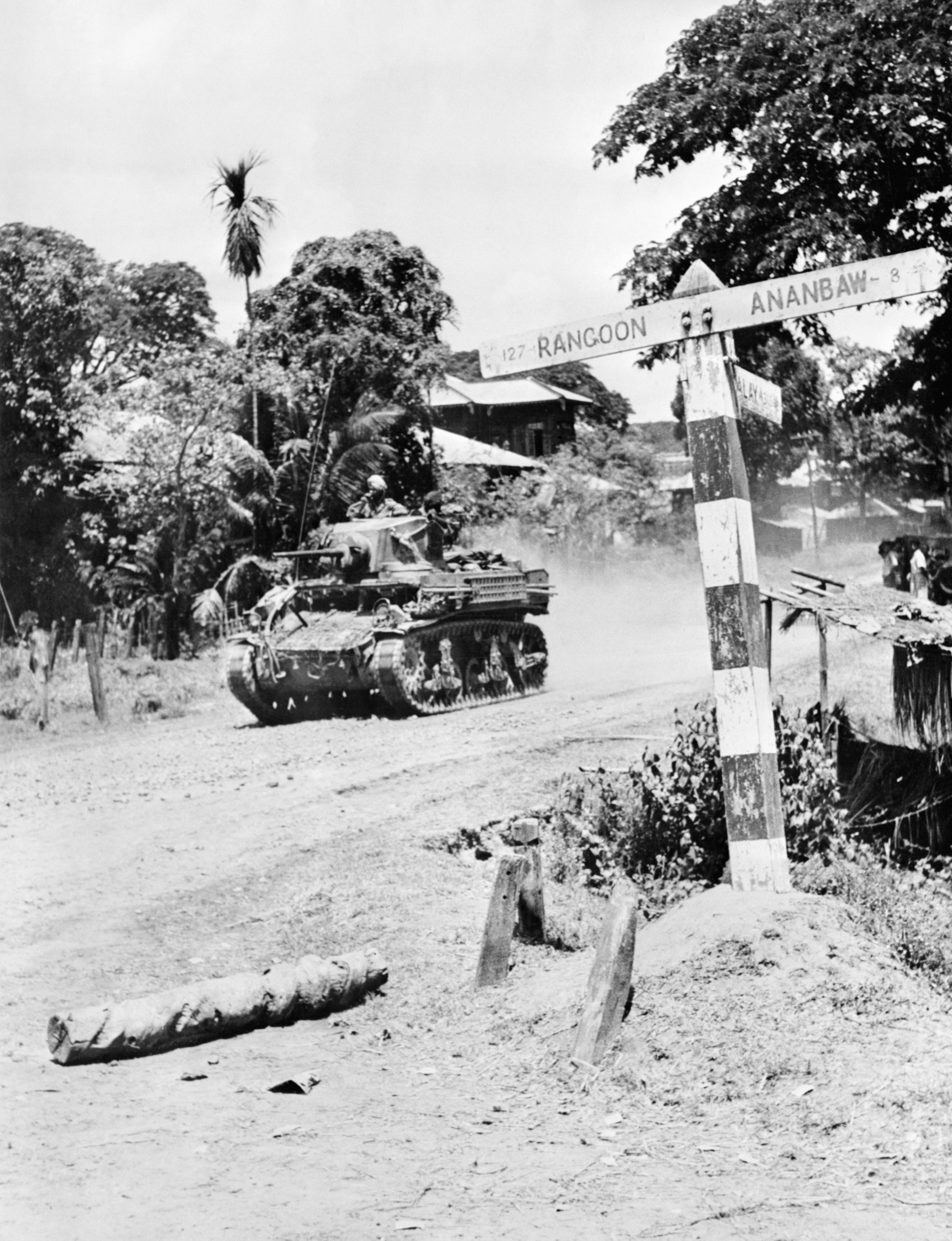
Indian Stuart tank on road to Rangoon

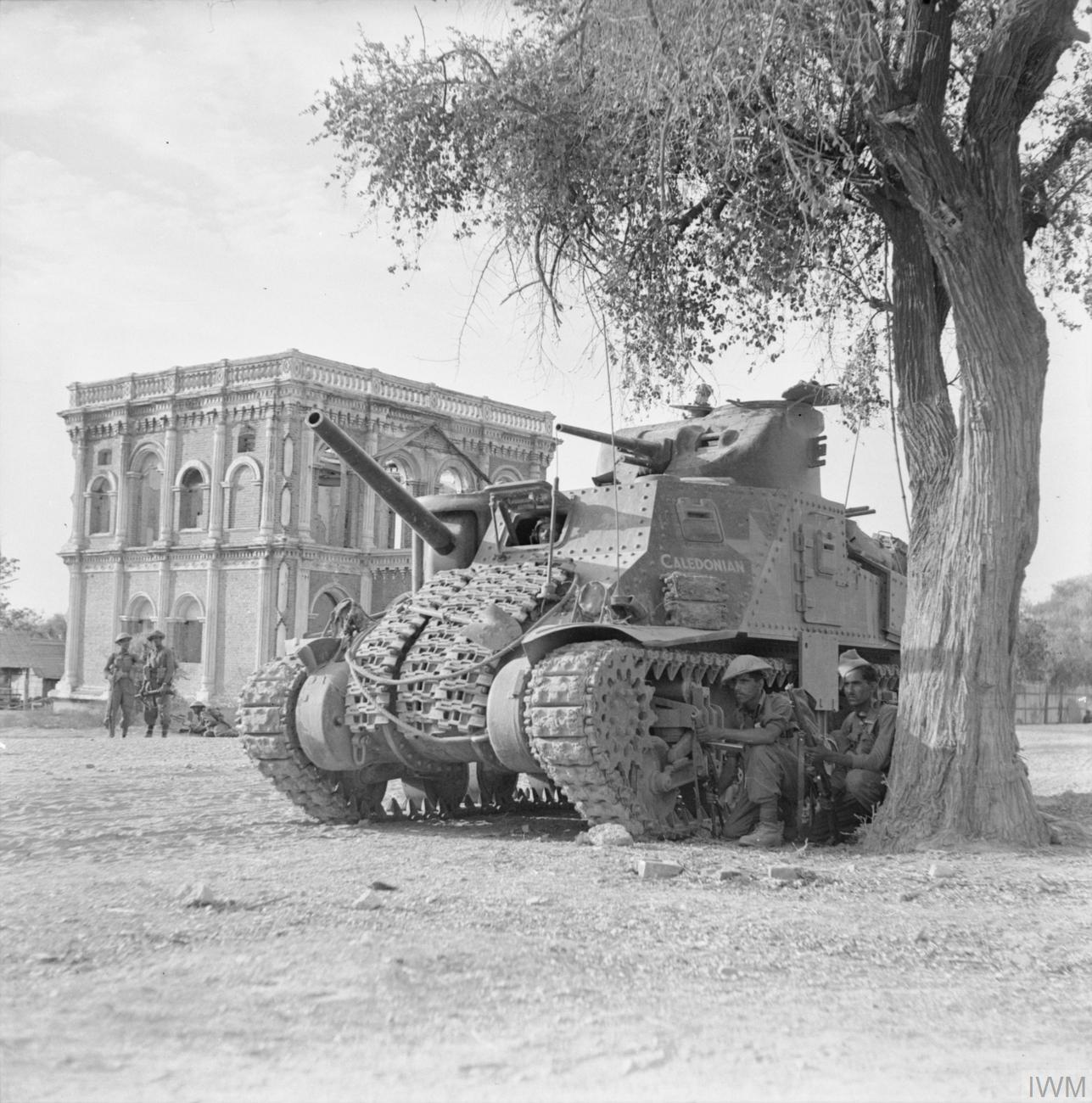
Indian troops take cover behind Lee tank during street fighting in Mandalay

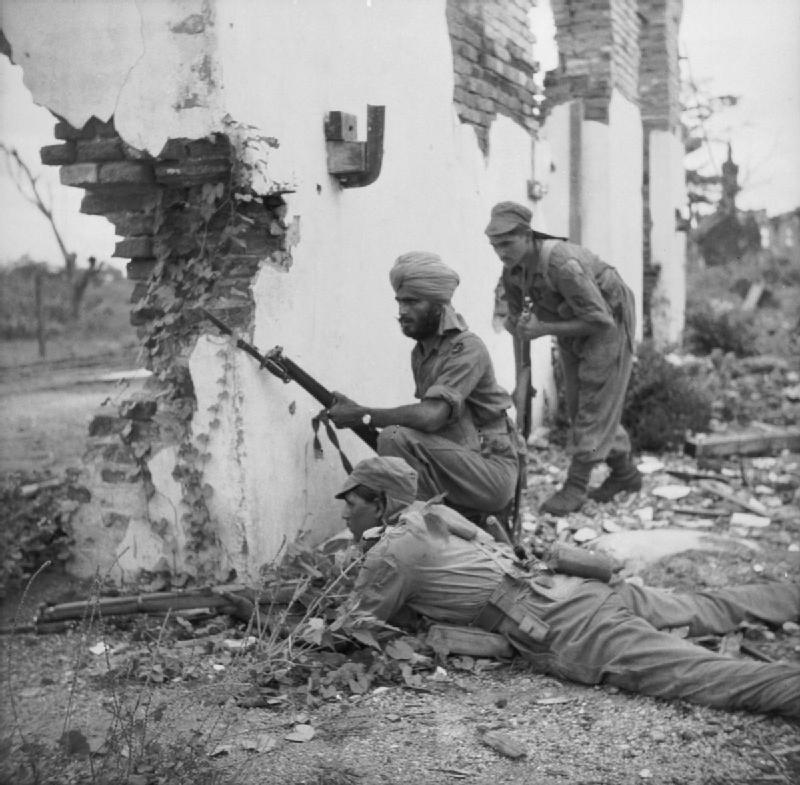
20th Division search for hidden Japanese units in Prome

== Japan ==
=== British Commonwealth Occupation Force ===
Indian Army units formed part of the British Commonwealth Occupation Force (BCOF) in occupied Japan. BCOF was responsible for supervising demilitarisation and the disposal of Japan's war industries, as well as the occupation of the western prefectures of Shimane, Yamaguchi, Tottori, Okayama, Hiroshima and Shikoku Island.

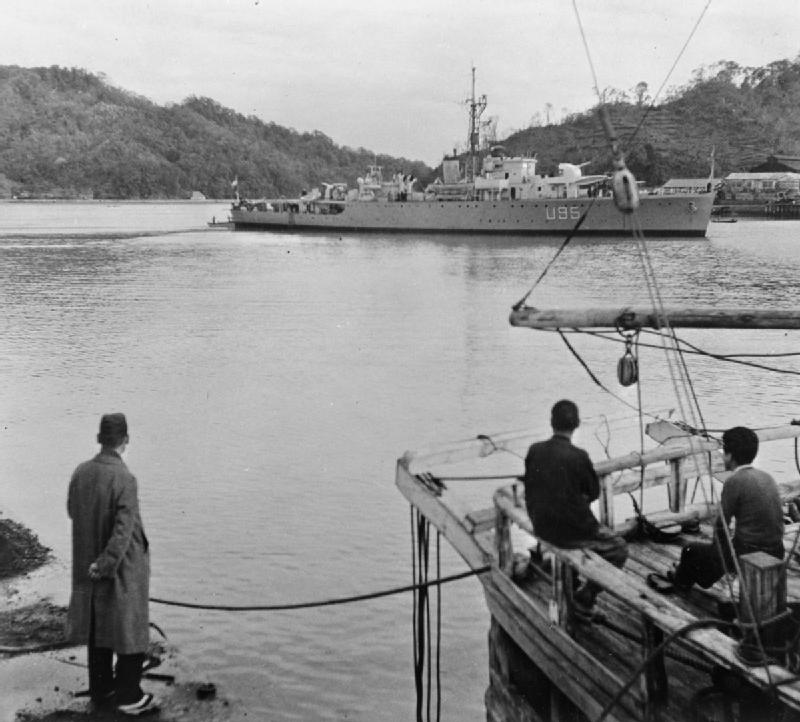
HMIS Sutlej at Kōchi, Shikoku Island, Japan

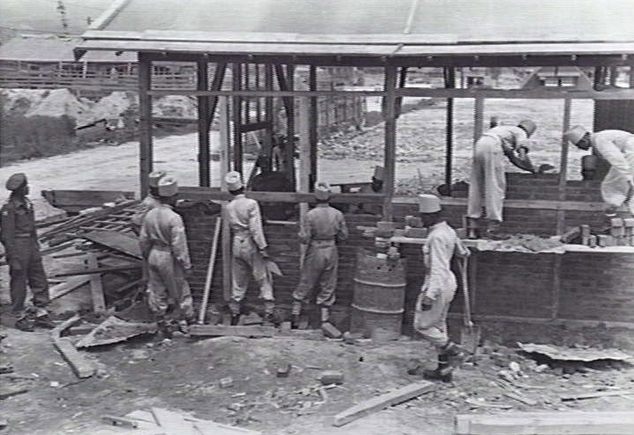
Madras Sappers construct building in Hiroo, Japan

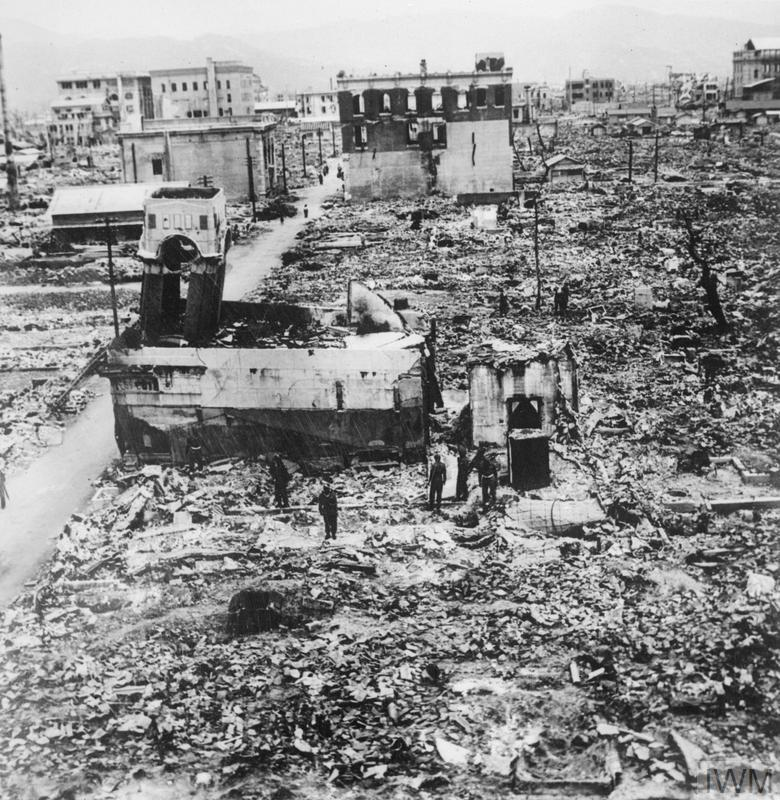
Indian soldiers survey ruins of Hiroshima

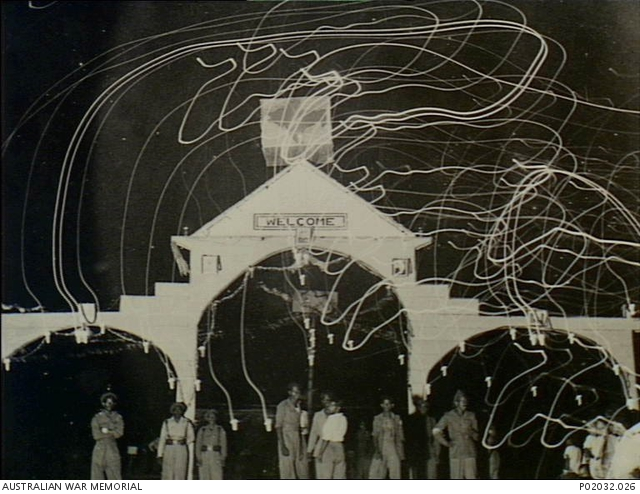
Indian troops celebrate India's Independence at BCOF base in Bofu, Japan

== Europe ==
=== France ===
In 1940, four mule companies of the British Indian Army Service Corps joined the British Expeditionary Force (BEF) in France. They were evacuated from Dunkirk with the rest of the BEF in May 1940, and were still stationed in England in July 1942.

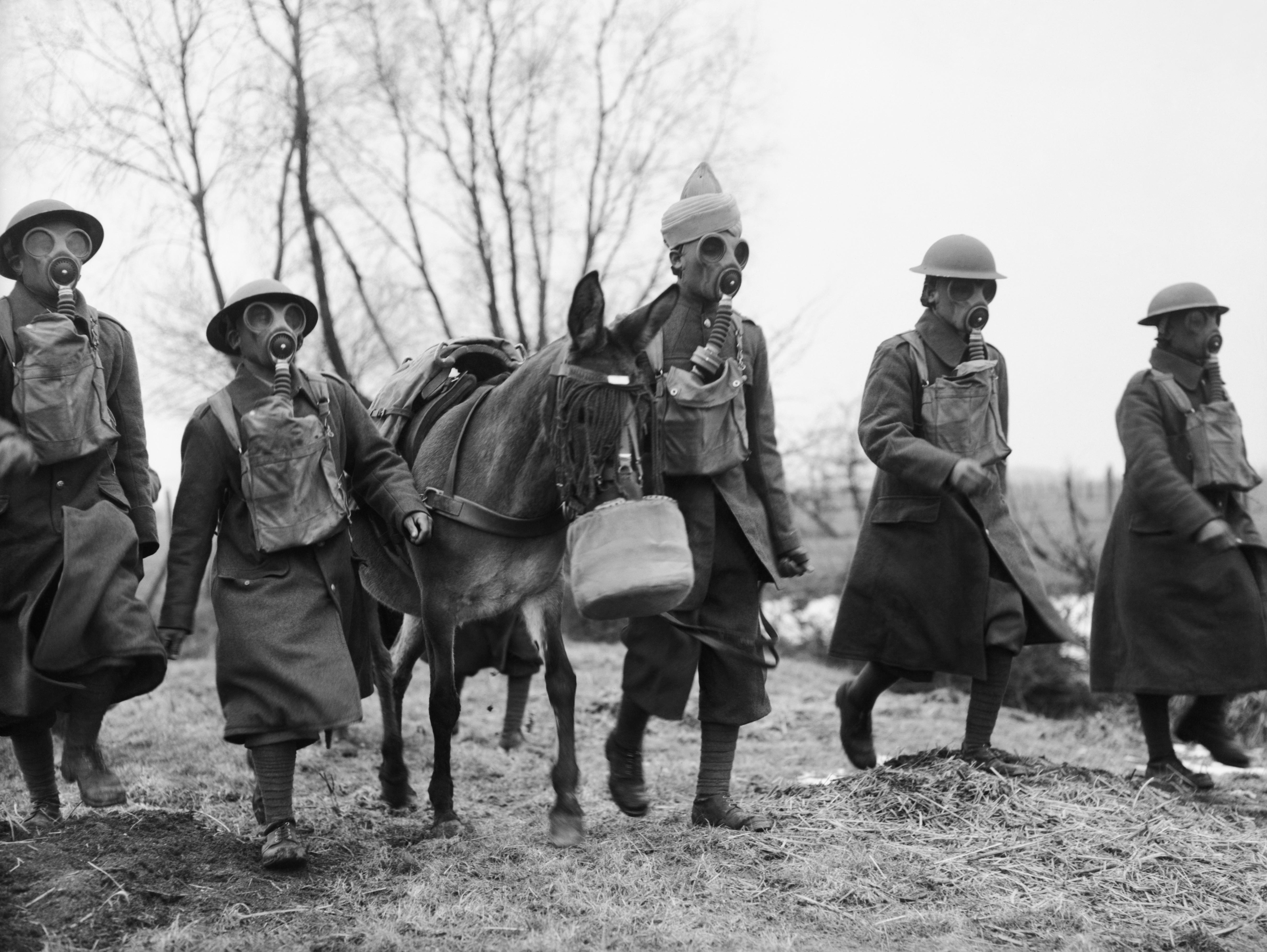
Indian muleteers and mule with gas masks in France

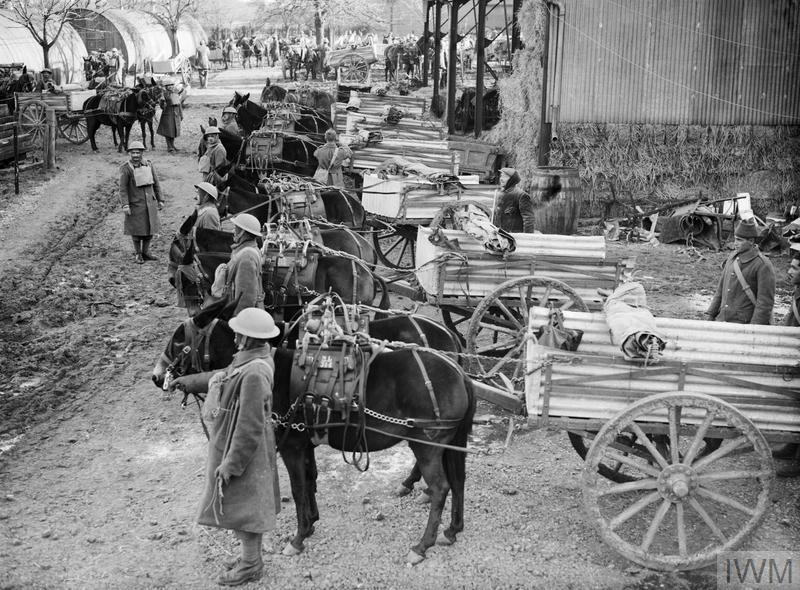
British Indian Army Service Corps on parade in France

=== Italy ===
The Allies landed in Italy on 9 September 1943. The 4th, 8th and 10th Indian Divisions and the 43rd Independent Gurkha Infantry Brigade were all involved during the campaign In October 1943, the 8th Indian Division fighting on the Adriatic front reached the Barbara Line which was breached in early November. The 8th Division led the assault on the German defensive Bernhardt Line, crossed the Sangro River and advanced to just short of Pescara where Eighth Army halted to wait for better weather in the spring.

The 4th Indian Division took part in the second battle of Monte Cassino, In the final fourth battle of Monte Cassino on 11 May, on the Eighth Army front, XIII Corps had made two strongly opposed night crossings of the Rapido by the British 4th Division and 8th Indian Infantry Division. By 18 May, the Germans had withdrawn to their next line.

The Gothic Line formed the last major line of defence in the final stages of the war along the summits of the Apennines The Gothic Line was breached on both the Adriatic and the central Apennine fronts during the Battle of Gemmano in August (4th Indian Divisions last battle before moving to Greece). On the United States Fifth Army's far right wing, on the right of the XIII Corps front, 8th Indian Division fighting across trackless ground had captured the heights of Femina Morta, and 6th British Armoured Division had taken the San Godenzo Pass on Route 67 to Forlì, both on 18 September. On 5 October, the 10th Indian Division, switched from British X Corps to British V Corps, had crossed the Fiumicino river high in the hills and turned the German defensive line on the river forcing the German Tenth Army units downstream to pull back towards Bologna.

In the 1945 spring offensive, the critical role of getting across the Senio, honeycombed with defensive tunnels and bunkers front and rear, was given to the 8th Indian Division, reprising the role they played crossing the Rapido in the final Battle of Monte Cassino. On 29 April 1945, the Germans signed an instrument of surrender; hostilities in Italy formally ceased on 2 May.

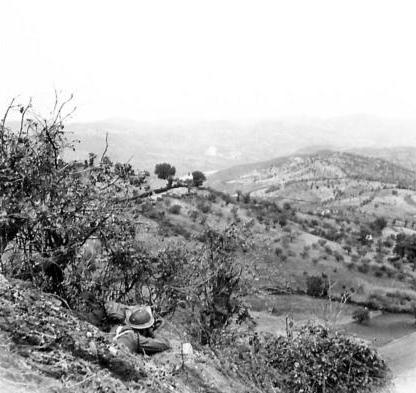
Mahratta sniper on south bank of Trigno

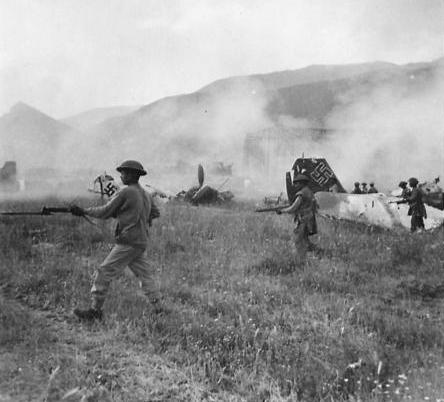
1/5th Mahratta Light Infantry advance across Aquino aerodrome

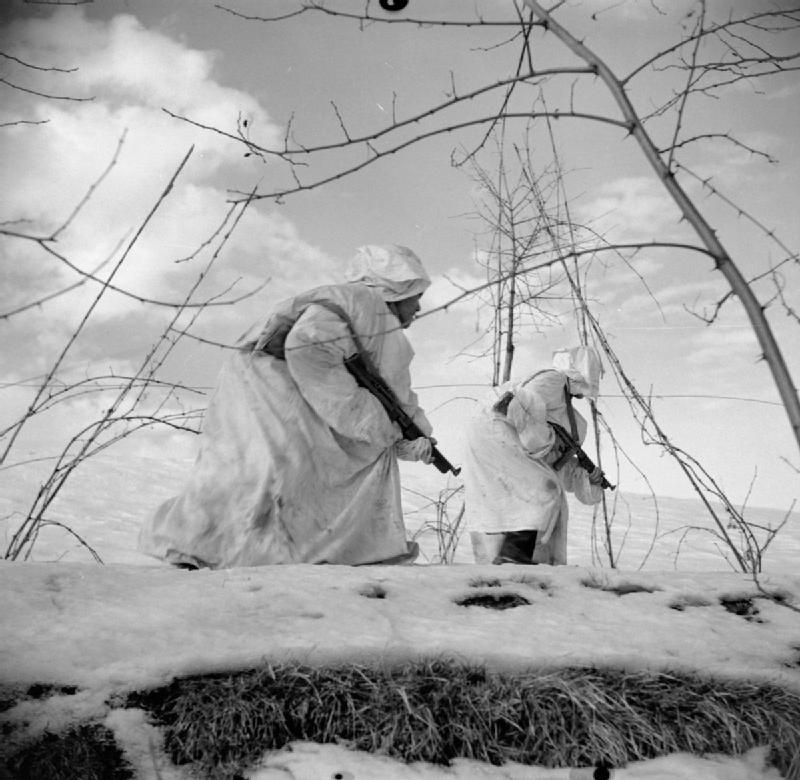
Indian troops proceed through snow near Castel Bolognese

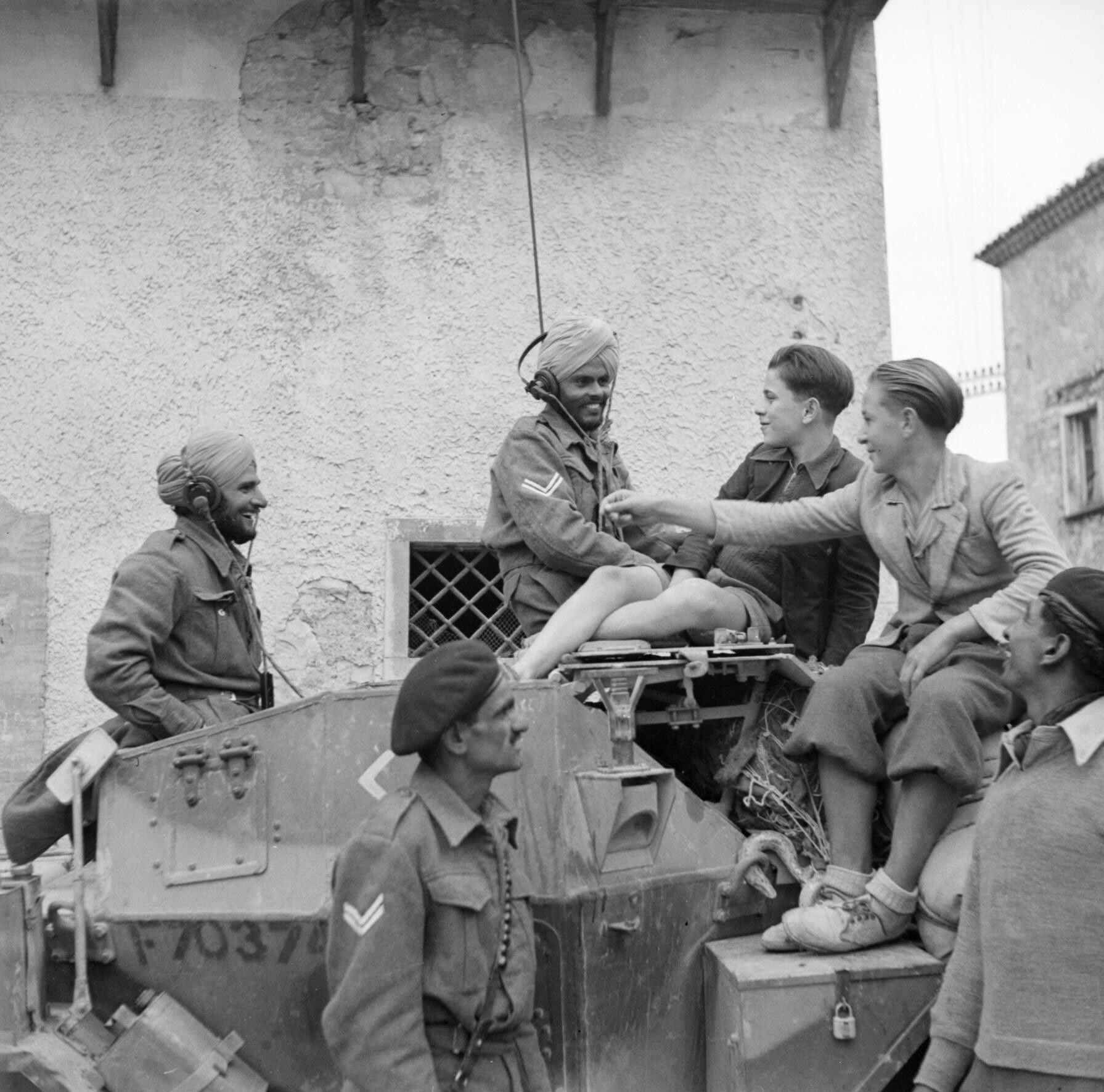
Indian Armoured Corps chat with civilians in San Felice during advance towards Sangro

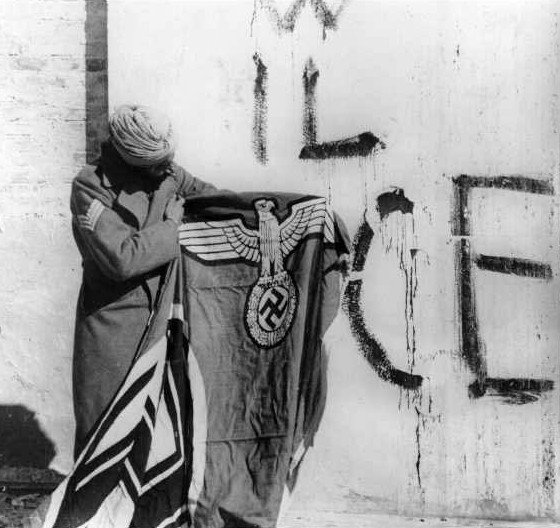
Indian soldier holds captured swastika flag after surrender of German forces in Italy

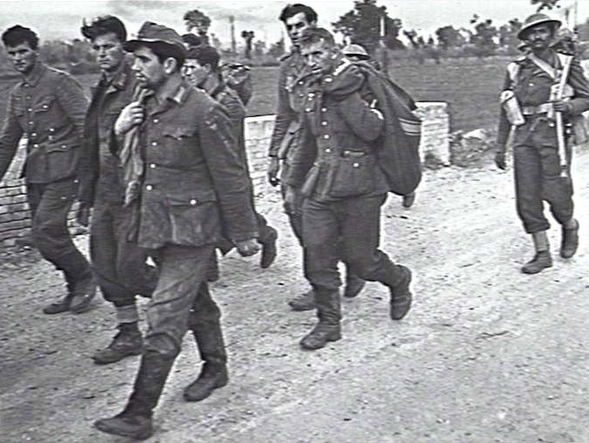
Indian soldier escorts German prisoners after Battle of the Sangro

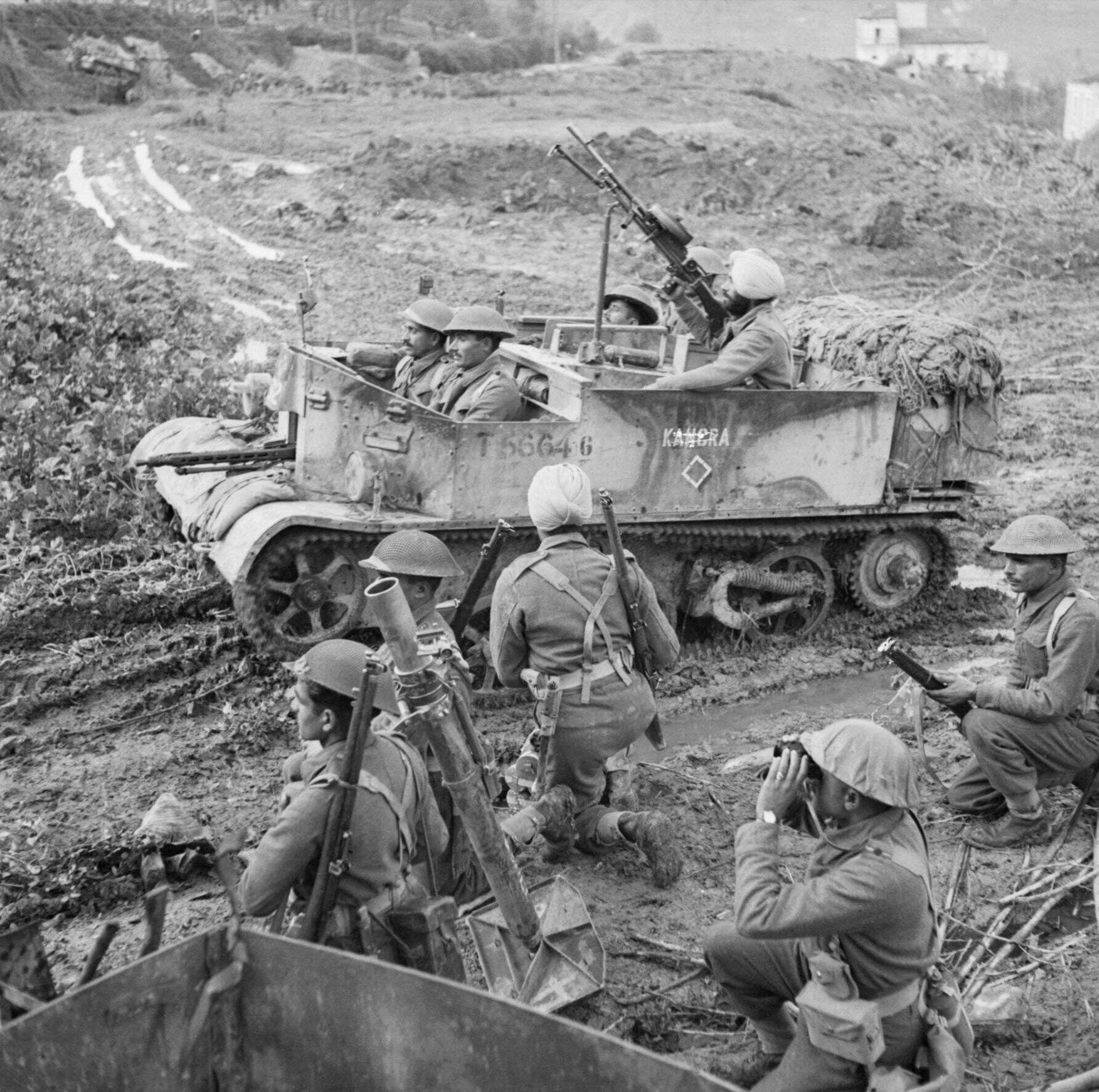
Indian Universal Carrier and mortar team between Lanciano and Orsogna

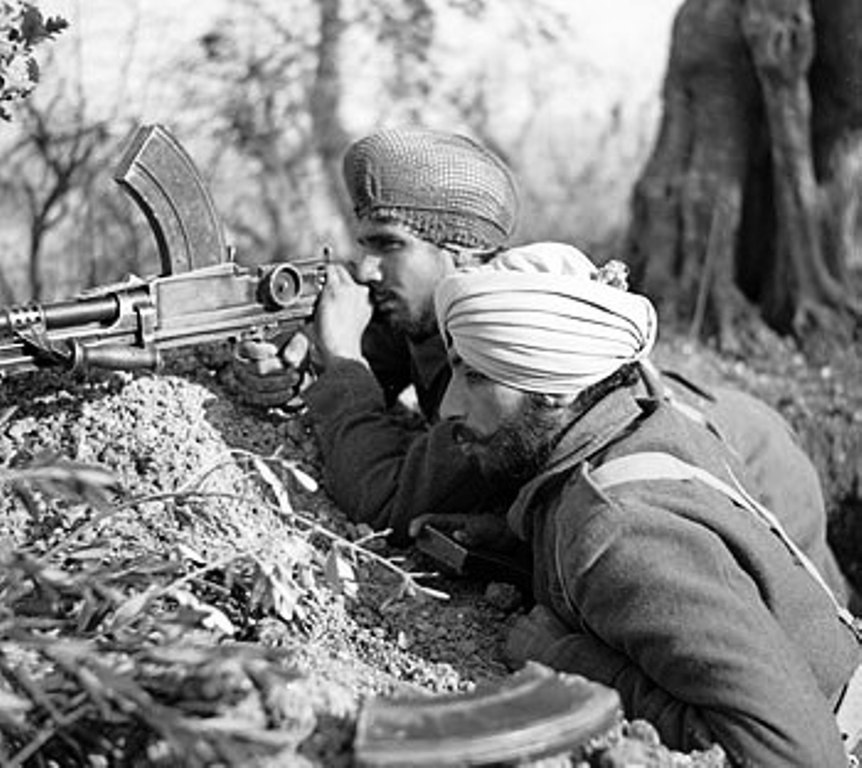
Indian soldiers with Bren Gun near Villa Grande

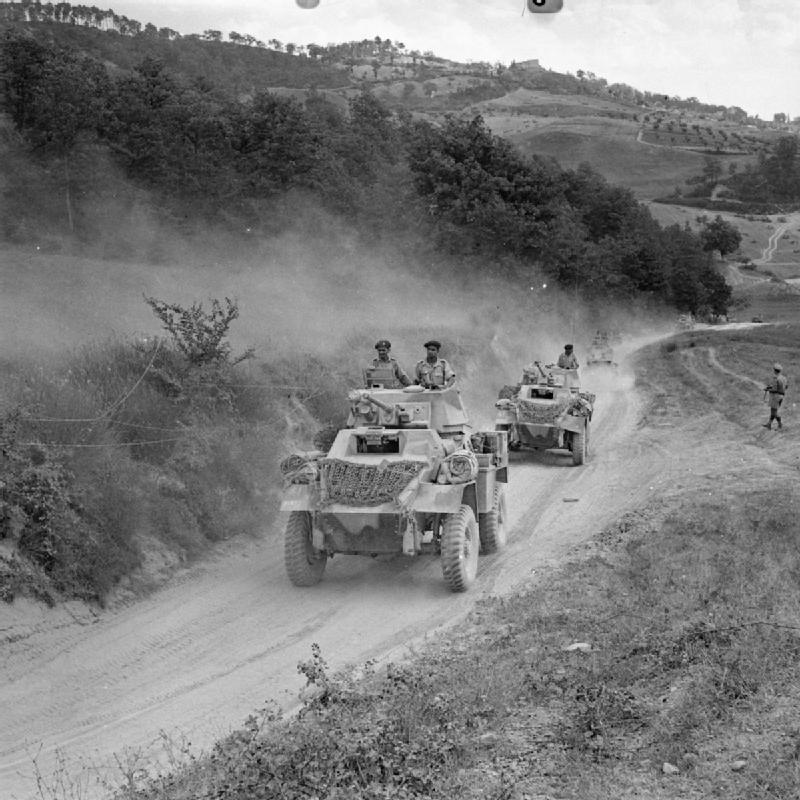
10th Division on the move in Italy

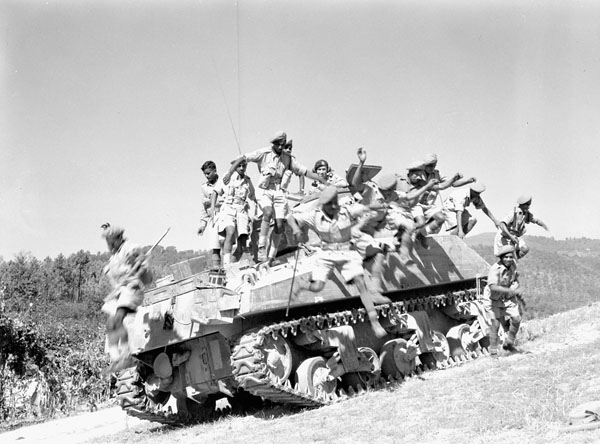
5th Mahratta Light Infantry train in Florence

=== Greece ===
On 24 October 1944, the 4th Indian Infantry Division were shipped to Greece, to help stabilise the country after the German withdrawal. The plan called for the division to be dispersed in three widely scattered areas. The 7th Indian Brigade and Divisional troops were allocated Greek Macedonia, Thrace and Thessaly, with instructions to keep watch on the borders of Yugoslavia and Bulgaria. The 11th Indian Brigade would garrison the towns of Western Greece and the Ionian islands. The 5th Indian Brigade would take over the Aegean area and the Cyclades, and would move into Crete when the enemy garrisons in that island capitulated.

On 3 December, the ELAS members of the Greek Government resigned. A general strike was declared, and police opened fire on demonstrators. In Italy, the 4th and 46th British Infantry Divisions were ordered to leave for Greece. On 15 January, a truce had been concluded in Athens, by the terms of which ELAS undertook to withdraw from the capital and Salonika and to occupy rural concentration areas. Except for isolated incidents, this truce ended operations in Greece.

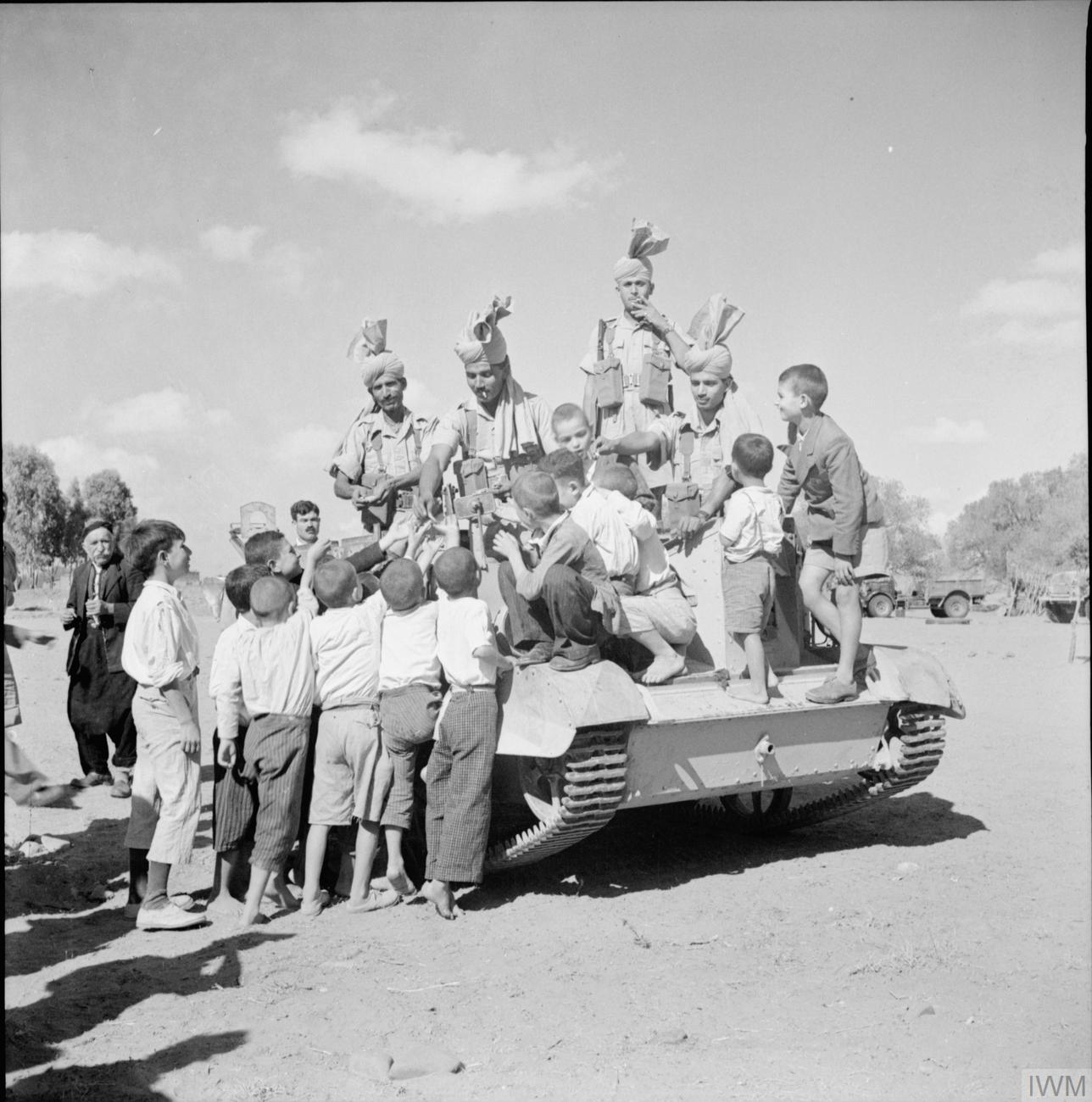
Indian Universal Carrier crew play with children in Cyprus

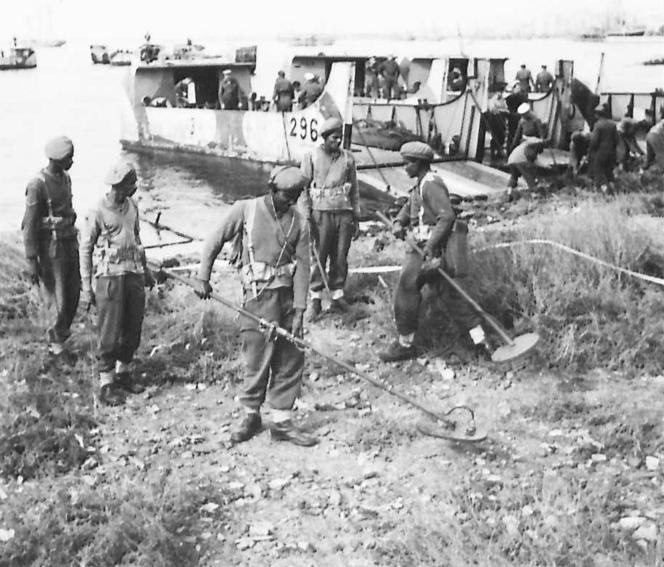
Indian soldiers sweep for mines after landing in Salonika

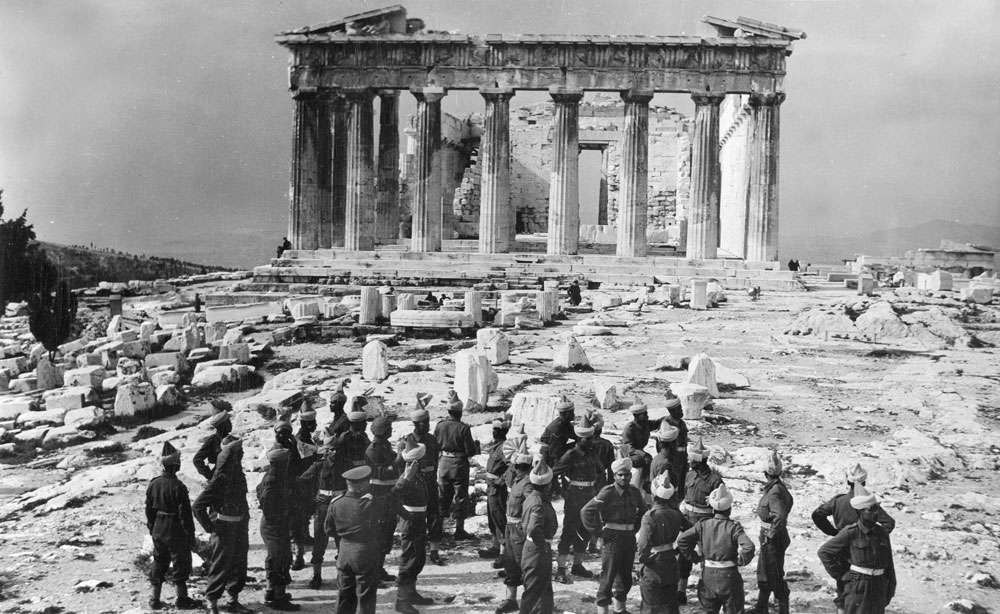
5th Indian Infantry Brigade tour Acropolis after clearing Piraeus of Communist forces

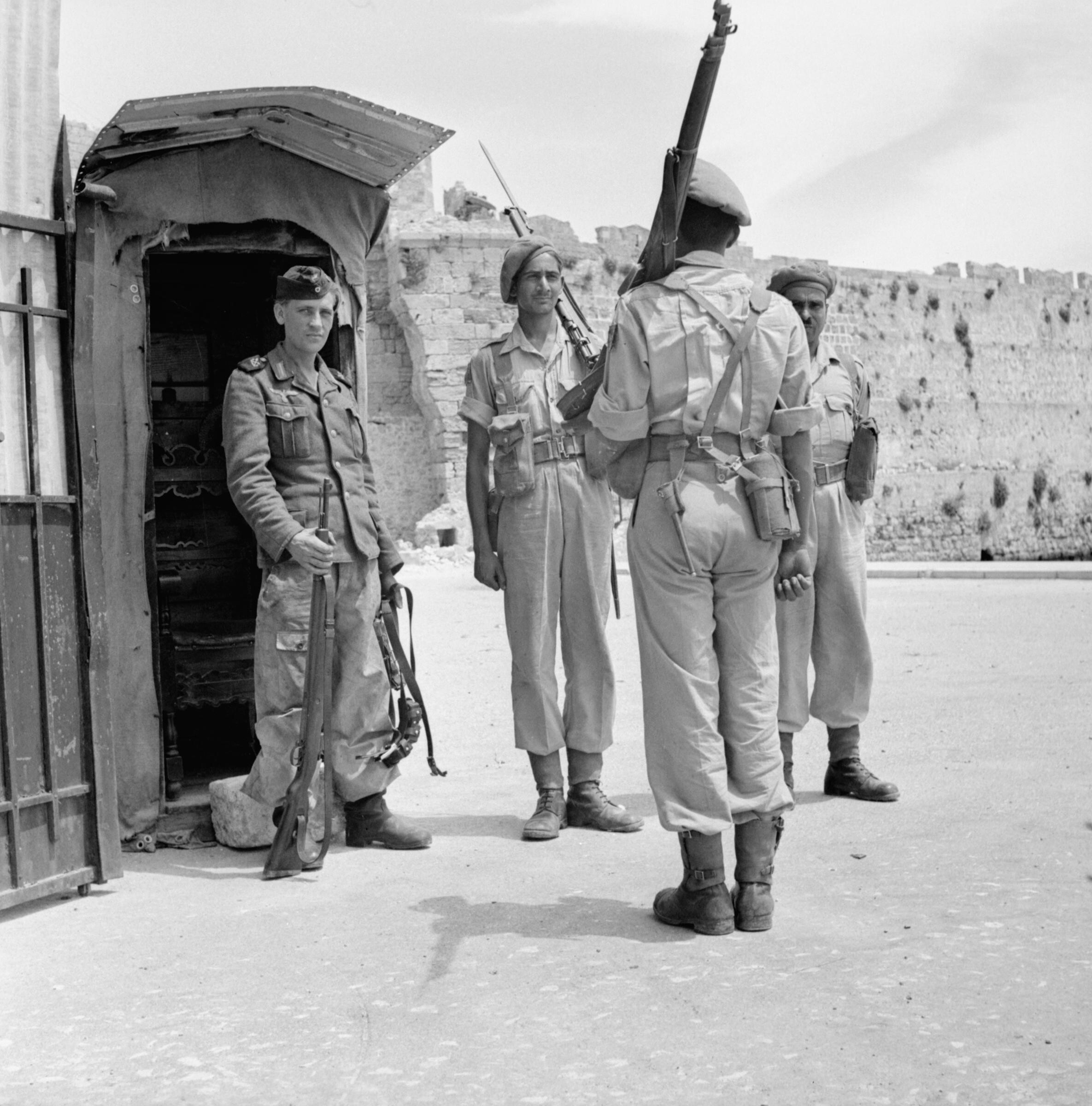
Bhopal Regiment take over German sentry position after liberation of Rhodes

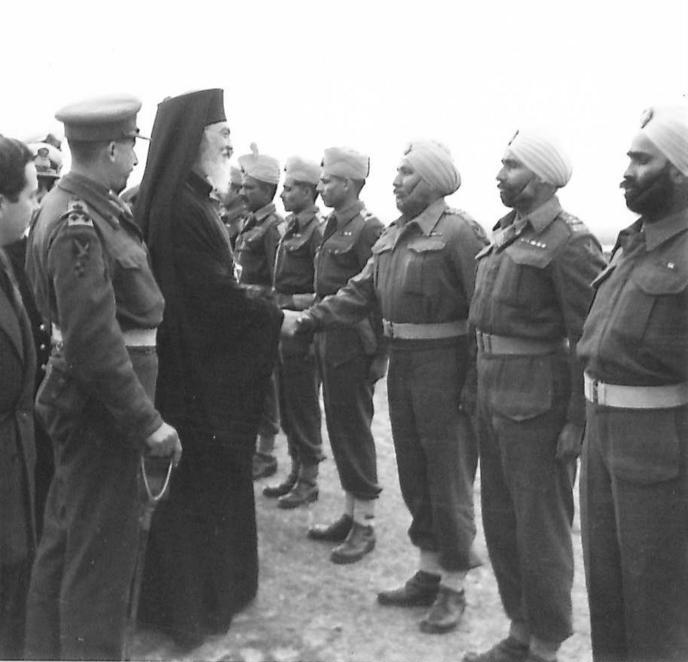
Archbishop Damaskinos inspects 4th Division

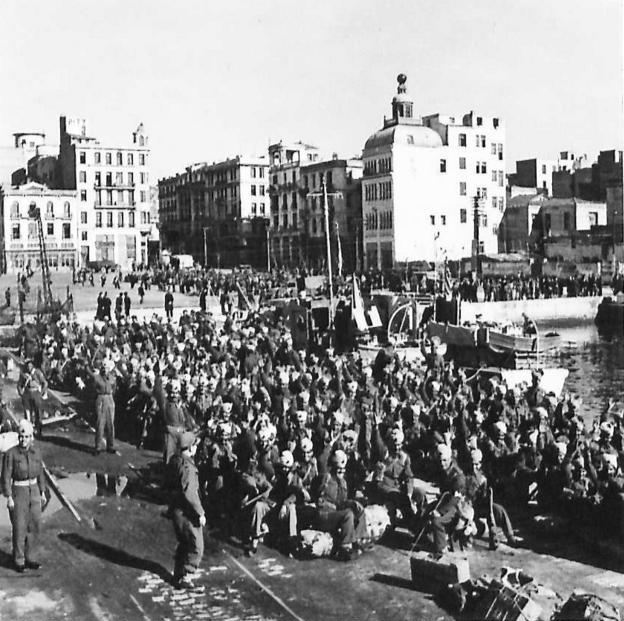
Red Eagles prepare to return home at war end

== India ==
The 14th Indian Infantry Division and the 39th Indian Infantry Division were converted to training formations in 1943, and remained in India till the end of the war. Other units that only served in India include the 32nd Indian Armoured Division and the 43rd Indian Armoured Division which never completed forming before being converted to the 44th Indian Airborne Division in 1943. The Assam-based 21st Indian Infantry Division was also broken up to form 44th Airborne in 1944. The 34th Indian Infantry Division provided the garrison for Ceylon, and remained there during the war, it was disbanded in 1945, never having seen active service.

== Victoria Cross ==
Indian personnel received 4,000 awards for gallantry, and 31 Victoria Crosses. The Victoria Cross (VC) is the highest military decoration, which is, or has been, awarded for valour "in the face of the enemy" to members of the armed forces of the Commonwealth countries, and previous British Empire territories. The Victoria Cross is awarded for

... most conspicuous bravery, or some daring or pre-eminent act of valour or self-sacrifice, or extreme devotion to duty in the presence of the enemy.

The following members of the Indian Army were recipients of the Victoria Cross in World War II;

=== East African campaign awards ===
- Second-Lieutenant Premindra Singh Bhagat, Corps of Indian Engineers

During the pursuit of the enemy following the capture of Metemma on the night 31 January – 1 February 1941, for his persistence (over a period of 96 hours working from dawn to dusk) and gallantry, in personally supervising the clearing of 15 minefields.

- Subadar Richhpal Ram, 6th Rajputana Rifles (posthumous award)

On 7 February 1941, at Keren, Eritrea, Richhpal Ram led a successful attack on the enemy and subsequently repelled six counter-attacks and then, without a shot left, brought the few survivors of his company back. Five days later, when leading another attack, his right foot was blown off, but he continued to encourage his men until he died.

=== Malayan campaign awards ===
- Lieutenant Colonel Arthur Edward Cumming, 12th Frontier Force Regiment

On 3 January 1942, near Kuantan, Malaya, the Japanese made a furious attack on the battalion and a strong enemy force penetrated the position. Cumming, with a small party of men, immediately led a counter-attack and although all his men became casualties and he, himself, had two bayonet wounds in the stomach he managed to restore the situation sufficiently for the major portion of the battalion and its vehicles to be withdrawn. Later, he drove in a carrier, under very heavy fire, collecting isolated detachments of his men and was again wounded. His gallant actions helped the brigade to withdraw safely.

=== Tunisian campaign awards ===
- Company Havildar Major Chhelu Ram, 6th Rajputana Rifles (posthumous award)

On the night of 19–20 April 1943, at Djebel Garci, Tunisia, despite being wounded took command of the company, leading them in hand-to-hand fighting. Wounded again, he continued rallying his men until he died.

- Subadar Lalbahadur Thapa, 2nd Gurkha Rifles

On 5–6 April 1943, during the silent attack on Rass-es-Zouai, Tunisia, Lalbahadur Thapa, commanding two sections, made his first contact with the enemy at the foot of a pathway winding up a narrow cleft which was thickly studded with enemy posts. The garrison of the out-posts were all killed by the subadar and his men, by kukri or bayonet and the next machine-gun posts were dealt with similarly. This officer then continued to fight his way up the bullet-swept approaches to the crest where he and the riflemen with him killed four - the rest fled. This made advance by the whole division was made possible.

=== Burma campaign awards ===
- Captain Michael Allmand. 6th Gurkha Rifles (posthumous award)
  - On 11 June 1944, when his platoon come within 20 yards of the Pin Hmi Road Bridge, the enemy opened heavy and accurate fire, inflicting severe casualties and forcing the men to seek cover. Captain Allmand, however, with the utmost gallantry charged on by himself, hurling grenades into the enemy gun positions and killing three Japanese himself with his kukrie. Inspired by the splendid example of their platoon commander the surviving men followed him and captured their objective. Two days later Captain Allmand, owing to casualties among the officers, took over command of the Company and, dashing 30 yards ahead of it through long grass and marshy ground, swept by machine gun fire, personally killed a number of enemy machine gunners and successfully led his men onto the ridge of high ground that they had been ordered to seize. Once again, on 23 June, in the final attack on the Railway Bridge at Mogaung, Captain Allmand, although suffering from trench-foot, which made it difficult for him to walk, moved forward alone through deep mud and shell-holes and charged a Japanese machine gun nest single-handed, but he was mortally wounded and died shortly afterwards.
- Major Frank Blaker 9th Gurkha Rifles (posthumous award)
  - On 9 July 1944, Major Blaker was commanding a company which was held up during an important advance by close-range firing from medium and light machine-guns. The major went ahead of his men through very heavy fire and despite being severely wounded in the arm, located the machine-guns and charged the position alone. Even when mortally wounded, he continued to cheer on his men whilst lying on the ground. His fearless leadership inspired his men to storm and capture the objective.
- Naik Fazal Din, 10th Baluch Regiment (posthumous award)
  - On 2 March 1945, during an attack, Naik Fazal Din's section was held up by fire from the enemy bunkers, whereupon he personally attacked the nearest bunker and silenced it, then led his men against the other. Suddenly six Japanese, led by two officers wielding swords, rushed out and Naik Fazal Din was run through the chest by one of them. As the sword was withdrawn, the naik wrested it from the hands of its owner and killed him with it. Having killed another Japanese with the sword he waved it aloft, continuing to encourage his men before staggering back to make his report and collapsing.
- Havildar Gaje Ghale, 5th Gurkha Rifles
  - During the period 24–27 May 1943, Havildar Gaje Ghale was in charge of a platoon of young soldiers engaged in attacking a strong Japanese position. Wounded in the arm, chest and leg he nevertheless continued to lead assault after assault, encouraging his men by shouting the Gurkha's battle-cry. Spurred on by the irresistible will of their leader, the platoon stormed and captured the position which the havildar then held and consolidated under heavy fire, refusing to go to the Regimental Aid post until ordered to do so.
- Rifleman Bhanbhagta Gurung, 2nd Gurkha Rifles
  - On 5 March 1945, his company became pinned down by an enemy sniper and were suffering casualties. As this sniper was inflicting casualties on the section, Rifleman Bhanbhagta Gurung, being unable to fire from the lying position, stood up fully exposed to the heavy fire and calmly killed the enemy sniper with his rifle, thus saving his section from suffering further casualties. The section advanced again but came under heavy fire once again. Without waiting for orders, Gurung dashed out to attack the first enemy fox-hole. Throwing two grenades, he killed the two occupants and without any hesitation rushed on to the next enemy fox-hole and killed the Japanese in it with his bayonet. He cleared two further fox-holes with bayonet and grenade. "During his single-handed attacks on these four enemy fox-holes, Rifleman Bhanbhagta Gurung was subjected to almost continuous and point-blank Light Machine Gun fire from a bunker on the North tip of the objective." For the fifth time, Gurung "went forward alone in the face of heavy enemy fire to knock out this position. He doubled forward and leapt on to the roof of the bunker from where, his hand grenades being finished, he flung two No. 77 smoke grenades into the bunker slit." Gurung killed two Japanese soldiers who ran out of the bunker with his Kukri, and then advanced into the cramped bunker and killed the remaining Japanese soldier. Gurung ordered three others to take up positions in the bunker. "The enemy counter-attack followed soon after, but under Rifleman Bhanbhagta Gurung's command the small party inside the bunker repelled it with heavy loss to the-enemy. Rifleman Bhanbhagta Gurung showed outstanding bravery and a complete disregard for his own safety. His courageous clearing of five enemy positions single-handed was in itself decisive in capturing the objective and his inspiring example to the rest of the Company contributed to the speedy consolidation of this success".
- Rifleman Lachhiman Gurung, 8th Gurkha Rifles
  - On 12–13 May 1945, Rifleman Lachhiman Gurung was manning the most forward post of his platoon which bore the brunt of an attack by at least 200 of the enemy. Twice he hurled back grenades which had fallen on his trench, but the third exploded in his right hand, blowing off his fingers, shattering his arm and severely wounding him in the face, body and right leg. His two comrades were also badly wounded but the rifleman, now alone and disregarding his wounds, loaded and fired his rifle with his left hand for four hours, calmly waiting for each attack which he met with fire at point blank range. Afterwards, when the casualties were counted, it is reported that there were 31 dead Japanese around his position which he had killed, with only one arm.
- Jemadar Abdul Hafiz, 9th Jat Regiment (posthumous award)
  - On 6 April 1944, Jemadar Abdul Hafiz was ordered to attack with his platoon a prominent position held by the enemy, the only approach to which was across a bare slope and then up a very steep cliff. The Jemadar led the assault, killing several of the enemy himself and then pressed on regardless of machine-gun fire from another feature. He received two wounds, the second of which was fatal, but he had succeeded in routing an enemy vastly superior in numbers and had captured a most important position.
- Lieutenant Karamjeet Singh Judge, 15th Punjab Regiment (posthumous award)
  - On 18 March 1945, Lieutenant Karamjeet Singh Judge, a platoon commander of a company ordered to capture a cotton mill, dominated the battlefield by his numerous acts of gallantry. After eliminating ten enemy bunkers he directed one tank to within 20 yards of another and asked the tank commander to cease fire while he went in to mop up. While doing so he was mortally wounded.
- Rifleman Ganju Lama, 7th Gurkha Rifles
  - On 12 June 1944,'B' Company was attempting to stem the enemy's advance when it came under heavy machine-gun and tank machine-gun fire. Rifleman Ganju Lama, with complete disregard for his own safety, took his PIAT gun and, crawling forward, succeeded in bringing the gun into action within 30 yards of the enemy tanks, knocking out two of them. Despite a broken wrist and two other serious wounds to his right and left hands he then moved forward and engaged the tank crew who were trying to escape. Not until he had accounted for all of them did he consent to have his wounds dressed.
- Rifleman Tul Bahadur Pun, 6th Gurkha Rifles
  - On 23 June 1944, during an attack on the railway bridge, a section of one of the platoons was wiped out with the exception of Rifleman Tul Bahadur Pun, his section commander and one other. The section commander immediately led a charge on the enemy position but was at once badly wounded, as was the third man. Rifleman Pun, with a Bren gun continued the charge alone in the face of shattering fire and reaching the position, killed three of the occupants and put five more to flight, capturing two light machine-guns and much ammunition. He then gave accurate supporting fire, enabling the rest of his platoon to reach their objective.
- Rifleman Agansing Rai, 5th Gurkha Rifles
  - on 26 June 1944, under withering fire Agansing Rai and his party charged a machine-gun. Agansing Rai himself killed three of the crew. When the first position had been taken, he then led a dash on a machine-gun firing from the jungle, where he killed three of the crew, his men accounting for the rest. He subsequently tackled an isolated bunker single-handed, killing all four occupants. The enemy were now so demoralised that they fled and the second post was recaptured.
- Sepoy Bhandari Ram, 10th Baluch Regiment
  - On 22 November 1944, Sepoy Bhandari Ram's platoon was pinned down by machine-gun fire. Although wounded he crawled up to a Japanese light machine-gun in full view of the enemy and was wounded again, but continued crawling to within 5 yards of his objective. He then threw a grenade into the position, killing the gunner and two others. This action inspired his platoon to rush and capture the enemy position. Only then did he allow his wounds to be dressed.
- Lance Naik Sher Shah, 16th Punjab Regiment (posthumous award)
  - On 19–20 January 1945, Lance Naik Sher Shah was commanding a left forward section of his platoon when it was attacked by overwhelming numbers of Japanese. He broke up two attacks by crawling right in among the enemy and shooting at point-blank range. On the second occasion he was hit and his leg shattered, but he maintained that his injury was only slight and when the third attack came, he again crawled forward engaging the enemy until he was shot through the head and killed.
- Naik Gian Singh, 15th Punjab Regiment
  - On 2 March 1945, Naik Gian Singh who was in charge of the leading section of his platoon, went on alone firing his tommy gun, and rushed the enemy foxholes. In spite of being wounded in the arm, he went on, hurling grenades. He attacked and killed the crew of a cleverly concealed anti-tank gun, and then led his men down a lane clearing all enemy positions. He went on leading his section until the action had been satisfactorily completed.
- Naik Nand Singh, 11th Sikh Regiment
  - On 11–12 March 1944, Naik Nand Singh, commanding a leading section of the attack, was ordered to recapture a position gained by the enemy. He led his section up a very steep knife-edged ridge under very heavy machine-gun and rifle fire and although wounded in the thigh, captured the first trench. He then crawled forward alone and, wounded again in the face and shoulder, nevertheless captured the second and third trenches.
- Havildar Parkash Singh, 8th Punjab Regiment
  - On 6 January 1943, Havildar Parkash Singh drove his own carrier forward and rescued the crews of two disabled carriers under very heavy fire. Again on 19 January in the same area he rescued two more carriers which had been put out of action by an enemy anti-tank gun. He then went out yet again and brought to safety another disabled carrier containing two wounded men.
- Jemadar Prakash Singh Chib, 13th Frontier Force Rifles (posthumous award)
  - On 16/17 February 1945, Jemadar Prakash Singh was commanding a platoon which took the main weight of fierce enemy attacks. He was wounded in both ankles and relieved of his command, but when his second-in-command was also wounded, he crawled back and took command of his unit again, directing operations and encouraging his men. He was wounded in both legs a second time but he continued to direct the defence, dragging himself from place to place by his hands. When wounded a third time and final time, he lay shouting the Dogra war-cry as he died, inspiring his company that finally drove off the enemy.
- Havildar Umrao Singh, Indian Artillery Regiment
  - On 15–16 December 1944, Havildar Umrao Singh was a field gun detachment commander in an advanced section of the 30th Mountain Regiment, Indian Artillery, attached to the 81st West African Division. Singh's gun was in an advanced position, supporting the 8th Gold Coast Regiment. After a 90-minute sustained bombardment from 75 mm guns and mortars, Singh's gun position was attacked by at least two companies of Japanese infantry. Using a Bren light machine gun he directed the rifle fire of the gunners, holding off the assault, and was wounded by two grenades. A second wave of attackers killed all but Singh and two other gunners, but was also beaten off. The three soldiers had only a few bullets remaining, and these were rapidly exhausted in the initial stages of the assault by a third wave of attackers. Undaunted, Singh picked up a "gun bearer" (a heavy iron rod, similar to a crow bar) and used that as a weapon in hand-to-hand fighting. He was seen to strike down three infantrymen, before succumbing to a rain of blows. Six hours later, after a counterattack, he was found alive but unconscious near to his artillery piece, almost unrecognisable from a head injury, still clutching his gun bearer. Ten Japanese soldiers lay dead nearby. His field gun was back in action later that day.
- Subadar Ram Sarup Singh, 1st Punjab Regiment (posthumous award)
  - On 25 October 1944, two platoons were ordered to attack a particularly strong enemy position. The platoon commanded by Subadar Ram Sarup Singh attained its objective, completely routing the enemy, and although the subadar was wounded in both legs he insisted on carrying on. Later, the enemy's fierce counter-attack was only halted by Subadar Ram Sarup Singh's dashing counter-charge in which he killed four of the enemy himself. He was again wounded, in the thigh, but continued to lead his men, killing two more of the enemy, until he was mortally wounded.
- Acting Subedar Netrabahadur Thapa, 5th Gurkha Rifles (posthumous award)
  - On 25–26 June 1944, Acting Subedar Thapa was in command of a small isolated hill post at Bishenpur, Burma when the Japanese army attacked in force. The men, inspired by their leader's example, held their ground and the enemy were beaten off, but casualties were very heavy and reinforcements were requested. When these arrived some hours later they also suffered heavy casualties. Thapa retrieved the reinforcements' ammunition himself and mounted an offensive with grenades and kukris, until he was killed.

=== Italian campaign awards ===
- Naik Yeshwant Ghadge, 5th Mahratta Light Infantry (posthumous award)
  - On 10 July 1944, a rifle section commanded by Naik Yeshwant Ghadge came under heavy machine-gun fire at close range which killed or wounded all members of the section except the commander. Without hesitation Naik Yeshwant Ghadge rushed the machine-gun position, first throwing a grenade which knocked out the machine-gun and firer and then he shot one of the gun crew. Finally, having no time to change his magazine, he clubbed to death the two remaining members of the crew. He fell mortally wounded, shot by an enemy sniper.
- Rifleman Thaman Gurung, 5th Gurkha Rifles (posthumous award)
  - On 10 November 1944, Rifleman Thaman Gurung was acting as a scout to a fighting patrol. It was undoubtedly due to his superb gallantry that his platoon was able to withdraw from an extremely difficult position without many more casualties than were in fact incurred and that some very valuable information was obtained which resulted in the capture of the feature three days later. The rifleman's bravery cost him his life.
- Sepoy Ali Haidar, 13th Frontier Force Rifles
  - On 9 April 1945, during the crossing of the Senio River, only Sepoy Ali Haidar and the two other men of his section managed to get across under heavy machine-gun fire. Then, while the other two covered him, the sepoy attacked the nearest strong point and, in spite of being wounded, put it out of action. In attacking a second strong-point he was again severely wounded but managed to crawl closer, throw a grenade and charge the post; two of the enemy were wounded, the remaining two surrendered. The rest of the company were then able to cross the river and establish a bridgehead.
- Sepoy Namdeo Jadav, 5th Mahratta Light Infantry
  - On 9 April 1945, Italy, when a small party were almost wiped out in an assault on the east floodbank of the river, Sepoy Namdeo Jadav carried two wounded men under heavy fire through deep water, up a steep bank and through a mine belt to safety. Then, determined to avenge his dead comrades, he eliminated three enemy machine-gun posts. Finally, climbing on top of the bank he shouted the Maratha war cry and waved the remaining companies across. He not only saved many lives but enabled the battalion to secure the bridgehead and ultimately to crush all enemy resistance in the area.
- Sepoy Kamal Ram, 8th Punjab Regiment
  - On 12 May 1944, the company advance was held up by heavy machine-gun fire from four posts on the front and flanks. The capture of the position was essential and Sepoy Kamal Ram volunteered to get round the rear of the right post and silence it. He attacked the first two posts single-handed, killing or taking prisoner the occupants and together with a Havildar he then went on to complete the destruction of a third. His outstanding bravery unquestionably saved a difficult situation at a critical period of the battle.
- Rifleman Sher Bahadur Thapa, 9th Gurkha Rifles (posthumous award)
  - On 18–19 September 1944, when a company of the 9th Gurkha Rifles encountered bitter opposition from a German prepared position, Rifleman Sher Bahadur Thapa and his section commander, who was afterwards badly wounded, charged and silenced an enemy machine-gun. The rifleman then went on alone to the exposed part of a ridge where, ignoring a hail of bullets, he silenced more machine-guns, covered a withdrawal and rescued two wounded men before he was killed.

== George Cross ==
The George Cross (GC) is the counterpart of the Victoria Cross and the highest gallantry award for civilians as well as for military personnel in actions which are not in the face of the enemy, or for which purely military honours would not normally be granted. The following members of the Indian Army were recipients of the George Cross in World War II;

- Captain Mateen Ahmed Ansari, 7th Rajput Regiment (posthumous award)
  - He was taken prisoner by the Japanese after they invaded Hong Kong in December 1941. After the Japanese discovered that he was related to the ruler of one of the Princely States, they demanded that he renounce his allegiance to the British and foment discontent in the ranks of Indian prisoners in the prison camps. He refused and was thrown into the notorious Stanley Jail in May 1942, where he was starved and brutalised. When he remained firm in his allegiance to the British on his return to the prison camps, he was again incarcerated in Stanley Jail, where he was starved and tortured for five months. He was then returned to the original camp, where he continued his allegiance to the British, and even helped to organise escape attempts by other prisoners. He was sentenced to death, with over 30 other British, Chinese and Indian prisoners and beheaded on 20 October 1943.
- Sowar Ditto Ram, Central India Horse (posthumous award)
  - Sowar Ditto Ram was posthumously awarded the George Cross for his gallantry in helping a wounded comrade on 23 July 1944 at Monte Cassino in Italy.
- Lieutenant Colonel Mahmood Khan Durrani, 1st Bahawalpur Infantry, Indian State Forces
  - At the time of his capture, he was attached to the 1st Bahawalpur Infantry of the Indian State Forces. During the retreat in Malaya in 1942, he and small party of soldiers managed to evade capture for three months before their location was betrayed to the Japanese sponsored Indian Nationalist Army. He refused to co-operate with the INA and worked to counter their attempts to infiltrate agents into India. In May 1944, he was arrested and systematically starved and tortured by the Japanese, but refused to betray his comrades. He was then handed over by the Japanese to the INA where he was again brutally tortured and, at one point, sentenced to death. He stood firm throughout his ordeal.
- Lance Naik Islam-ud-Din, 9th Jat Regiment (posthumous award)
  - 12 April 1945 in Pyawbwe, Central Burma when he sacrificed his own life to save others.
- Naik Kirpa Ram 13th Frontier Force Rifles (posthumous award)
  - During a field firing exercise at a rest camp in Bangalore, a rifle grenade misfired and fell only eight yards from his section. The twenty-eight-year-old soldier rushed forward, shouting at the men to take cover and attempted to throw it to a safe distance. It exploded in his hand, wounding him fatally, but his self-sacrifice saved his comrades from harm.
- Havildar Abdul Rahman, 9th Jat Regiment (posthumous award)
  - He was awarded the decoration for the gallantry he showed in attempting an air crash rescue on 22 February 1945 in Kletek in Java.
- Lieutenant Subramanian, Queen Victoria's Own Madras Sappers and Miners (posthumous award)
  - Sacrificed his own life on 24 June 1944 by throwing himself over a mine to protect others from the blast.

== Aftermath ==
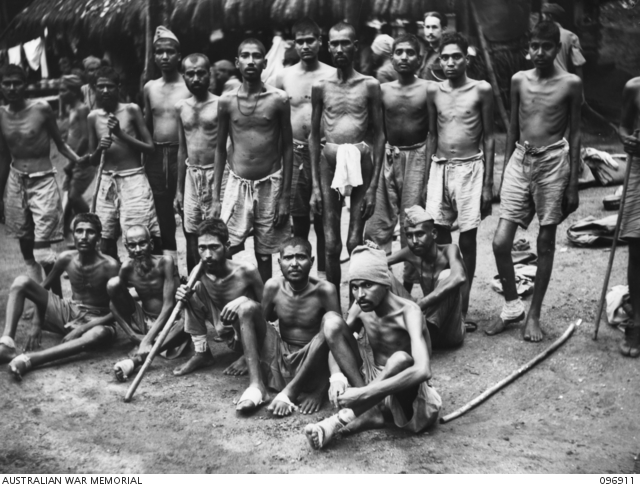
Indian POWs liberated from Japanese camp in New Britain, PNG

World War II cost the lives of over 87,000 soldiers, air crews and mariners from the Indian Empire, This included 24,338 killed and 11,754 missing in action. the overwhelming majority being members of the Indian Army. Another 34,354 more were wounded,

Of the 79,489 Indian personnel who became prisoners of war (POWs), German and/or Italian forces held 15,000–17,000. Between 2,500 and 4,000 of these POWs subsequently enlisted in the Italian Battaglione Azad Hindoustan and/or German Indische Legion, with the intention of fighting the Allies. More than 40,000 Indian POWs captured by Japanese forces volunteered for the pro-Japanese Indian National Army (INA), which fought the Allies in Burma and north-east India. Out of 60,000 Indian POWs taken at the Fall of Singapore, 11,000 died in Japanese camps from disease, malnutrition, physical abuse, or overwork; many of these had been transported to New Guinea or the Solomon Islands, where they were used as forced labour by Japanese forces.

In late 1943, when Italy capitulated to the Allies, Indians were among tens of thousands of Allied POWs who escaped from, or were liberated from POW camps. During 1943 and 1944, 128 Indian POWs were repatriated from Germany in prisoner exchanges. More than 200 Indian POWs died in captivity in Europe. By 30 April 1945, only 8,950 Indian prisoners of war remained in German camps. The German Indische Legion saw little front-line action, suffered few casualties and many of its recruits were returned to POW camps. In July 1945, the British government reported that at least 1,045 members of the Legion had already been repatriated to India, or were being held for questioning in the UK, while about 700 remained at large in Europe.) Conversely, 2,615 of the POWs recruited by the INA were killed in action against the Allies or missing.

World War II was the last time the Indian Army fought as part of the British military apparatus, as independence and partition followed in 1947. On 3 June 1947, the British Government announced the plan for the partition of the sub–continent between India and Pakistan. On 30 June 1947, the procedure for the division of the armed forces was agreed upon. After partition, the Indian Army was divided between the armies of the newly independent states, the Indian Army and the Pakistan Army. Field Marshal Claude Auchinleck, then Commander-in-Chief, India, was appointed Supreme Commander to ensure smooth division of units, stores and so on. It was announced on 1 July 1947, that both countries would have operational control of their respective armed forces by 15 August 1947.

== See also ==
- Indian Army during World War I
- List of Indian divisions in World War II
- List of British Empire divisions in the Second World War
- Military history of the British Commonwealth in the Second World War
- Indian National Army
- Indian Legion
