= Thomas Bunbury (British Army officer, born 1791) =

Commandant of Norfolk Island and officer in the British Army (1791–1861)

Thomas Bunbury CB KTS
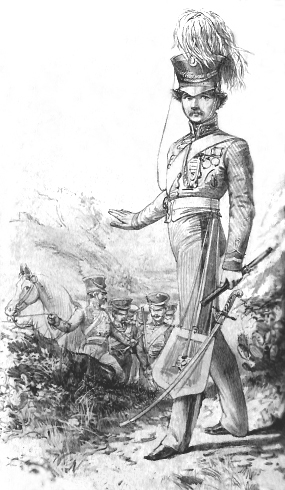
- Thomas Bunbury leading his troops. Self-portrait
- Born: 19 May 1791; Gibraltar
- Died: 25 December 1861 (aged 70); 11 St James's Terrace, Regent's Park, London
- Spouse: Clara Matilda Harriott (m. 1853)
- Military career
- Allegiance: United Kingdom
- Branch: (United Kingdom of Great Britain and Ireland) British Army
- Service years: 1807–1849
- Rank: Lieutenant Colonel
- Units: 90th Regiment (Perthshire Volunteers), 1807– 3rd Regiment, 1807– 91st (Argyllshire Highlanders) Regiment, 1809– 80th Regiment (Staffordshire Volunteers), 1822–1849
- Commands: Commandant, Norfolk Island; New Zealand, 1840–1844
- Campaigns: Peninsular War; Second Battle of Porto; Battle of Talavera; Battle of Barrosa; Battle of Nivelle; Battle of the Nive; Battle of Bayonne; Battle of Toulouse; New Zealand Wars; Tauranga Campaign (1842); First Anglo-Sikh War; Battle of Mudki; Battle of Ferozeshah; Battle of Sobraon
- Awards: Companion of the Order of the Bath; Knight of the Military Order of the Tower and Sword; Cruz da Guerra Peninsular (Ouro); Military General Service Medal with clasps Sutlej Medal with Sobraon and Ferozeshah clasps
- Memorials: 80th Regiment of Foot (Staffordshire Volunteers), Lichfield Cathedral. Bunbury's medals encased

Lieutenant Colonel Thomas Bunbury CB KTS (19 May 1791 – 25 December 1861) was an officer in the British Army during the early Victorian period. He was commandant of the convict settlement at Norfolk Island for a period in 1839. He later served in New Zealand and British India.

== Biography ==
Born on 19 May 1791 in Gibraltar, the son of Benjamin Bunbury, an officer of the 32nd Regiment, Bunbury was later placed in a school at the village of Catterick, North Yorkshire upon his father's marriage to Ann Cowling, daughter of Henry Cowling of Richmond, North Yorkshire, in 1797. He was later educated at Staindrop, County Durham, until his father moved to Hyde End and Cope Hall, near Newbury, Berkshire, then to tuition under the Rev. J Meredith at Walsh Common. Later he was sent on to Bicheno's Newbury seminary, where in 1807 he learned that an ensigncy in the 90th Regiment of Foot (Perthshire Volunteers) had been conferred upon him from 12 March that year. Following an incident at a family dinner with his uncle, Lieutenant Colonel Hamilton Welch Bunbury, 3rd Regiment of Foot, he was transferred to the 3rd Regiment on 19 or 22 August 1807, and joined the 2nd Battalion under Colonel Bingham at Cirencester.

Having arrived at Fort St. Julien, Lisbon, on HMS Plover in November 1808, Bunbury fought in the Peninsular War. He carried his regiment's colours at the Battle of Talavera, 27–28 July 1809. From 17 August 1809, he served with the 91st Regiment of Foot with the rank of lieutenant. Wounded during the war, he considered becoming an artist after it ended, and spent time in Paris. In 1822, he joined the 80th Regiment of Foot, based in Malta and served there from 1823 to 1827. In 1825, he transferred to the 85th Regiment of Foot for a period of service in Spain before returning to the 80th Regiment, with which he later served in England.

In 1837, Bunbury was sent to Australia and in due course the Governor of New South Wales, George Gipps, ordered him take command of the garrison and convict settlement at Norfolk Island. He was commandant at Norfolk Island from April to July 1839. As commandant, he was confident in his ability to manage the hardened convicts under his command. He wrote that he could not understand why "a villain who has been guilty of every enormity, should feel shame at having his back scratched with the cat-o-nine-tails when he felt none for his atrocious crimes." He also claimed that "if a man is too sick to work he is too sick to eat" and claimed that the queue at the hospital was halved. Although his punishments were harsh, he replaced hand hoeing with ploughs, rewarded good behaviour with improved jobs and gave older convicts lighter work. He earned the ire of the soldiers on the island by ordering the destruction of huts built on the small gardens they kept for their own use and for trafficking with the convicts. The soldiers mutinied, a warship was sent to restore peace and Bunbury was recalled in July 1839.

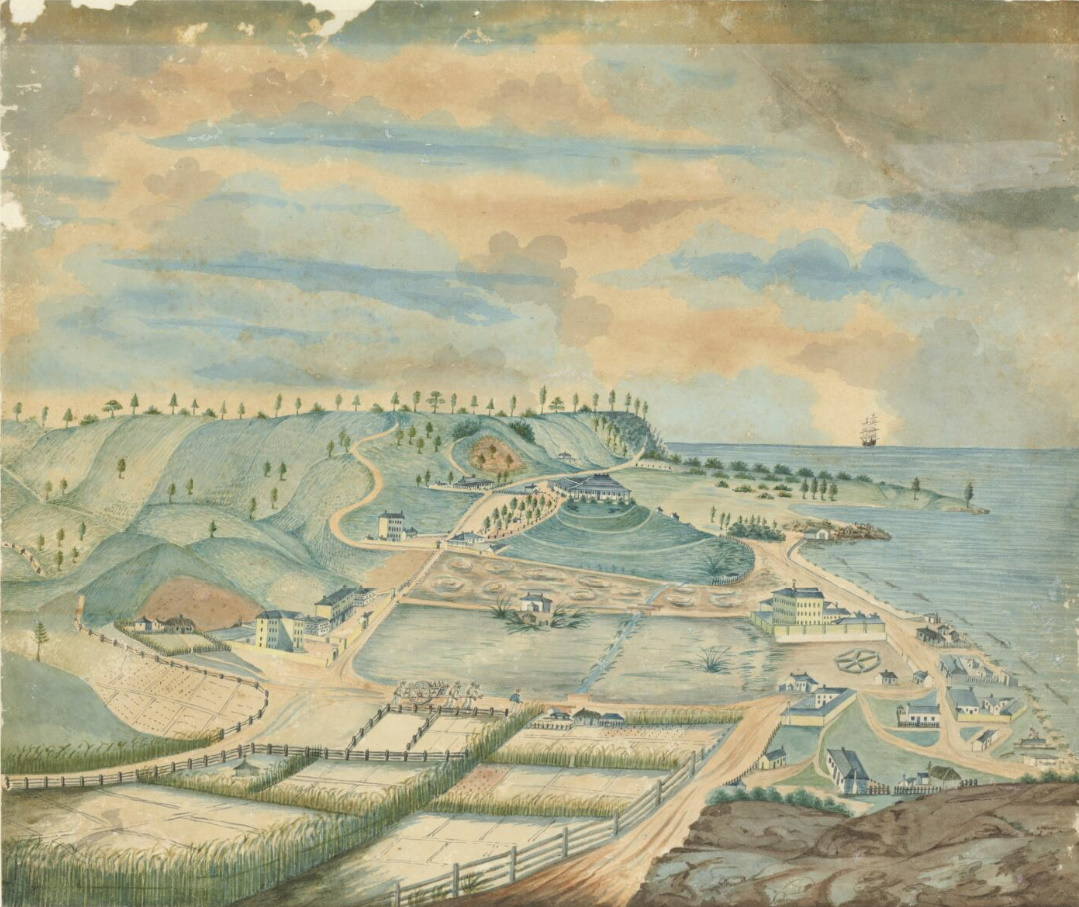
Kingston, Norfolk Island, c. 1839. Artist: Thomas Seller. National Library of Australia

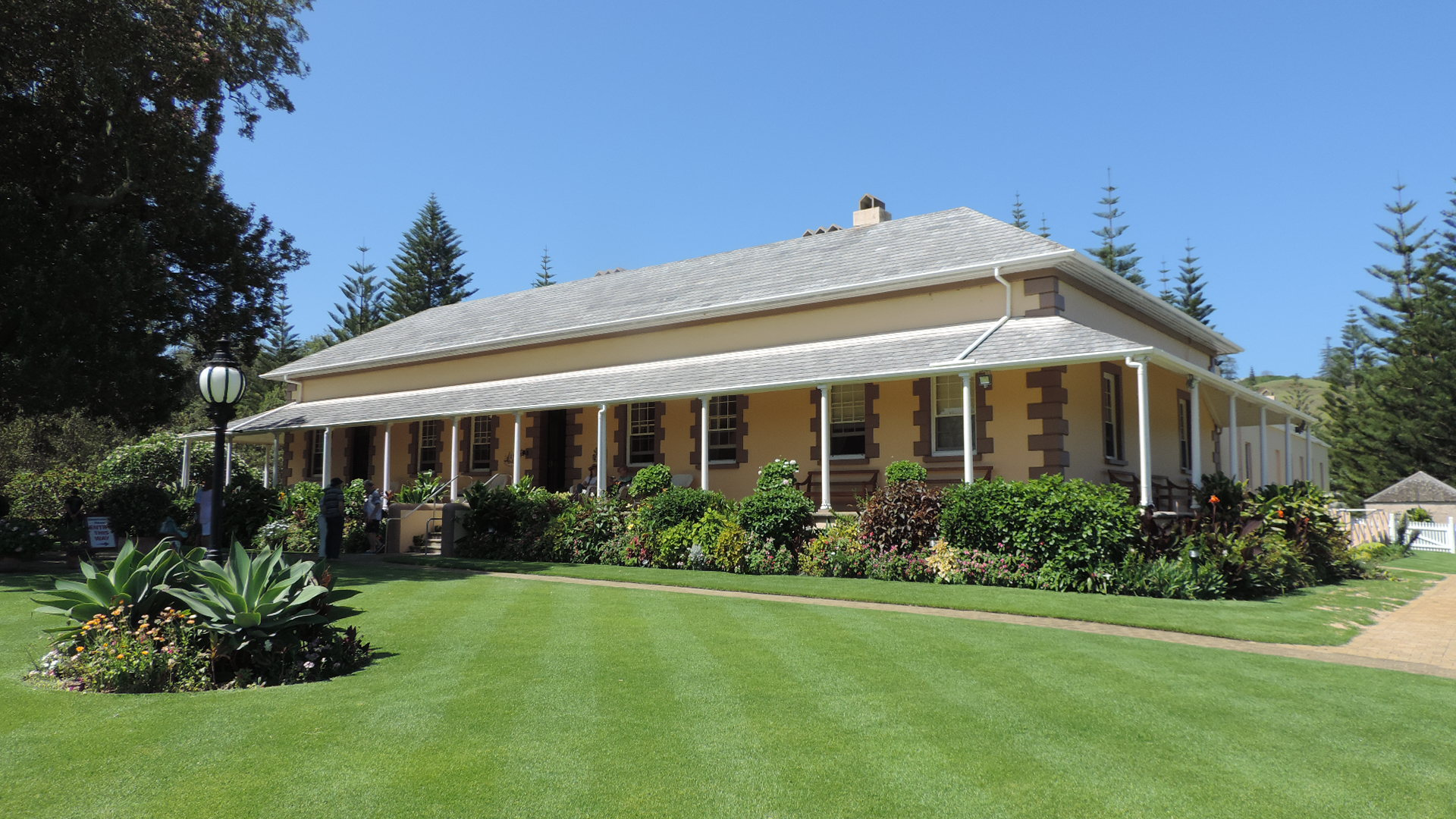
Government House, Kingston, Norfolk Island, 2015

In 1840, after William Hobson, Lieutenant-Governor of New Zealand, suffered a stroke, Bunbury was sent by Gipps to New Zealand with instructions to take over as Lieutenant-Governor if Hobson was incapacitated, but he had recovered. Bunbury took the Treaty of Waitangi to the South Island on HMS Herald and took possession of the island. He was made a magistrate in 1841 and acted as Deputy Governor in January 1844. The Surveyor General, Felton Mathew, when surveying and planning Auckland in 1841, named the tip of a peninsula to the west of the town after him, Point Bunbury, later renamed Point Chevalier.

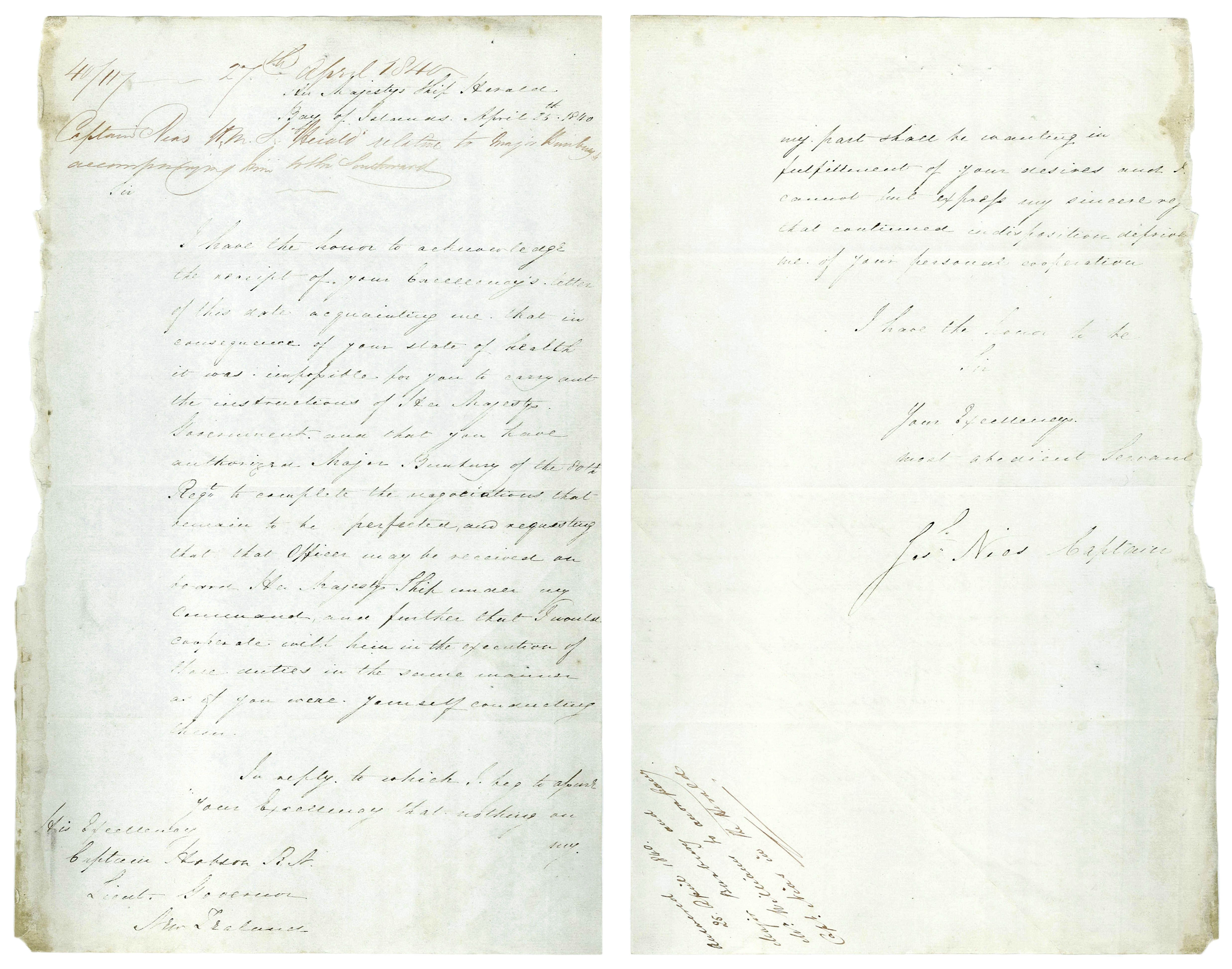
Letter from Captain Joseph Nias, RN, HMS Herald, to Captain William Hobson, RN, Lieutenant-Governor of New Zealand, acknowledging Bunbury's task and that he will assist. 25 April 1840. Archives New Zealand

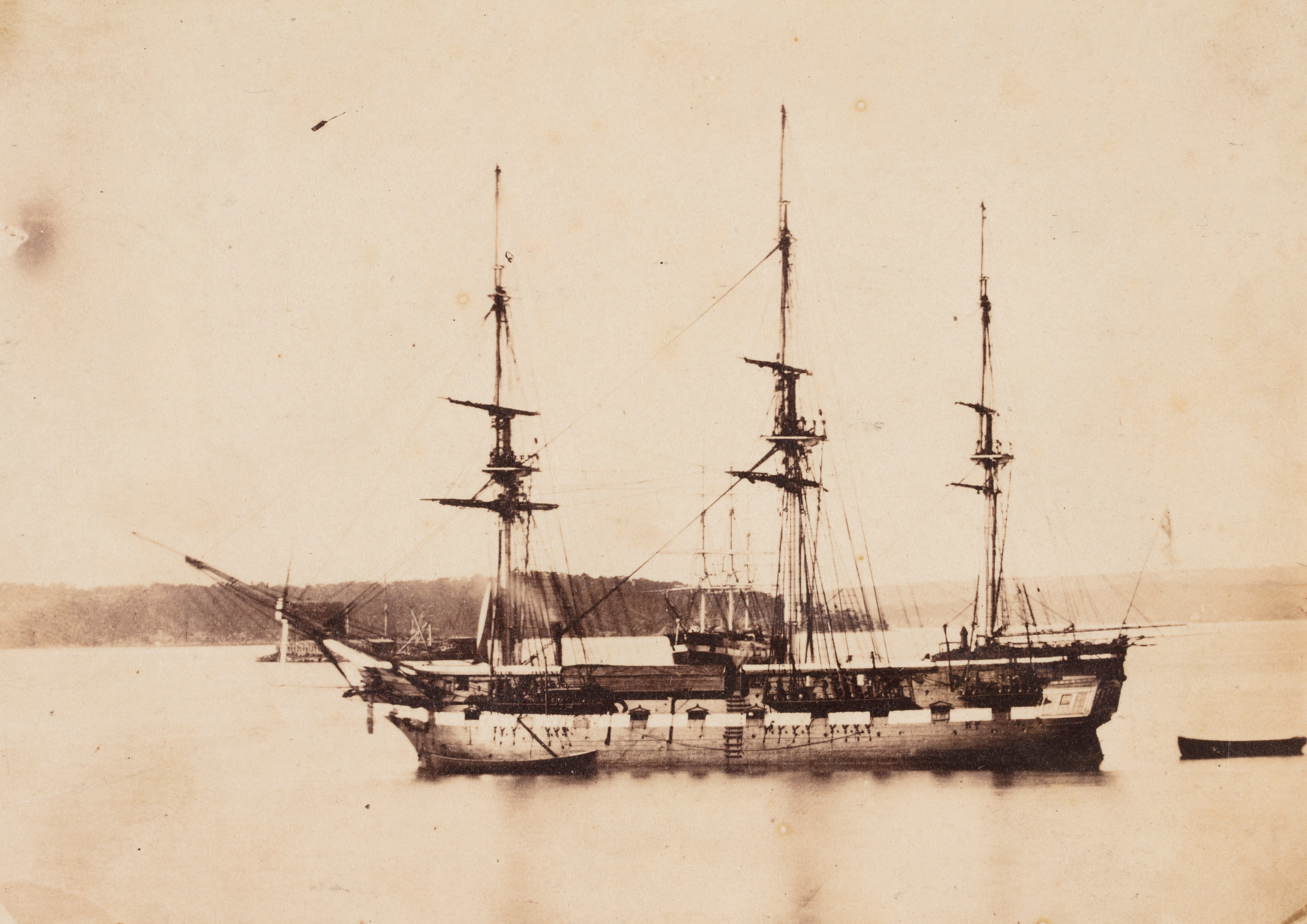
HMS Herald, 1857.
State Library of New South Wales

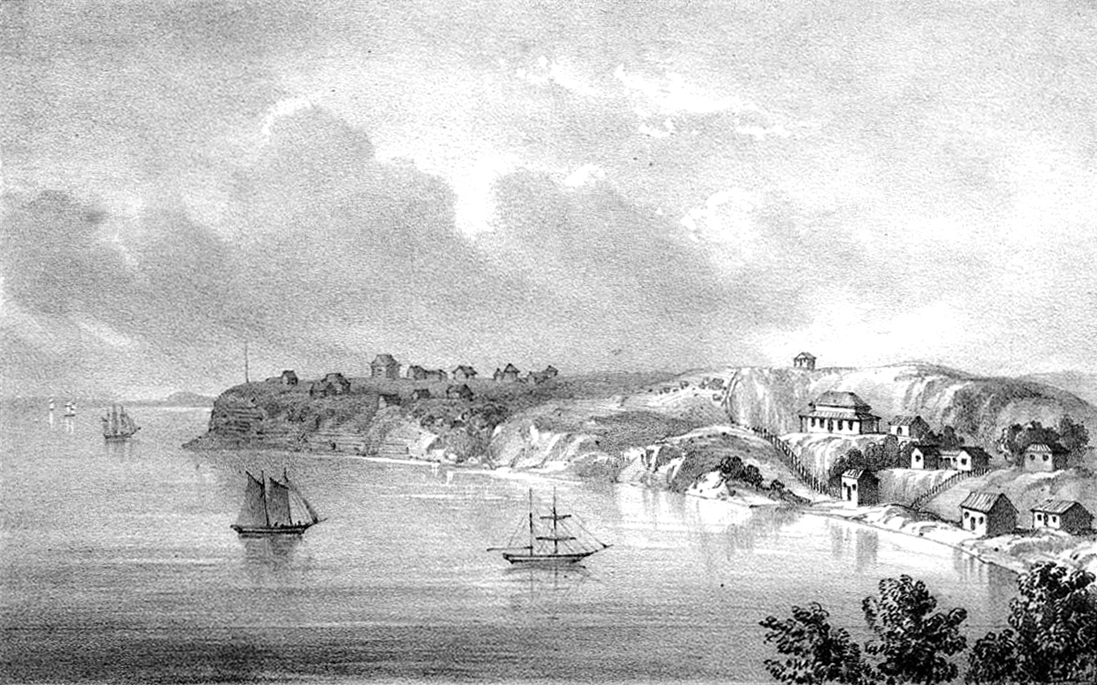
Fort Britomart from the west across Commercial Bay, Auckland, 1842. Artist: Joseph Jenner Merrett

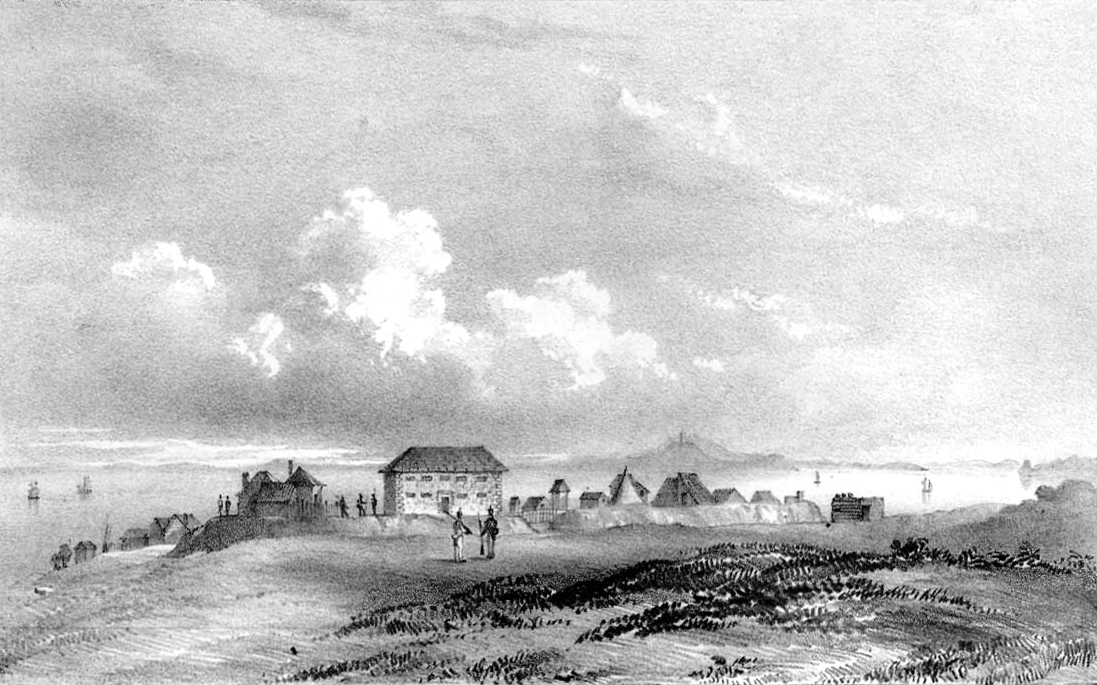
A view from the first St Paul's Church, Auckland, of Fort Britomart and soldiers' barracks built by Bunbury's detachment of the 80th Regiment, 1842. Artist: Joseph Jenner Merrett

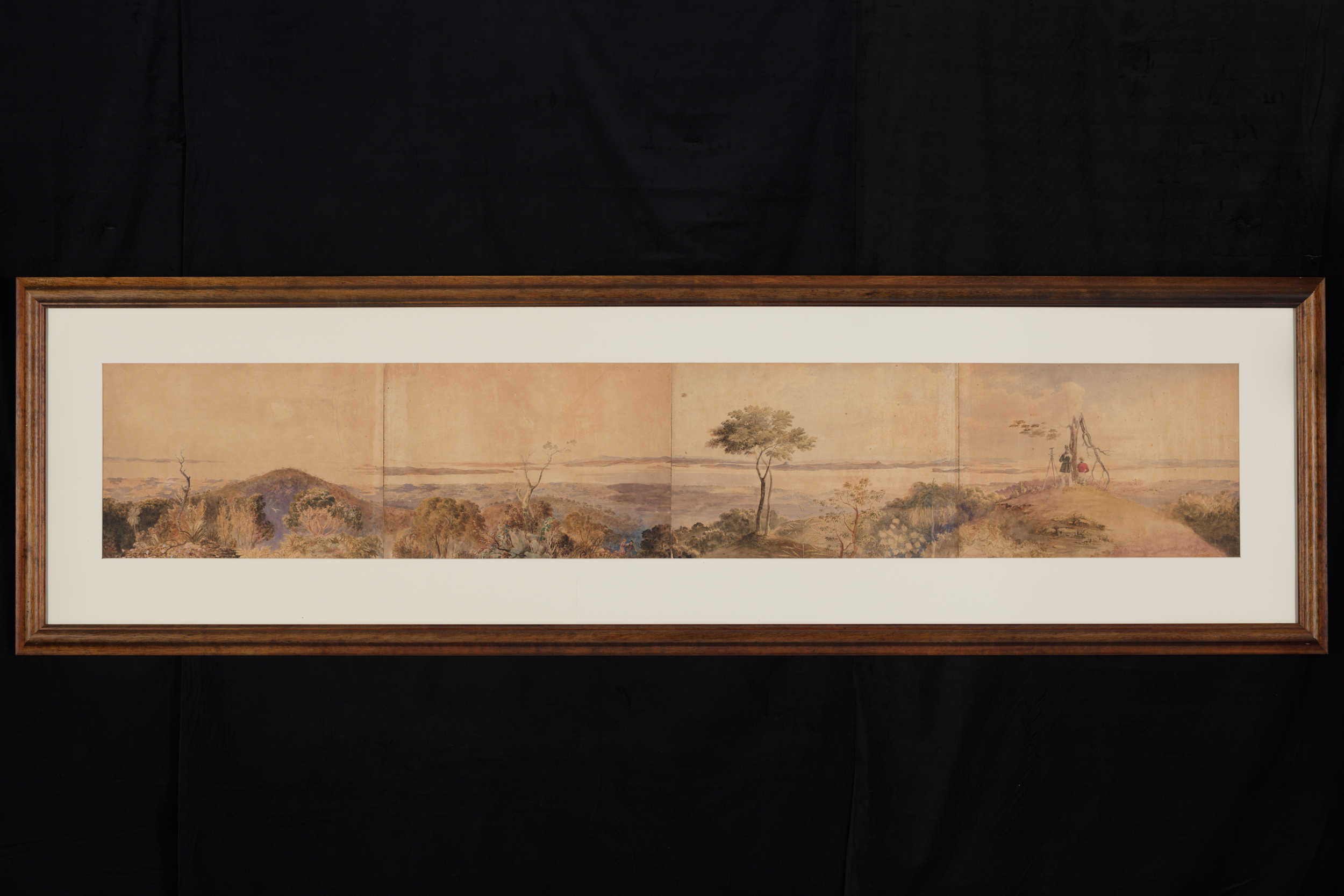
Panoramic view of Waitematā Harbour looking westward from the summit of Rangitoto Island. Artist: Thomas Bunbury

Later in 1844 he was sent to India. While in transit to Calcutta, his ship was wrecked on the Andaman Islands. For his leadership of the 600 odd survivors until they were rescued, he was appointed a Companion of the Order of the Bath. He later served in the First Anglo-Sikh War and was present at most of the major battles of the campaign in India—Mudki, Ferozeshah, Sobraon.

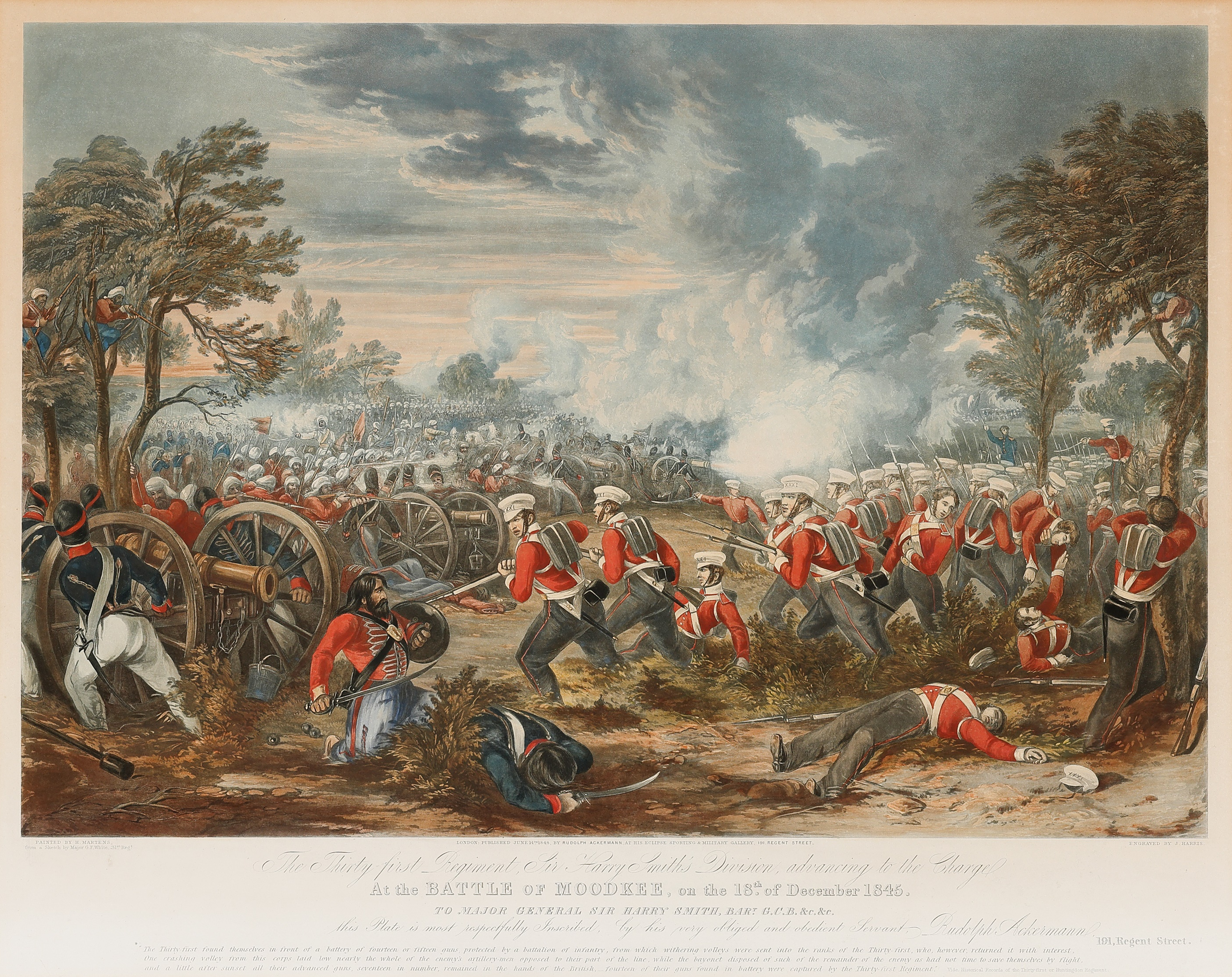
Battle of Mudki, 18 December 1845. Artist: Henry Martens

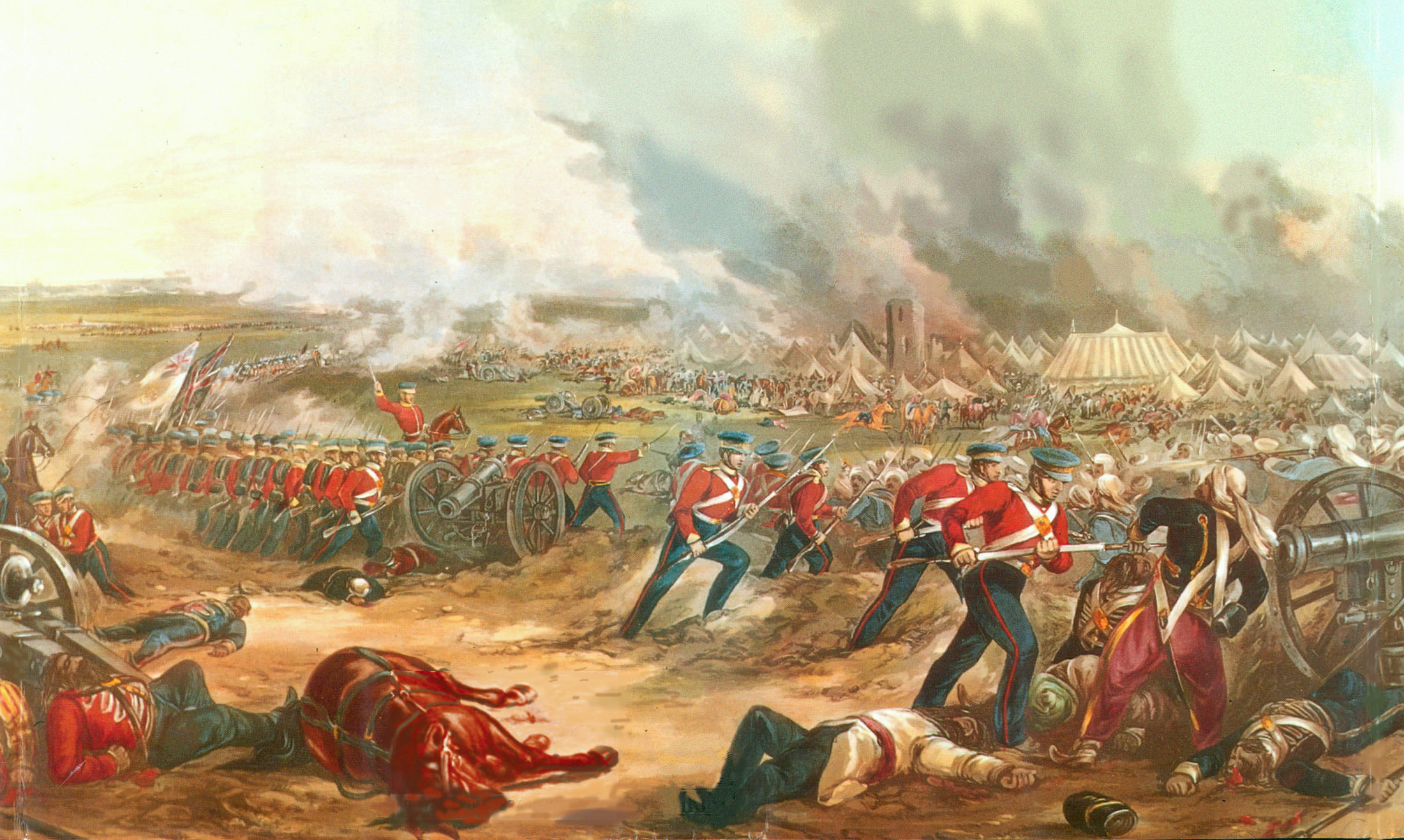
Battle of Ferozeshah, 2nd Day, 22 December 1845. Artist: Henry Martens

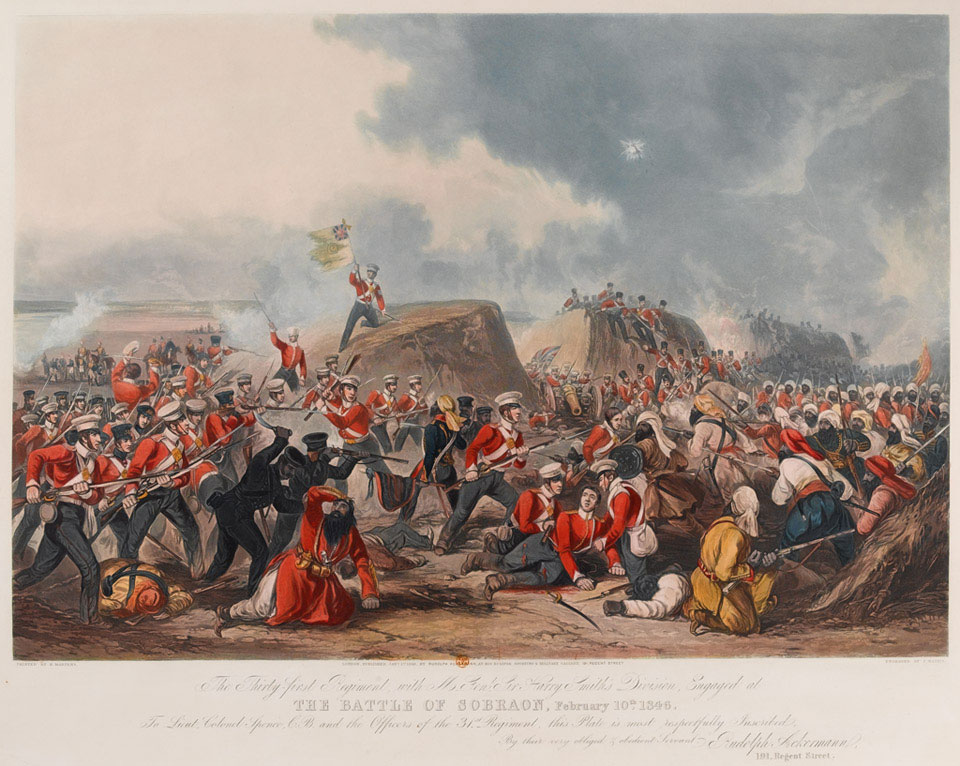
Battle of Sobraon, 10 February 1846. Artist: J. Harris after Henry Martens

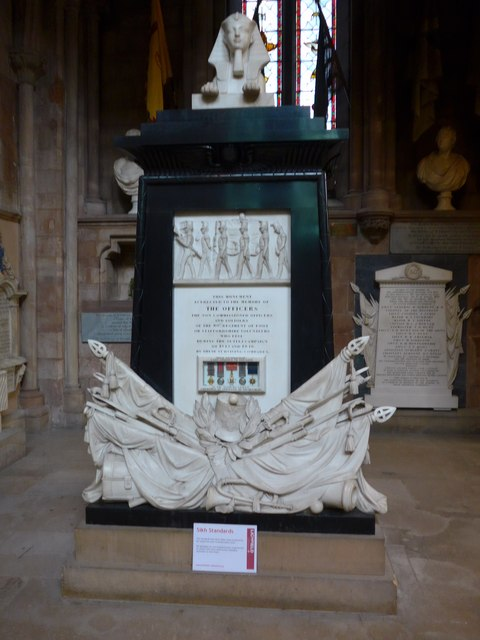
80th Regiment's Sikh War Memorial, Lichfield Cathedral, England, encasing Bunbury's medals.

Bunbury retired from the British Army on 31 December 1849 with the rank of lieutenant colonel and returned to England, marrying soon after his arrival in the country to Clara Matilda Harriott, daughter of W. H. Harriott. He wrote his memoirs which were published in 1861. He died early the following year. His widow died at North Lodge, Hampton Wick, on 24 January 1903.

== Publications ==
- Bunbury, Thomas (1861). Reminiscences of a Veteran: Being Personal and Military Adventures in Portugal, Spain, France, Malta New South Wales, Norfolk Island, New Zealand, Andaman Islands, and India. Vol. 1. London: Charles J. Skeet – via HathiTrust.
- Bunbury, Thomas (1861). Reminiscences of a Veteran: Being Personal and Military Adventures in Portugal, Spain, France, Malta New South Wales, Norfolk Island, New Zealand, Andaman Islands, and India. Vol. 2. London: Charles J. Skeet – via HathiTrust.
- Bunbury, Thomas (1861). Reminiscences of a Veteran: Being Personal and Military Adventures in Portugal, Spain, France, Malta New South Wales, Norfolk Island, New Zealand, Andaman Islands, and India. Vol. 3. London: Charles J. Skeet – via HathiTrust.
