= Battle of Ferozeshah =

1845 battle of the First Anglo-Sikh War

Coordinates: 30.8833°N 74.7833°E

- Part of the First Anglo-Sikh War
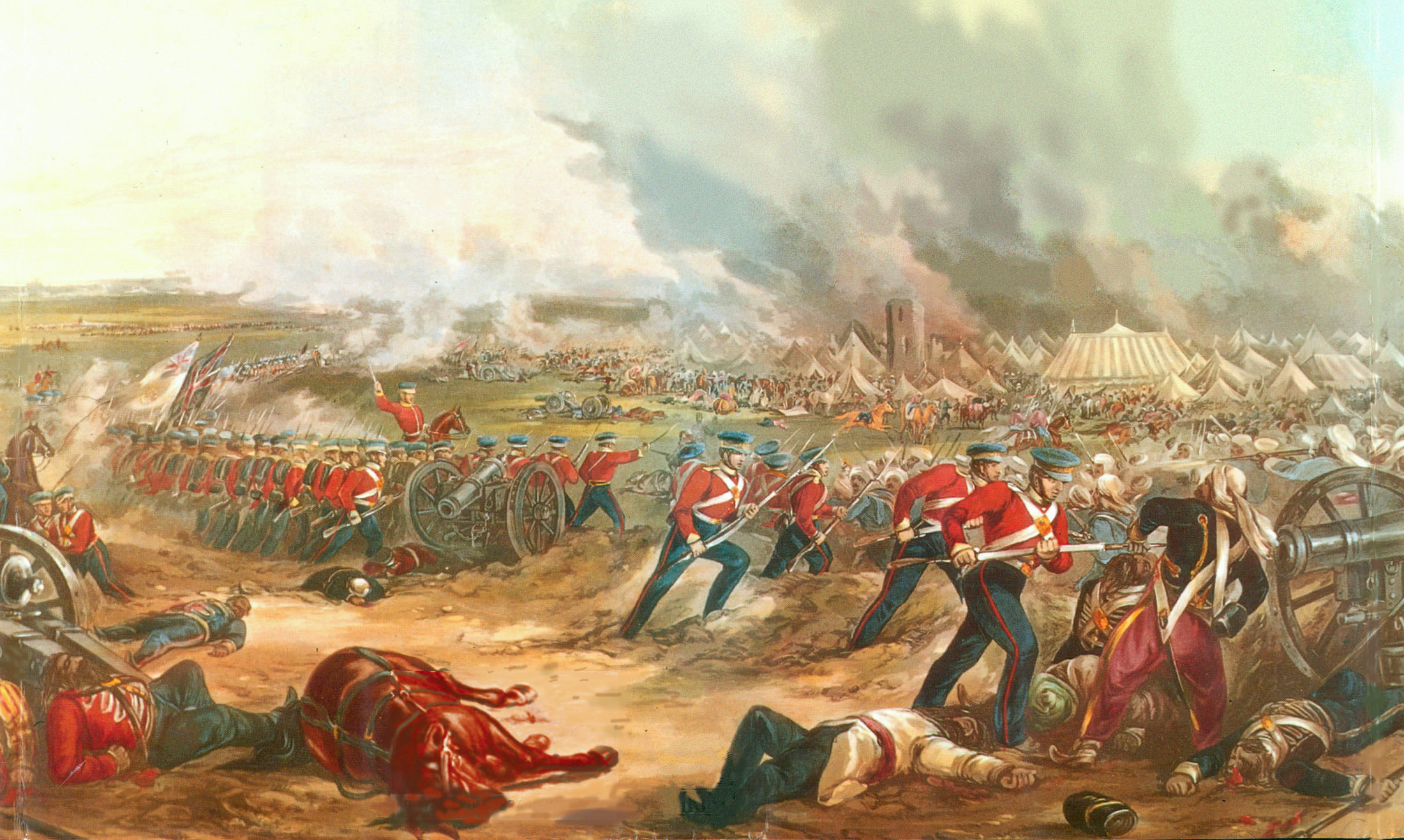
- Battle of Ferozshah (2nd Day), 22 December 1845 by Henry Martens, after a sketch on the spot by Major George Francis White, 31st Foot
| Date | 21–22 December 1845 |
| Location | Ferozeshah, Punjab |
| Result | British victory |

Belligerents
| Sikh Empire | East India Company |

Commanders and leaders
| Lal Singh; Tej Singh | Hugh Gough; Henry Hardinge |

Strength
| 35,000–50,000, of which 30,000 was infantry 98–130 guns | 22,000–35,000; 69 guns 2 howitzers |

Casualties and losses
| 2,000 killed 70 guns | 694 killed 1,721 wounded All 69 guns damaged or destroyed |

The Battle of Ferozeshah was fought on 21 December and 22 December 1845 between the British East India Company and the Sikh Empire, at the village of Ferozeshah in Punjab. The British were led by Sir Hugh Gough and Governor-General Sir Henry Hardinge, while the Sikhs were led by Lal Singh and Tej Singh. The British emerged victorious after treachery from the Sikh commanders caused a Sikh retreat.

== Background ==
The First Anglo-Sikh War broke out as a result of the Sikh Empire of the Punjab falling into disorder after the death of the Maharajah Ranjit Singh in 1839, and the British desire to secure the Punjab. The Sikh army, the Khalsa, was led by some of the contenders for power in the Punjab and its own ambitions for independence and glory into crossing the Sutlej River into territory claimed by the British.

== Moves prior to the battle ==
A British division was already stationed at Ferozepur, and a large army under the Commander-in-Chief of the Bengal Army, Sir Hugh Gough, accompanied by the Governor General, was already marching from the various stations around Delhi toward the frontier. While a detachment of the Sikh army under its commander-in-chief, Tej Singh, advanced on Ferozepur, the main force under Vizier Lal Singh advanced to confront Gough. On 18 December, Lal Singh's advance guard was defeated at the untidy encounter Battle of Mudki.

Gough's army itself was hard-hit and tired by the battle, and made no move on the next day, or the day after. This allowed Lal Singh's army to concentrate at Ferozeshah and fortify its encampment.

Early on 21 December, Gough's army advanced, and came into sight of the Sikh encampment late in the morning. Gough wished to attack immediately. Hardinge thought the odds against the British were too great, and wished to wait for the division from Ferozepur, under Major General Littler, to join the attack. Eventually, Hardinge used his civil appointment as Governor General to overrule Gough.

== The battle ==
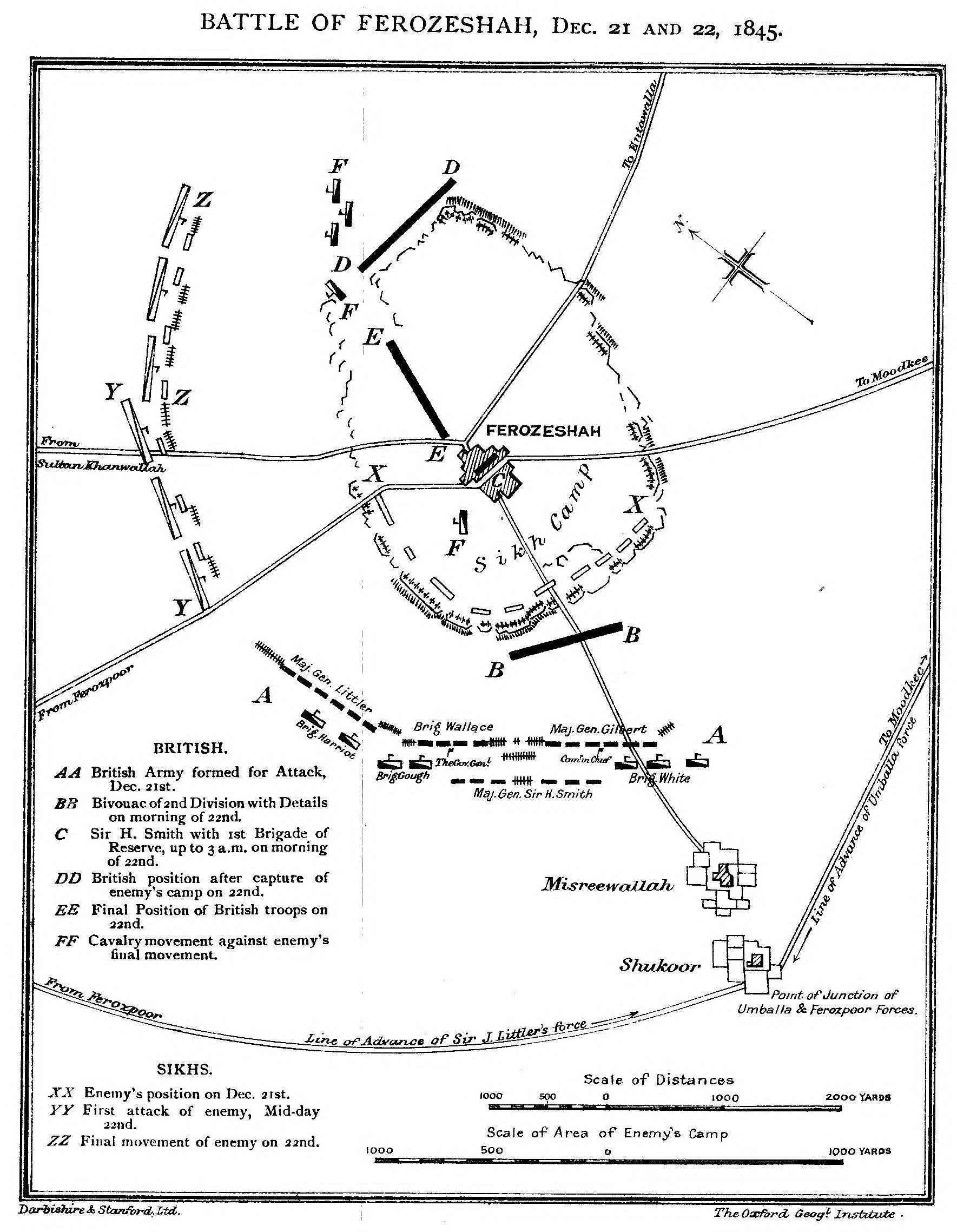
Map of the battle

=== First Day ===
Littler's division appeared in the late afternoon, and deployed on the left of the British line. (The right division was under Major General Sir Walter Gilbert, and a smaller division under Sir Harry Smith was in reserve.)

Gough attacked at about 3:30 pm, on the shortest day of the year. The battle was opened by the British guns moving forward to open a preparatory bombardment. This proved ineffectual. Not only were the Sikh guns more numerous and protected by parapets and entrenchments, they were also far heavier than the British guns, many of which were light guns of the Bengal Horse Artillery. Gough's heavy 18-pounder guns had been left behind at Mudki.

As the artillery duelled, the British and Bengal infantry advanced. General Littler came under heavy fire, and believed only a rush with the bayonet would save his division from annihilation by the Sikh guns. Three of his Bengal regiments held back (being short of water and ammunition), while one of his British regiments (the 62nd Foot) lost almost half its men and was driven back. Part of General Gilbert's division broke into the Sikh encampment, but his own right flank was threatened by large numbers of Sikh irregular cavalry. The Sikh horsemen were driven back by a British cavalry regiment, the 3rd Light Dragoons.

As darkness fell, Sir Harry Smith's division launched a renewed attack, which overran several Sikh batteries and penetrated into the midst of the Sikh camp, around the village of Ferozeshah itself, before being driven back by counter-attacks. Fierce fighting continued until midnight. Many casualties were caused on both sides as a Sikh magazine exploded.

=== Second Day ===
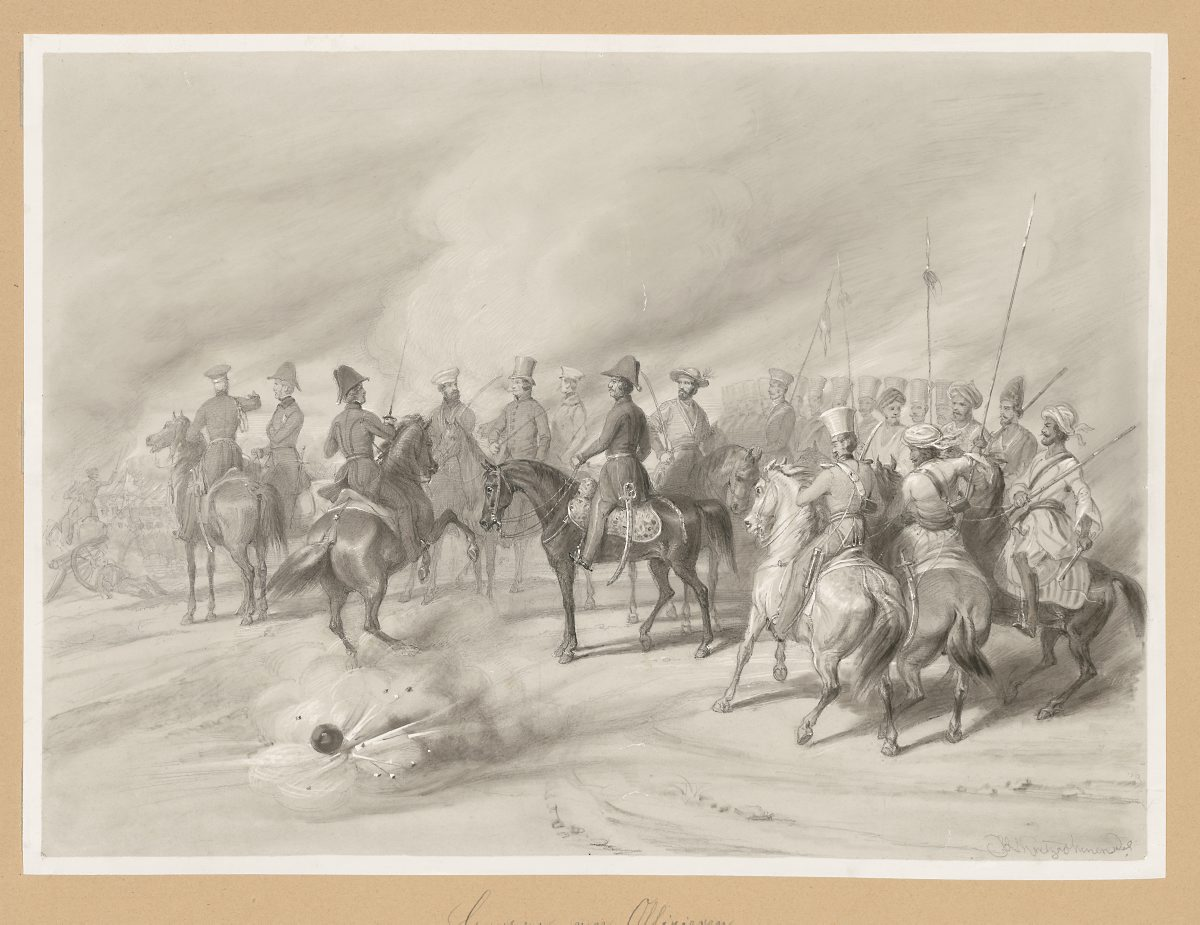
A group of officers during the Battle of Ferozeshah. Lithograph after an original sketch by Prince Waldemar of Prussia and published in 'In Memory of the Travels of Prince Waldemar of Prussia to India 1844-1846' (Vol.II).

Both the British and Sikhs were mixed up in disorder. Gough and Hardinge tried to reform their troops, while keeping up encouraging banter. In fact, Hardinge expected defeat the next day. He sent word to the camp at Mudki that the state papers in his baggage were to be burned in this event, and gave his sword (a spoil of war which had once belonged to Napoleon Bonaparte) to his aide-de-camp.

When dawn broke, it became clear that the British held most of the camp, and had captured seventy-one guns. Reforming their line, Gough and Hardinge advanced north-west and by noon they had driven Lal Singh's army from the field, in spite of heavy losses from the remaining Sikh artillery.

Even as the British were congratulating themselves, they became aware that Tej Singh's army was approaching from the west. Gough's troops were already exhausted and almost out of ammunition. As they formed up again, and came under fire from Tej Singh's guns, a capitulation was seriously considered, to spare the wounded from massacre.

Gough's army was saved when, ironically, some of his horse artillery ran out of ammunition. A staff officer ordered them to withdraw to Ferozepur to replenish, and also ordered much of the British cavalry to escort them. Tej Singh claimed that the movement was an outflanking manoeuvre, and ordered a withdrawal to the north.

== Aftermath ==
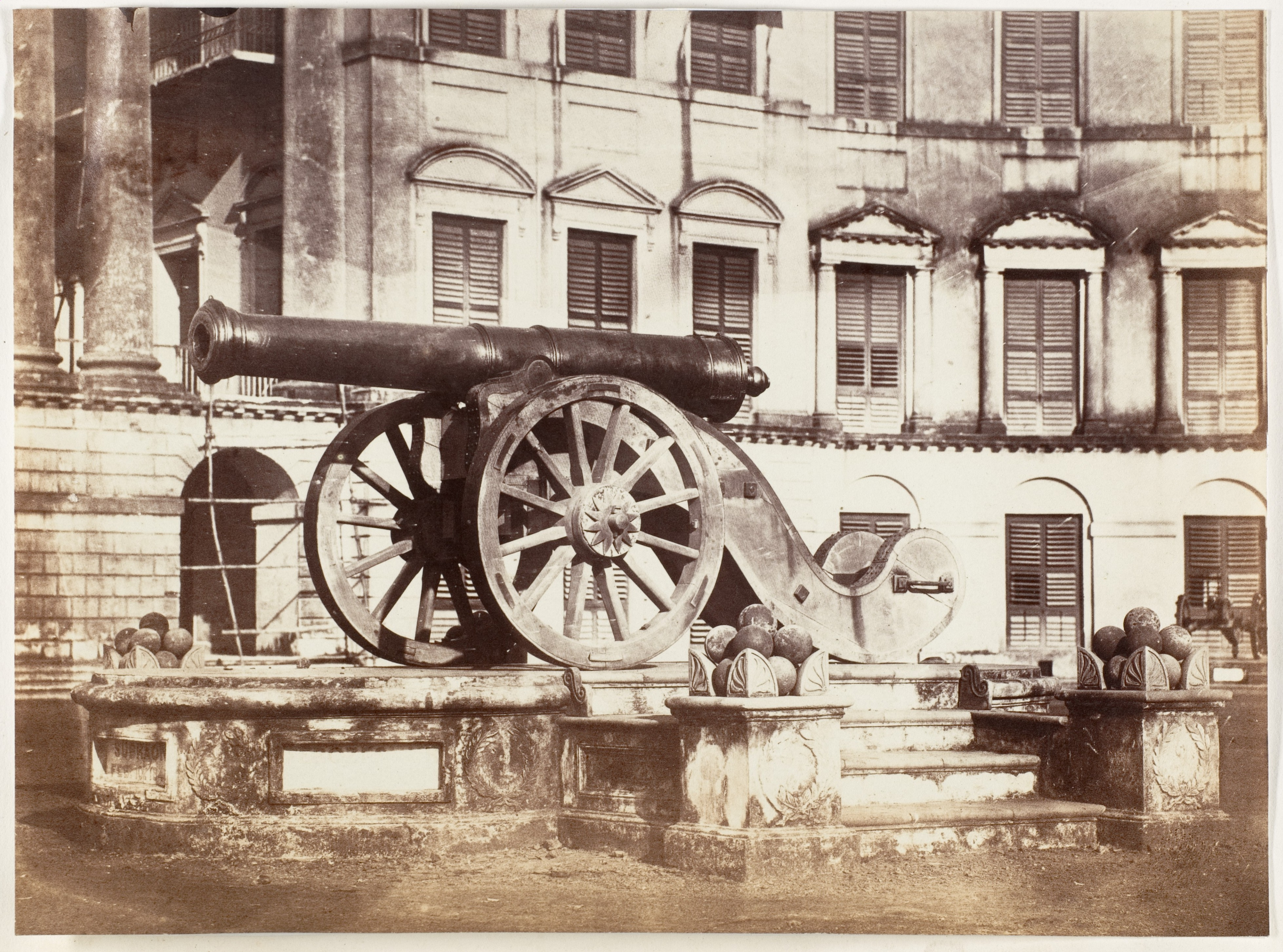
'Great Sikh Gun taken at Ferozshah on the Night of December 21, 1845', photograph taken by John Constantine Stanley, Government House, Calcutta, ca.1858–61

While the Sikhs temporarily withdrew over the Sutlej, Gough's army camped immediately north of the battlefield. They suffered from the stench of the many dead, and many men became ill through drinking from polluted wells. One seventh of the army had been casualties. Hardinge privately criticised Gough's head-on tactics and sought to have him replaced, but no formal change of command could take place for several weeks, by which time events made it unnecessary.

The staff officer whose apparent blunder in sending the guns and cavalry away on the second day had actually saved Gough, a Captain Lumley who was the son of a General, was judged to have been driven temporarily insane by exhaustion and heatstroke and allowed to resign his commission, rather than face a court-martial.

On the Sikh side, there was temporary dismay and much recrimination. It was evident that both Lal Singh and Tej Singh were ineffective and potentially treasonous commanders. Both were Sikhs, that were prominent in the faction which was seeking to curtail the power of the Sikh Khalsa Army to intervene in the Durbar (court and government) of the Punjab. Lal Singh was alleged to have sheltered in a ditch throughout the battle, and although this cannot be proved, it is clear that he took little active part. Tej Singh had used the thinnest pretext to order a retreat when most of his officers and troops were eager to fall on the exhausted British and Bengali armies.

== Order of battle ==
=== British Army ===
- 3rd (The King's Own) Regiment of (Light) Dragoons
- 9th (East Norfolk) Regiment of Foot
- 29th (Worcestershire) Regiment of Foot
- 31st (Huntingdonshire) Regiment of Foot
- 50th (Queen's Own) Regiment of Foot
- 62nd (Wiltshire) Regiment of Foot
- 80th Regiment of Foot (Staffordshire Volunteers)

=== Bengal Army ===
- Governor General's Bodyguard
- 4th Bengal Light Cavalry
- 5th Bengal Light Cavalry
- 8th Bengal Light Cavalry
- Skinner's Horse
- 8th Irregular Cavalry
- 9th Irregular Cavalry
- 1st Bengal European Light Infantry
- 2nd Regiment of Bengal Native Infantry
- 12th Regiment of Bengal Native Infantry
- 14th Regiment of Bengal Native Infantry
- 16th Regiment of Bengal Native Infantry
- 24th Regiment of Bengal Native Infantry
- 26th Regiment of Bengal Native Infantry
- 33rd Regiment of Bengal Native Infantry
- 42nd Regiment of Bengal Native Infantry
- 44th Regiment of Bengal Native Infantry
- 45th Regiment of Bengal Native Infantry
- 47th Regiment of Bengal Native Infantry

== Gallery ==
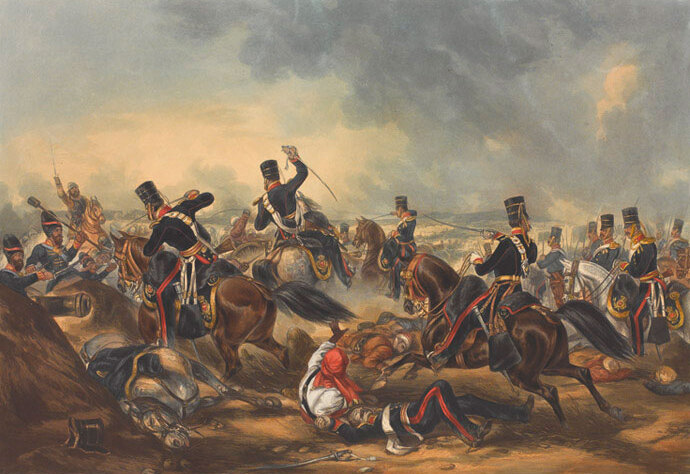
Charge of the 3rd (King's Own) Light Dragoons at the Battle of Ferzshuhur [sic], 21 December 1845.

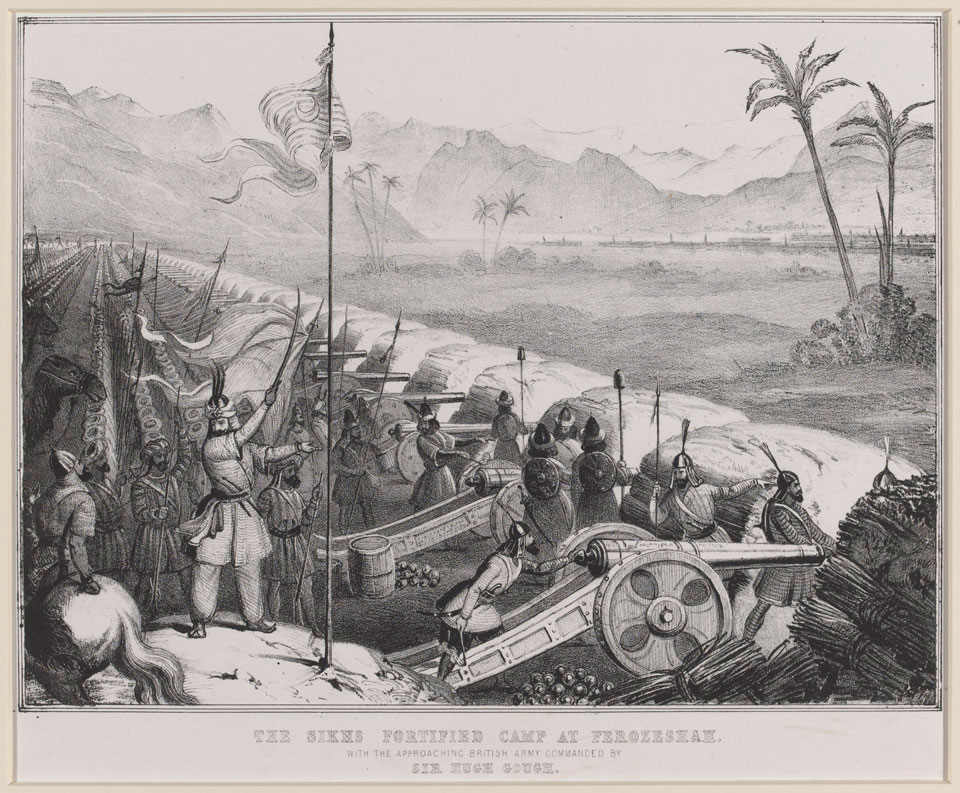
The Sikh fortified camp at Ferozeshah with the approaching British Army commanded by Sir Hugh Gough.

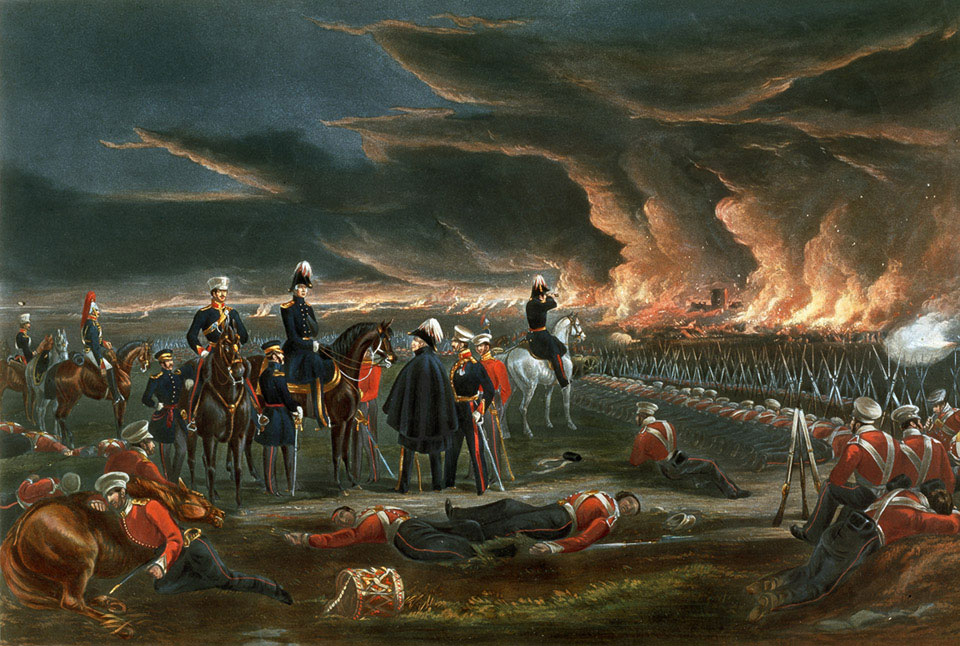
Night bivouac of the British Army at Ferozeshah, 21 December 1845.

== Sources ==
- Ian Hernon,. "Britain's forgotten wars", Sutton Publishing, 2003, ISBN 0-7509-3162-0
- Byron Farwell, "Queen Victoria's little wars", Wordsworth Military Library, 1999, ISBN 1-84022-216-6
