= Sutlej Medal =

1846 British campaign medal

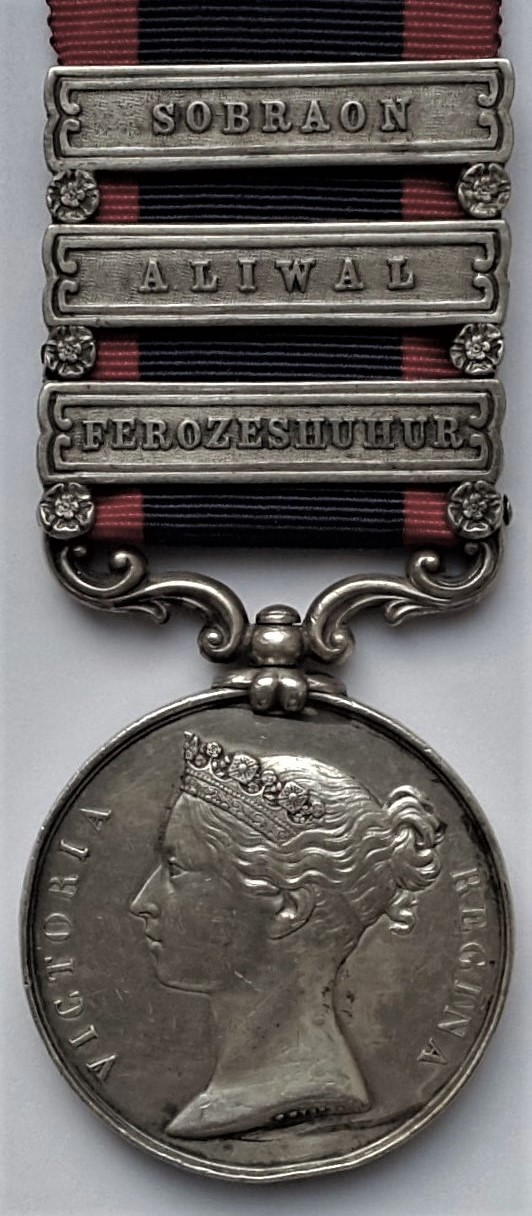
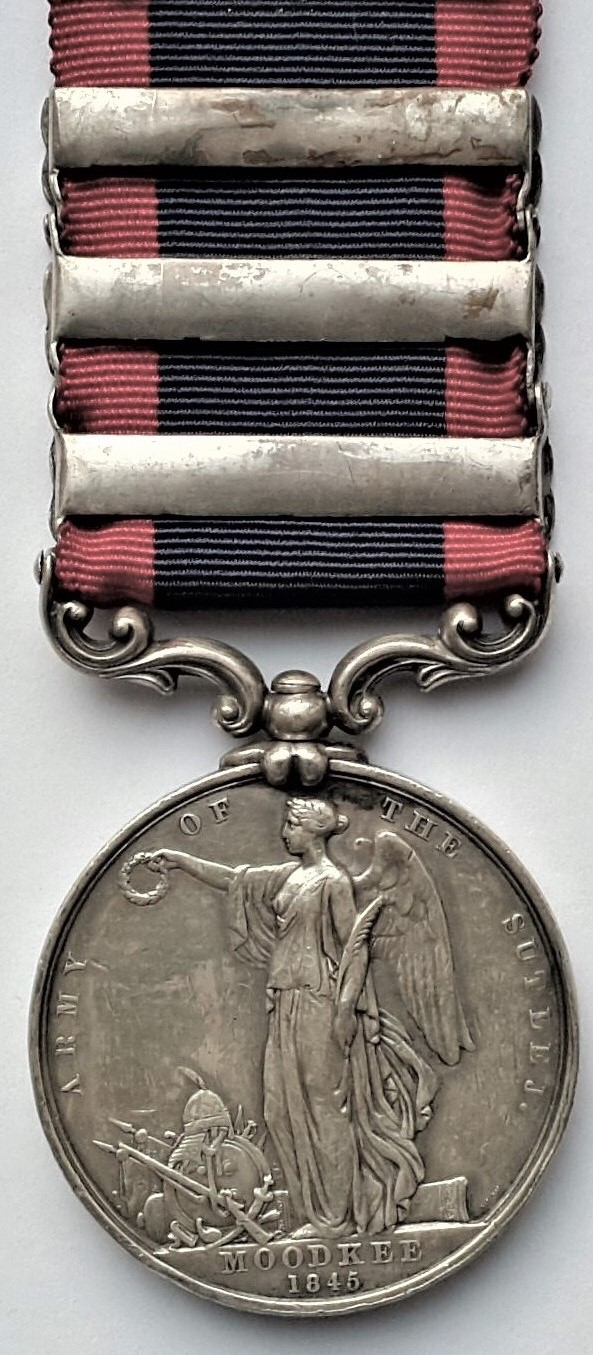
- Obverse and reverse of the medal
- Type: Campaign medal
- Awarded for: Campaign service.
- Description: Silver disk, 36mm diameter.
- Presented by: United Kingdom of Great Britain and Ireland
- Eligibility: British and Honourable East India Company forces.
- Campaign: Sutlej 1845–46.
- Clasps: Ferozeshuhur; Aliwal; Sobraon
- Established: 17 April 1846
- Ribbon bar of the medal

The Sutlej Medal was a campaign medal approved in 1846, for issue to officers and men of the British Army and Honourable East India Company who served in the Sutlej campaign of 1845–46 (also known as the First Anglo-Sikh War). This medal was the first to use clasps to denote soldiers who fought in the major battles of the campaign.

The medal was approved on 17 April 1846.

== Description ==
- A circular silver medal, 36 millimetres (1.4 in) in diameter, designed by William Wyon.
- Obverse: The diademed head of Queen Victoria with the legend VICTORIA REGINA.
- Reverse: A standing figure of victory, facing left and holding a wreath in her outstretched hand, with a collection of trophies at her feet. Around the circumference is the legend ARMY OF THE SUTLEJ, with the name and year of the first battle in which the recipient served below.
- The recipient's name and unit are impressed on the rim of the medal in capital letters or roman skeleton lettering.
- Ribbon: The 31.7 millimetres (1.25 in) wide ribbon is dark blue with crimson edges.

== Clasps ==
The Sutlej Medal commemorates four battles. The first in which the recipient participated is shown on the reverse of the medal, with any further battles indicated by a clasp. As there was no battle prior to the battle of Moodkee no clasp was produced for this action.
The three clasps awarded were for the battles of:

- Ferozeshuhur
- Aliwal
- Sobraon

== Bibliography ==
- Mackay, J and Mussel, J (eds) - Medals Yearbook - 2005, (2004), Token Publishing.
- Joslin, Litherland, and Simpkin (eds), British Battles and Medals, (1988), Spink
