= 80th Regiment of Foot (Staffordshire Volunteers) =

80th (Staffordshire Volunteers) Regiment of Foot
- Active: 1793–1881
- Country: Kingdom of Great Britain (1793–1800); United Kingdom (1801–1881)
- Branch: British Army
- Type: Infantry Regiment
- Role: Infantry
- Size: 1 battalion
- Garrison/HQ: Whittington Barracks, Lichfield
- Nickname: The Staffordshire Knots
- Colors: Yellow facings
- Anniversaries: Battle of Ferozeshah, 21 December
- Engagements: French Revolutionary Wars; Second Anglo-Maratha War; Travancore War; First Anglo-Sikh War; Indian Rebellion; Perak War; Anglo-Zulu War

The 80th Regiment of Foot (Staffordshire Volunteers) was an infantry regiment of the British Army, raised in 1793. Under the Childers Reforms it amalgamated with the 38th (1st Staffordshire) Regiment of Foot to form the South Staffordshire Regiment in 1881.

== History ==
=== Formation ===
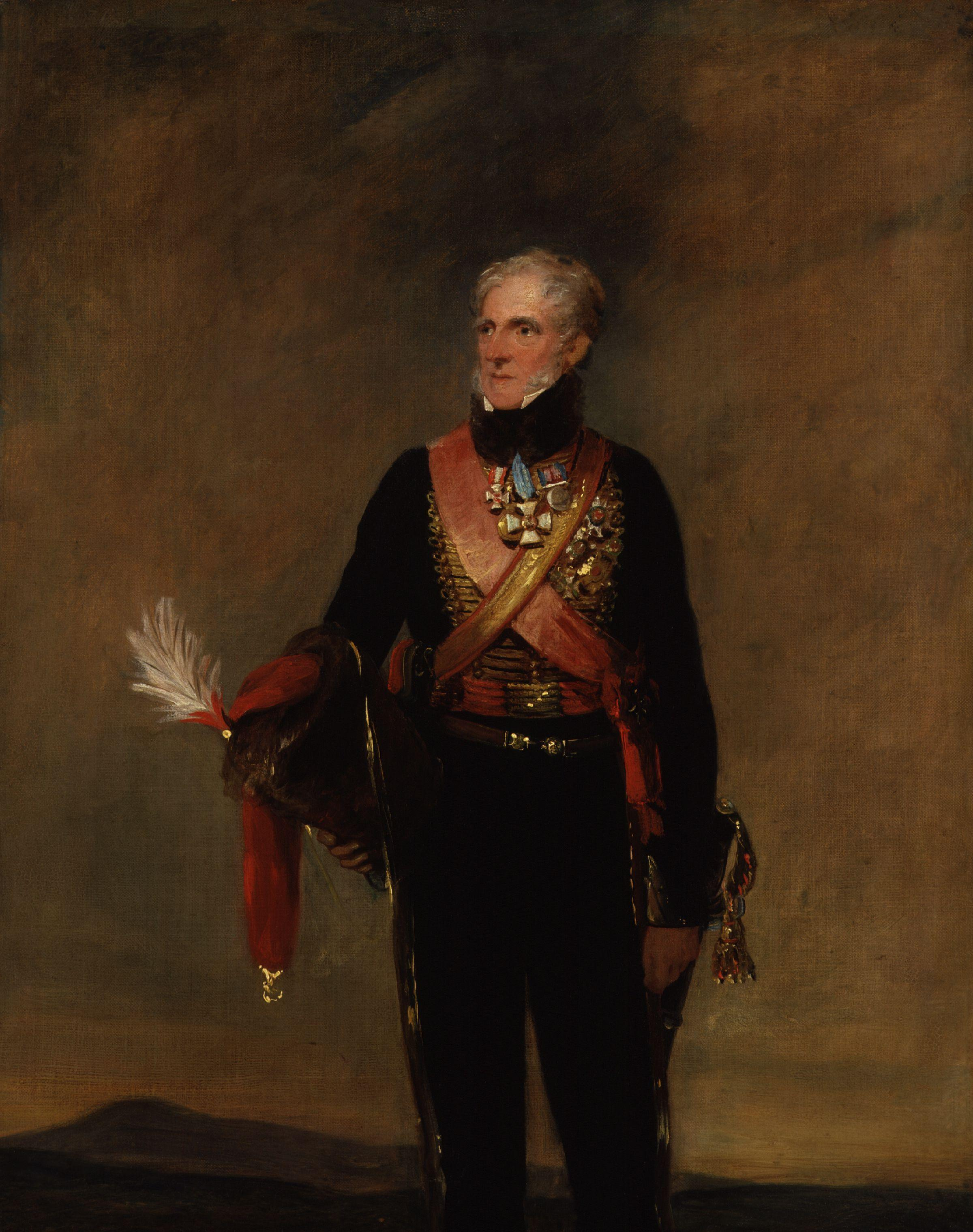
Henry, Lord Paget, founder of the regiment

The regiment was raised by Henry, Lord Paget as the 80th Regiment of Foot, in response to the threat posed by the French Revolution, on 9 December 1793. The regiment was largely recruited from the Staffordshire Militia and comprised men living on the estates of Paget's father, The Earl of Uxbridge.

=== French Revolutionary Wars ===
Within three months of raising the 80th Foot were stationed in Guernsey from where they sailed to Flanders. They remained there until 1795, and were evacuated at the end of a disastrous campaign which ended in a decisive French victory. They remained in England for only a short time as they formed part of a force formed to assist in the landing of French Royalist troops on the Île d'Yeu off the Vendée coast of France. Arriving on the island in September 1795 in an already weakened state, the 80th Foot had lost half of its strength by the time it was forced to return to Britain in January 1796.

Following the French conquest of the Netherlands the Batavian Republic had been established in 1795, taking over the various Dutch colonial possessions, and declaring war on Great Britain. The British quickly seized control of the Cape of Good Hope from the Dutch and in 1796 the 80th Foot arrived in the territory, taking part in an operation to capture a Dutch naval squadron in August of that year.

=== Egyptian campaign ===
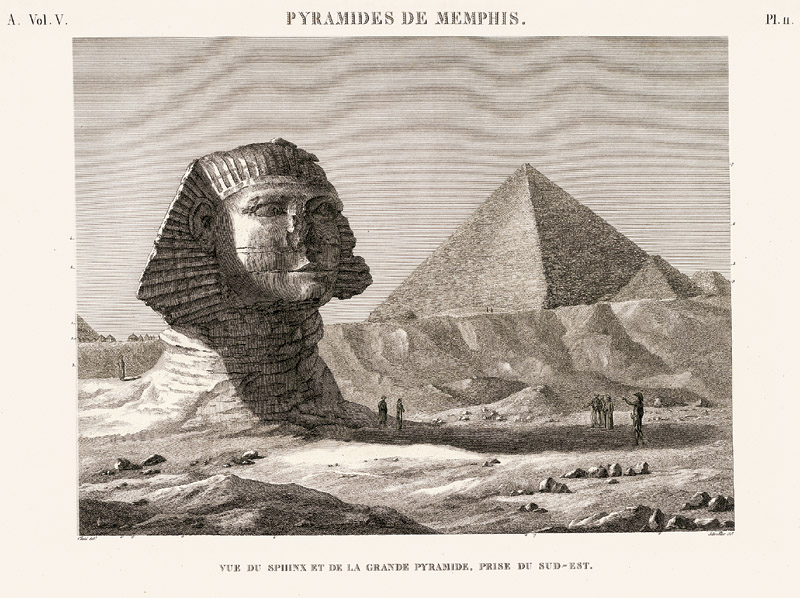
The Great Sphinx of Giza, early 19th century

In December 1796 the regiment sailed for Ceylon, arriving in January of the following year. In 1801 the 80th were dispatched to Egypt as part of a force seeking to dislodge French forces there that threatened access to India. Parts of the regiment were shipwrecked and they did not come into contact with the enemy, but they were awarded the badge of a "sphinx superscribed Egypt" along with other units that took part in the campaign.

=== India 1803–1817 ===
In 1802, following the Treaty of Amiens the various volunteer corps that had been formed during the war were to be disbanded. The Staffordshire Volunteers, which had been raised in 1798, chose to be merged with the 80th Foot, which became the 80th Regiment of Foot (Staffordshire Volunteers). In the same year the 80th sailed back to India, again suffering shipwreck on the journey. They remained in India until 1817, fighting in the Second Anglo-Maratha War of 1803–1805 making punitive expeditions against the Nairs of Wayanad and Calicut and seeing service in the Travancore War of 1808–1809. They remained in southern India until 1817.

=== The Victorian era ===
Following a recruiting drive to bring it up to strength, the 80th Foot undertook police duties in Glasgow. In 1820 they briefly moved to Ireland before being posted to the garrison at Gibraltar. They were subsequently stationed in Malta and the Ionian Islands, a British protectorate at the time. In 1831–36 they were based in England or Ireland, at times giving aid to the civil authorities in a police or anti-riot role.

In 1836 the regiment was given the duty of escorting convicts to Australia; small detachments of the 80th undertook the journey over several months. The regiment spent seven years in New South Wales with detachments on Norfolk Island and in New Zealand. Major Thomas Bunbury of the 80th Foot was made the representative of the Governor of New Zealand to arrange the signing of the Treaty of Waitangi at various locations in the South Island during May and June 1840, establishing British sovereignty there.

=== India ===
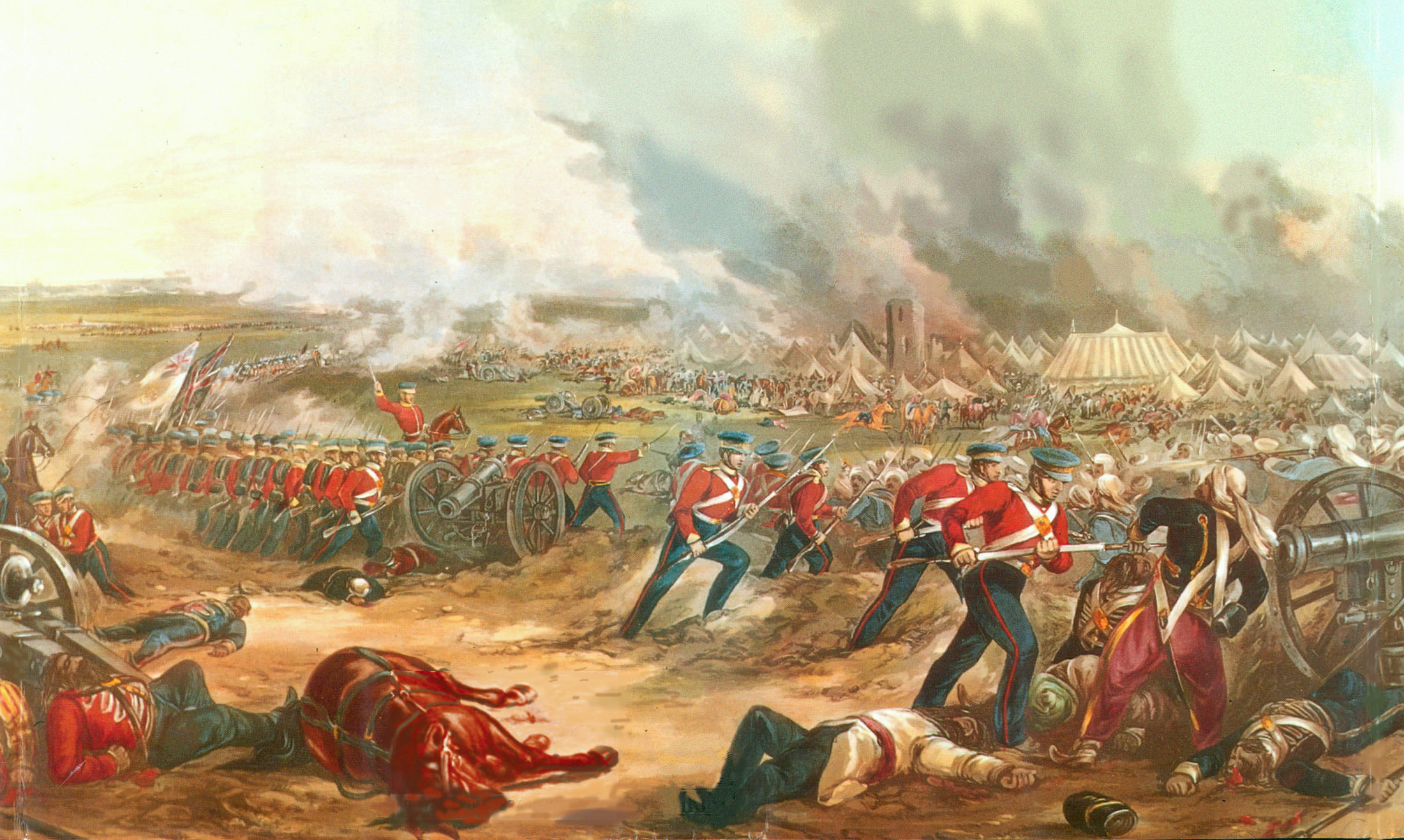
The Battle of Ferozeshah in December 1845, by Henry Martens

After returning to Sydney in 1844, the regiment sailed for India. Part of the regiment again suffered shipwreck when the sailing ship Briton ran aground on the Andaman Islands in November 1844. The regiment arrived in India just as the conflict in the Punjab later known as the First Anglo-Sikh War broke out. They fought at the Battles of Mudki and Ferozeshah in December 1845 and the Battle of Sobraon in February 1846. Ferozeshah became celebrated as a regimental anniversary on 21 December thereafter, and is still marked by the successor 3rd Battalion Mercian Regiment.

Regimental troops storming the Shwedagon Pagoda on 12 April 1852

Stationed in Lahore from 1846 until 1852, in that year it fought in the Second Anglo-Burmese War which saw the East India company annex the province of Pegu. Returning to India in 1853, the 80th sailed back to the United Kingdom in the following year, where they were brought up to full strength by recruiting parties. By 1855 the regiment was stationed at Fort George in Scotland.

In 1856 they moved to the Cape Colony. The Indian Rebellion of 1857 broke out in May and the 80th arrived in Calcutta in February 1858. Broken into small parties, some mounted on camels, they took part in the Central India Campaign. Although the war ended in June 1858 the 80th Foot remained for nearly nine years, arriving back in England in 1867.

In 1872 the regiment was sent to Singapore, shortly thereafter moving to Hong Kong. Three companies took part in the Perak War in Malaysia in 1875.

=== South Africa ===
In 1876 the 80th were ordered to South Africa, arriving in Natal in 1877. Members of the regiment built Fort Amiel, named after Major Charles Frederick Amiel. They subsequently took part in the Anglo-Zulu War of 1879–80, initially suffering heavy casualties before playing a major part in the Battle of Ulundi under the command of Major (later General) Charles Tucker. Tucker went on to be colonel of the South Staffordshire Regiment. The regiment left South Africa in 1880, sailing to Ireland where they were stationed in Tralee.

As part of the Cardwell Reforms of the 1870s, where single-battalion regiments were linked together to share a single depot and recruiting district in the United Kingdom, the 80th was linked with the 38th (1st Staffordshire) Regiment of Foot, and assigned to district no. 19 at Whittington Barracks in Lichfield. On 1 July 1881 the Childers Reforms came into effect and the regiment amalgamated with the 38th (1st Staffordshire) Regiment of Foot to form the South Staffordshire Regiment.

== Battle honours ==
The 80th Foot were granted the following battle honours for display on the regimental colours:

- The Sphinx superscribed "Egypt"
- Moodkee
- Ferozeshah
- Sobraon
- Pegu
- Central India
- South Africa 1878-9

== Victoria Cross recipients ==
Two members of the 80th Foot were awarded the Victoria Cross, both for actions during the Anglo-Zulu War:

- Colour Sergeant Anthony Clarke Booth (for actions at the Battle of Intombe on 12 March 1879)
- Private Samuel Wassall (for actions at the Battle of Isandlwana on 22 January 1879).

== List of colonels ==
=== 80th Regiment of Foot ===
- 1793–1795: General Lord Henry Paget, later Marquess of Anglesey.
- 1795–1800: General John Hayes St Leger
- 1800–1808: General Gerard Lake, Baron Lake from 1807 and Viscount Lake from 1808

=== 80th Regiment of Foot (Staffordshire Volunteers) – (1802) ===
- 1808–1815: General Edward Paget (knighted 1812)
- 1815–1825: General Sir Alexander Campbell, 1st Baronet
- 1825–1837: General Sir Rufane Shaw Donkin
- 1837–1844: Lieutenant-General Sir John Taylor
- 1844–1848: Lieutenant-General Sir Maurice Charles O'Connell
- 1848–1850: Major-General Sir Edmund Keynton Williams
- 1850–1853: Lieutenant-General Henry Daubeney
- 1853–1854: Lieutenant-General Lawrence Arguimbau
- 1854–1855: Lieutenant-General Sir Thomas Henry Browne
- 1855–1864: General Thomas William Robbins
- 1864–1867: Lieutenant-General James Robert Young
- 1867–1874: Lieutenant-General Henry John French
- 1874–1875: General Charles Crutchley
- 1875–1881: General Sir Richard Wilbraham
