= Samuel Wassall =

Recipient of the Victoria Cross (1856–1927)

Samuel Wassall VC
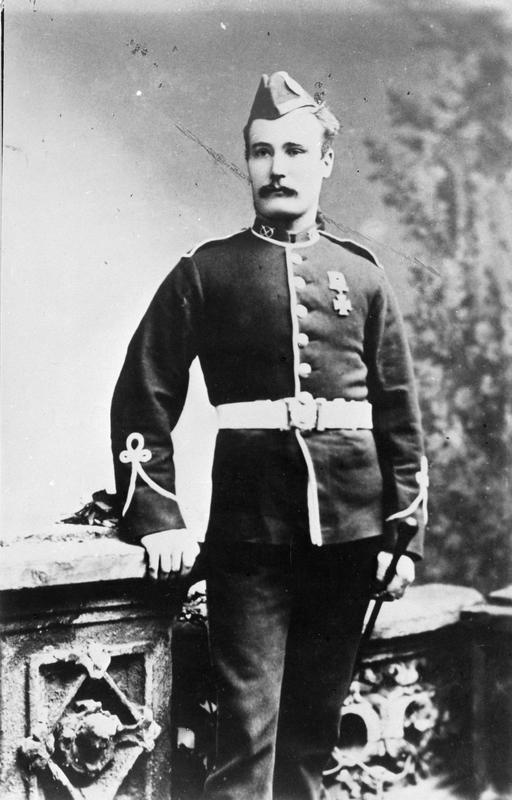
- Born: 28 July 1856; Deritend, Birmingham, Warwickshire, England
- Died: 31 January 1927 (aged 70); Barrow-in-Furness
- Burial place: Barrow-in-Furness Cemetery
- Military career
- Allegiance: United Kingdom
- Branch: British Army
- Rank: Private
- Units: 80th Regiment of Foot
- Conflicts: Anglo-Zulu War – Battle of Isandlwana
- Awards: Victoria Cross

Samuel Wassall VC (28 July 1856 – 31 January 1927) was an English recipient of the Victoria Cross, the highest and most prestigious award for gallantry in the face of the enemy that can be awarded to British and Commonwealth forces.

== Details ==
Wassall was 22 years old, and a private in the 80th Regiment of Foot (later The South Staffordshire Regiment), British Army during the Anglo-Zulu War when the following deed took place on 22 January 1879 at the Battle of Isandlwana, Zululand, South Africa, for which he was awarded the VC:

For his gallant conduct in having, at the imminent risk of his own life, saved that of Private Westwood, of the same regiment. On the 22nd January, 1879, when the Camp at Isandhlwana was taken by the enemy, Private Wassail retreated towards the Buffalo River, in which he saw a comrade struggling, and apparently drowning. He rode to the bank, dismounted, leaving his horse on the Zulu side, rescued the man from the stream, and again mounted his horse, dragging Private Westwood across the river under a heavy shower of bullets.

.

== The medal ==
His Victoria Cross is displayed at the Museum of the Staffordshire Regiment in Whittington, Staffordshire.

== Legacy ==
A street in Lichfield was named "Wassall Lane" as a tribute to Samuel Wassall in 2007.
