= Fort Amiel Museum =

- Location of Fort Amiel
- Established: 29 August 1947
- Location: Newcastle, KwaZulu-Natal, South Africa
- Coordinates: 27.7466°S 29.9215°E
- Type: Military museum
- Website: museumsofkzn.co.za/fort%20amiel.html

Fort Amiel Museum is in Newcastle, KwaZulu-Natal, South Africa.

Fort Amiel was constructed in 1876 by Major Charles Frederick Amiel and soldiers of the 80th Staffordshire Volunteers. It was built as a fort and "look-out post", for the British during the run up to the annexation of the former Transvaal and the Zulu War, although it really never served that purpose.

During the First Boer War it was used as a garrison for the King's Own Royal Regiment (Lancaster).

Fort Amiel served as a commissariat depot, transit camp and hospital. Many wounded soldiers were taken there, to recover from their wounds. The fort is positioned on a knoll overlooking the original wagon drift across the Ncandu River. It has views of the Drakensberg mountain range and the town of Newcastle.

Major Charles Frederick Amiel was born on 2 August 1822, in Hanover Square, London, England. He was christened on 2 August 1822 in St Peter, Chertsey, Surrey, England. Major Amiel died on 10 September 1885 at London, England. He was buried at St Peter, Westminster, London. Amiel never married.

The fort and surroundings, including a graveyard below the knoll fell into disuse for many years. In 1979 the site was declared a National Monument and restoration work began after the discovery of the original plans for the fort during this period in a London Museum. The restoration work was undertaken by the visionary Newcastle Town Council and in conjunction with the Natal Museum Services.

Today, Fort Amiel houses an historic/cultural museum, featuring military displays of the two Anglo-Boer Wars. There is a wonderful cookhouse re-construction, showing a typical British Army Base found in the 1880s.

An addition to the fort and museum is a Zulu umuzi (hut) with a detailed interior.

== See also ==
- List of Castles and Fortifications in South Africa

== Gallery ==
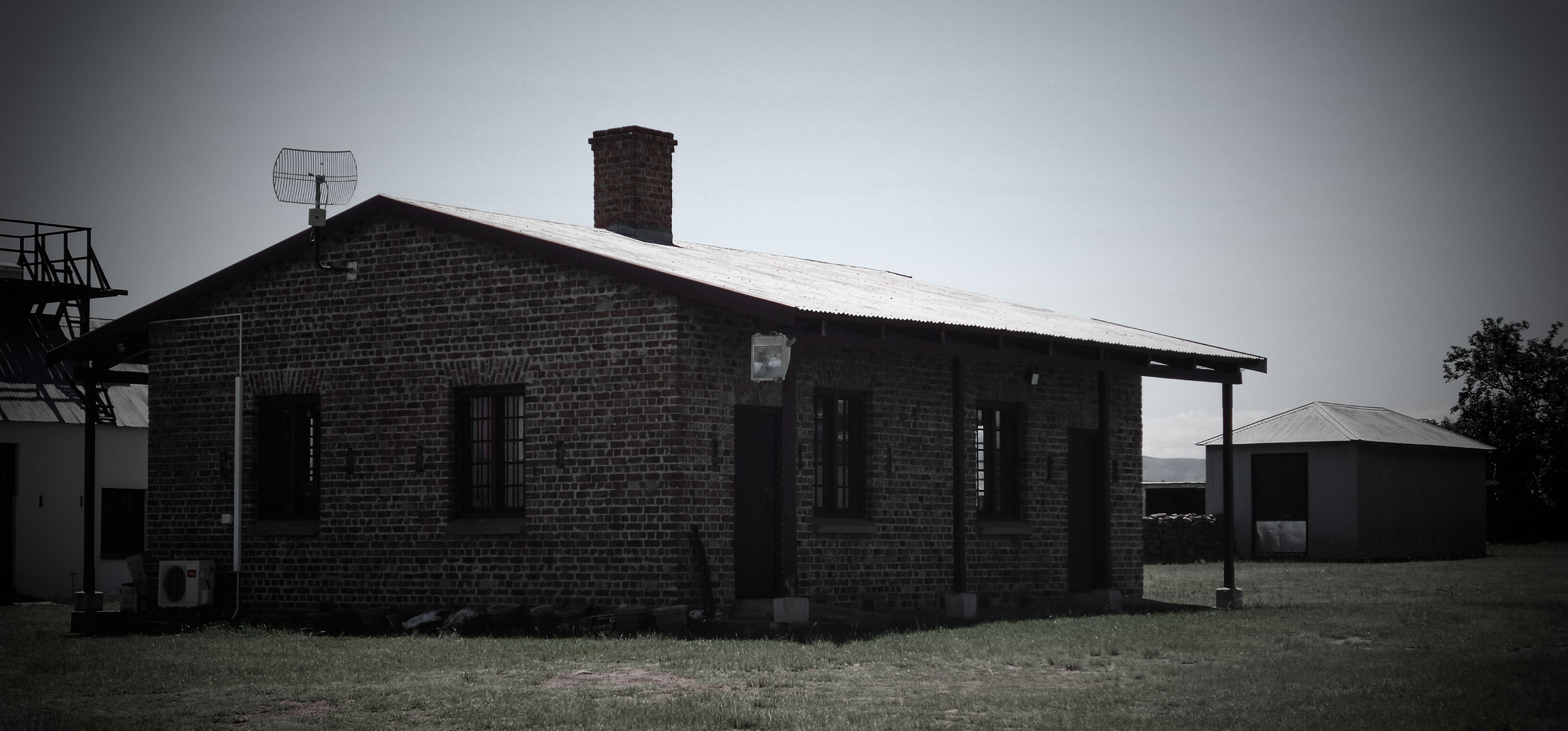

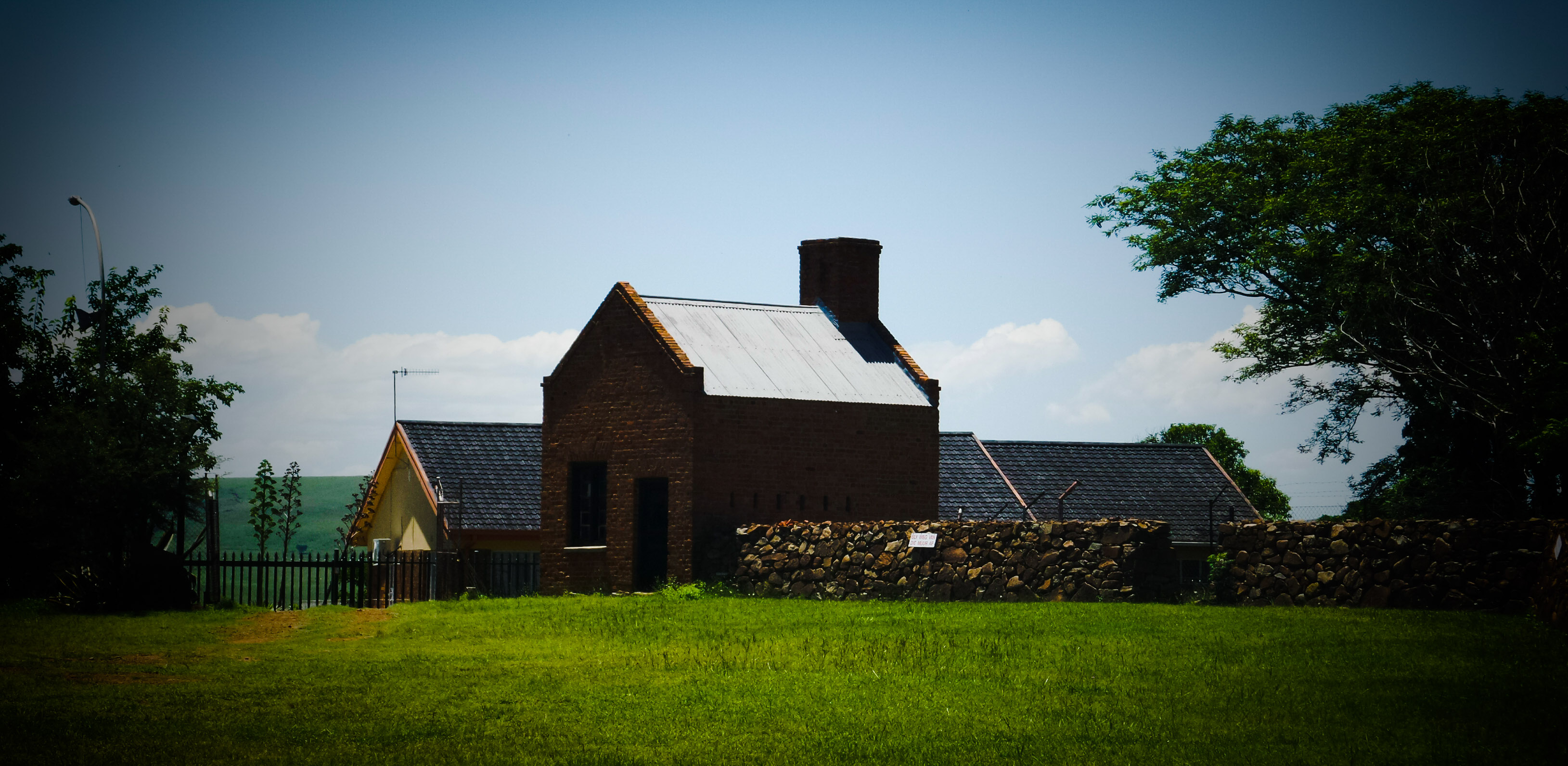

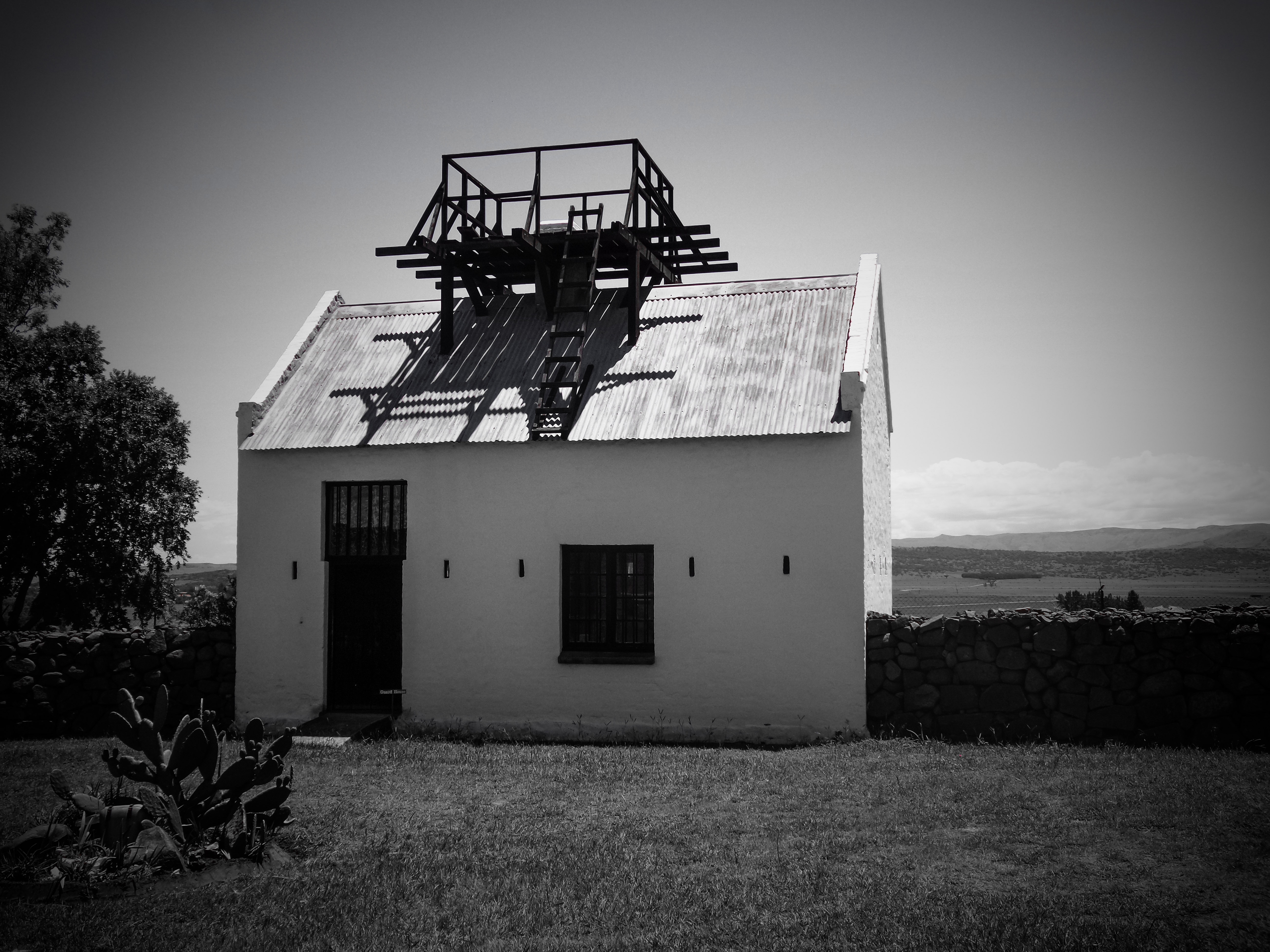

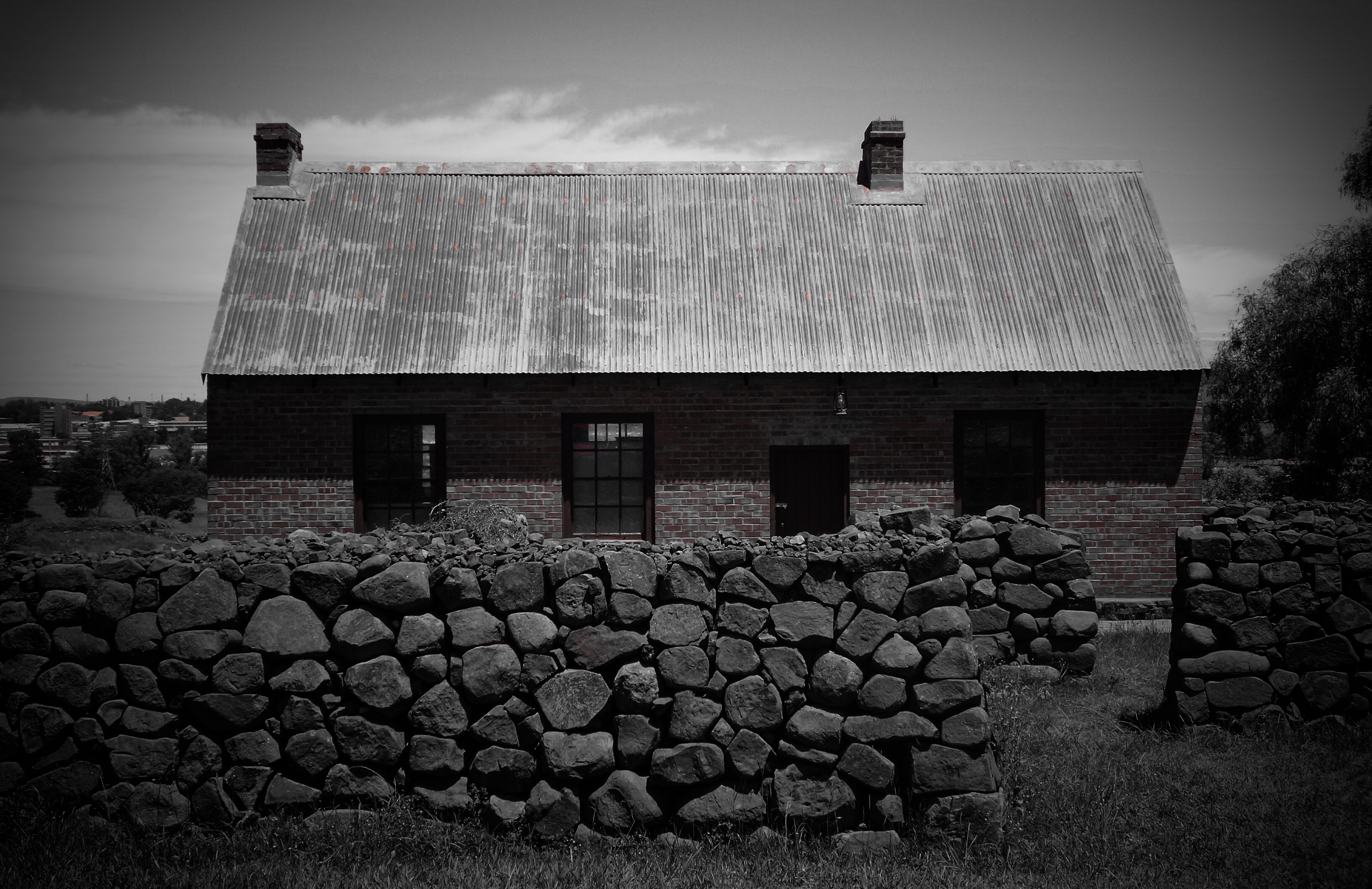

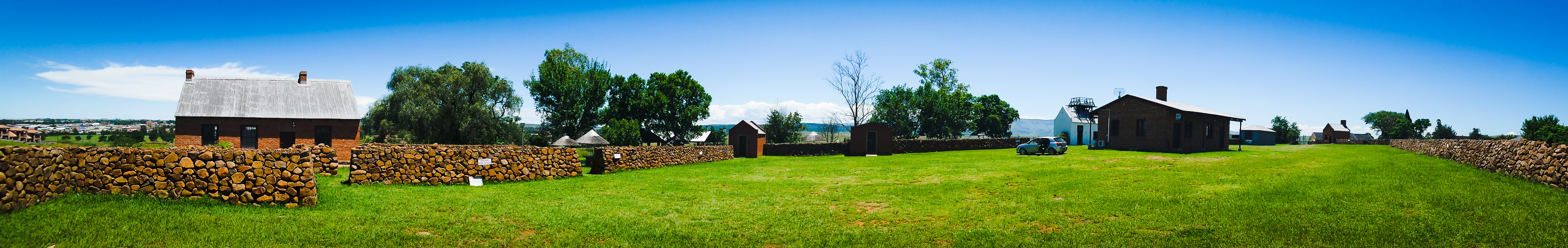
