= Battle of Mudki =

1845 battle of First Anglo-Sikh War

- Part of the First Anglo-Sikh War
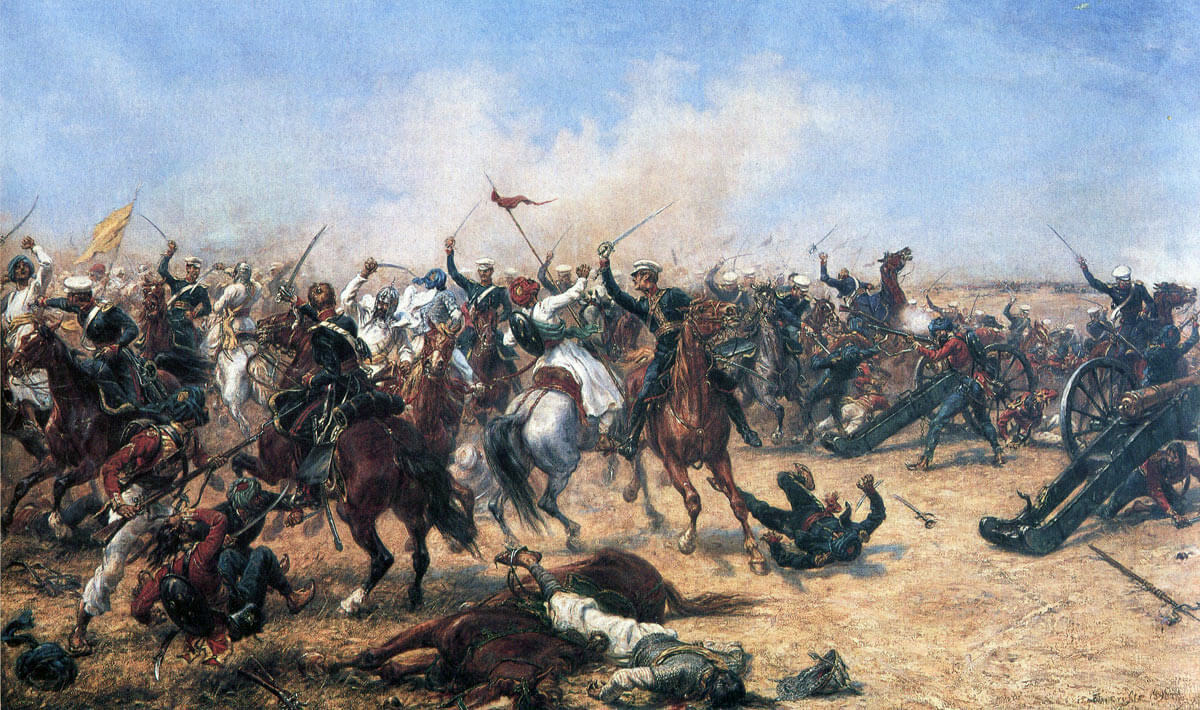
- The 3rd Light Dragoons charging during the battle
Date	18 December 1845
Location	Mudki, Punjab 30°47′N 74°53′E
Result	British victory (Note: "On the evening of December 18 some 10,000 Sikhs with 22 guns led by Lal Singh attack 11,000 British under British commander in chief in India General Sir Hugh Gough, who has 42 guns. Because much of the Battle of Mudki takes place at night, it becomes known as Midnight Mudki. Gough and the British are victorious.")

Belligerents
Sikh Empire	(United Kingdom of Great Britain and Ireland) British Empire: British East India Company

Commanders and leaders
Lal Singh (MIA)	(United Kingdom of Great Britain and Ireland) Sir Hugh Gough (United Kingdom of Great Britain and Ireland) Sir Henry Hardinge; George Broadfoot † (United Kingdom of Great Britain and Ireland) Robert Sale (DOW)

Strength
10,000; 22 guns	10,000–11,000; 42 guns

Casualties and losses
~300 killed	215 killed 657 wounded

The Battle of Mudki was fought on 18 December 1845, between the forces of the British East India Company and a part of the Sikh Khalsa Army, the army of the Sikh Empire. The British army were able to win the battle, despite suffering heavy casualties in the process.

== Background ==
The Sikh Empire of the Punjab had been held together by Maharajah Ranjit Singh. Ranjit Singh had maintained a policy of friendship with the British East India Company, who held territories adjoining the Punjab, while at the same time building up the Khalsa, to deter aggression. When he died in 1839, the Sikh empire fell into increasing disorder. As several successive rulers and ministers were deposed or murdered, the army expanded and became increasingly restive. To secure their hold on power, some of the leaders in the Punjab goaded their army into a war against the British.

The Governor General of the Bengal Presidency (and in effect, of all British-controlled India) was Sir Henry Hardinge. Receiving reports of the disorder in the Punjab, he wrote late in 1845, "... it is evident that the Rani and the Chiefs are for their own preservation, endeavouring to raise a storm which, when raised, they will be powerless to direct or allay." He increased the British military force on the borders of the Punjab, stationing a division of 7,000 at Ferozepore, and moving other troops to Ambala and Meerut.

The Sikh Khalsa Army began by crossing the Sutlej River into other territory held by the kingdom after provocation from the British, which the British deemed unacceptable on 11 December 1845.

== British advance ==
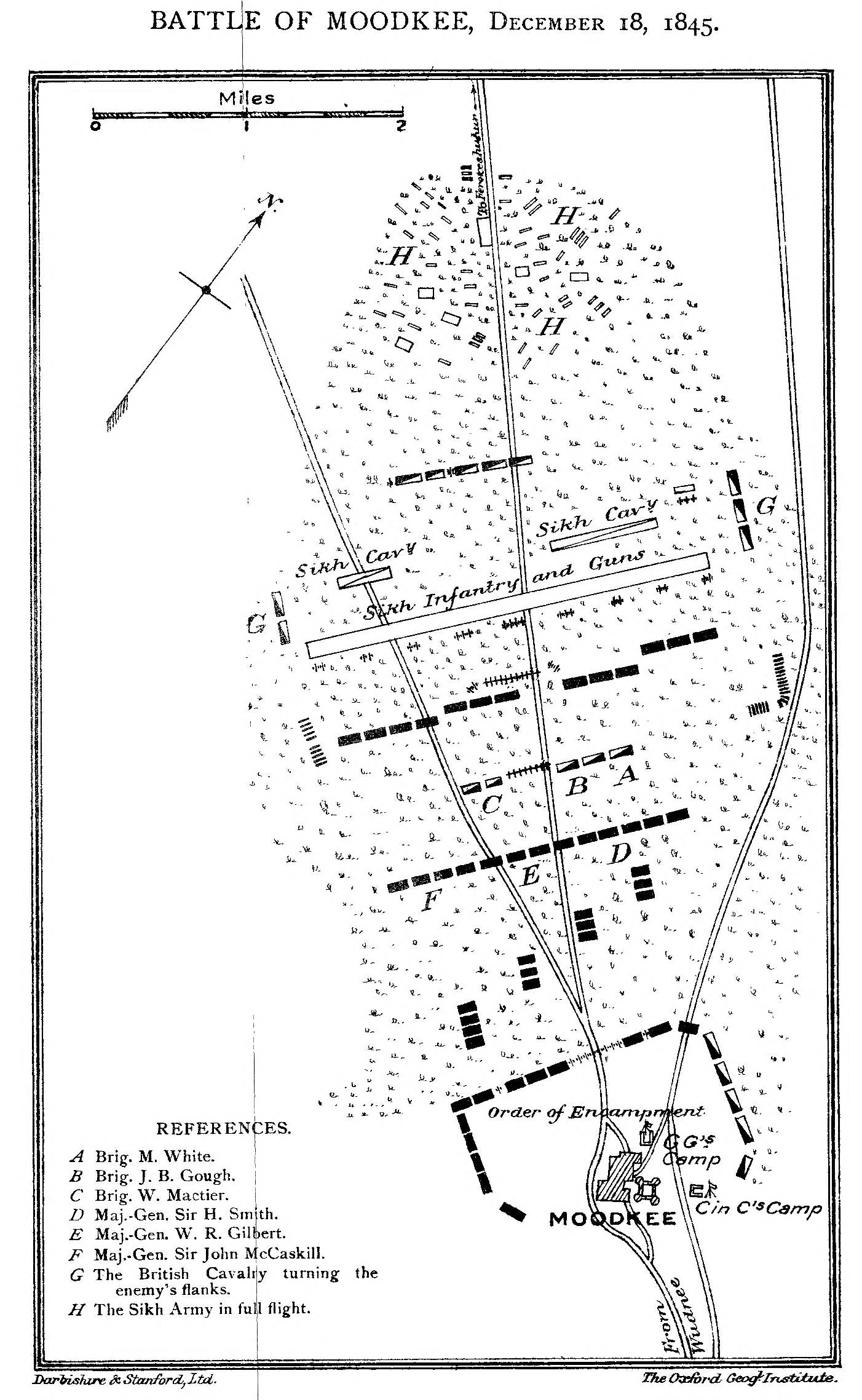
Map of the battle

The main British and Bengal Army, under its commander-in-chief, Sir Hugh Gough, began marching rapidly from its garrisons at Ambala and Meerut towards Ferozepur. Although the march took place in India's cold weather season, the troops were enveloped in choking dust clouds and water and food were short. Hardinge accompanied the army, waiving his right to command.

The British reached Mudki, 18 miles (29 km) from Ferozepur in the afternoon of 18 December. Having commandeered grain from the village, they began preparing their first proper meal for some days. An advance guard of the Sikh army, commanded by Lal Singh, Vizier of the Sikh Empire, spotted the British cooking fires and advanced. The terrain was a flat sandy plain, with occasional villages and patches of scrub.

== Battle ==
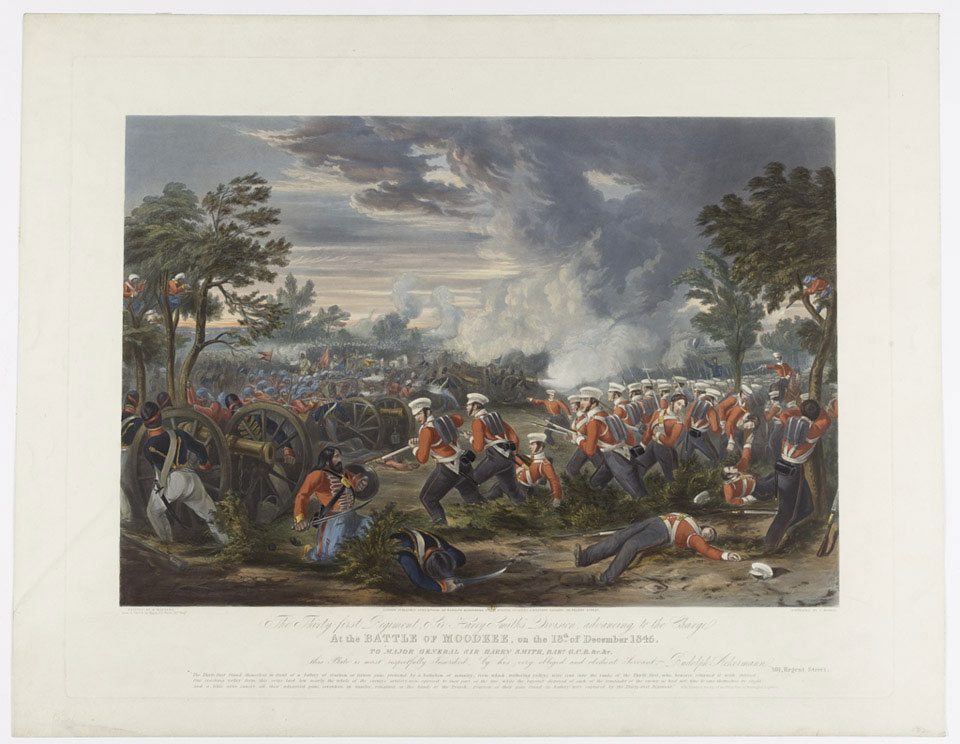
1849 illustration of the battle

In the late evening the Sikh guns opened fire. As 30 of Gough's light guns replied, the Sikh cavalry tried to outflank both flanks of Gough's army. Although the irregular cavalry, the Gorchurras, were individually very skilled (for example, being able to spear a tent-peg out of the ground at full gallop), they were comparatively ineffective against the disciplined British and Bengal units. A counter-charge by a British light dragoon regiment cut down many Sikh gunners, but in turn suffered heavy casualties from the Sikh infantry. Seventeen guns were captured, about a quarter of the Sikh artillery.

After the initial cavalry actions, the British and Bengal infantry advanced. In the gathering darkness and the clouds of smoke and dust, the advance quickly became disordered. Some Bengal infantry regiments caused casualties among the British units with confused fire. Although outnumbered five to one, the Sikh Fauj-i-Ain (regulars) resisted desperately, and their gunners kept firing volleys of grapeshot until they were overrun.

Eventually, after two hours of darkness, the last Sikhs were driven from the field. The British returned to their camp. The British army was unused to fighting or manoeuvering at night and the battle was nicknamed "Midnight Mudki". Casualties among British senior officers were heavy. Among those were two brigade commanders: "Fighting Bob" Sale, who was mortally wounded and died on 21 December, and John McCaskill.

== Results ==
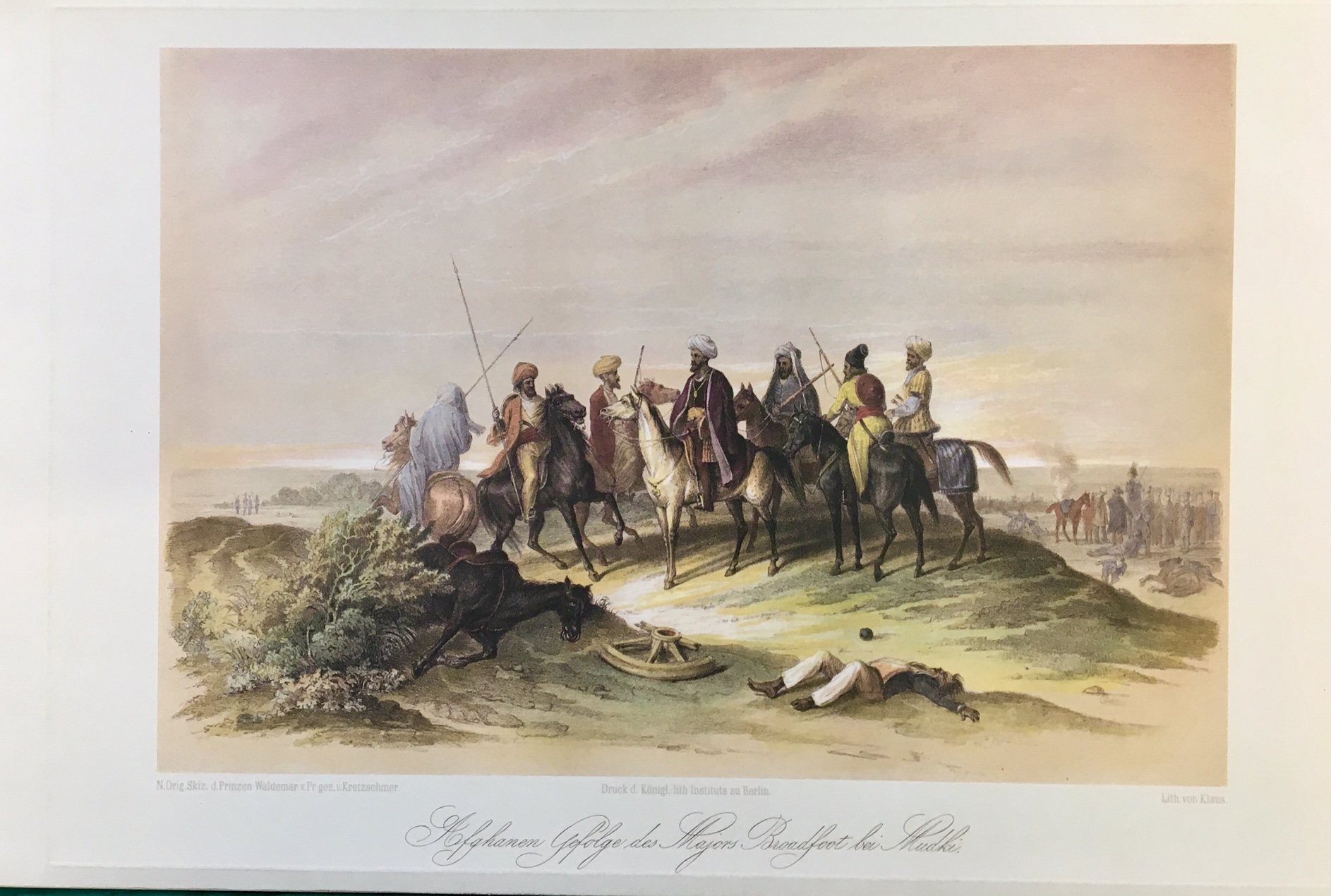
Afghan cavalry during the Battle of Mudki (18 December 1845) of the First Anglo-Sikh War (1845–46). Lithograph after an original sketch by Prince Waldemar of Prussia from 'In Memory of the Travels of Prince Waldemar of Prussia to India 1844-1846'.

By itself, the battle decided little. It did, however, confirm Hardinge in the belief that Gough was too bull-headed and unimaginative to command the army. The two officers would clash several times over strategy during the war.

On the Sikh side, it was alleged that Lal Singh had fled the battlefield early, although there was little scope for direction once the battle had been joined.

== Legacy ==
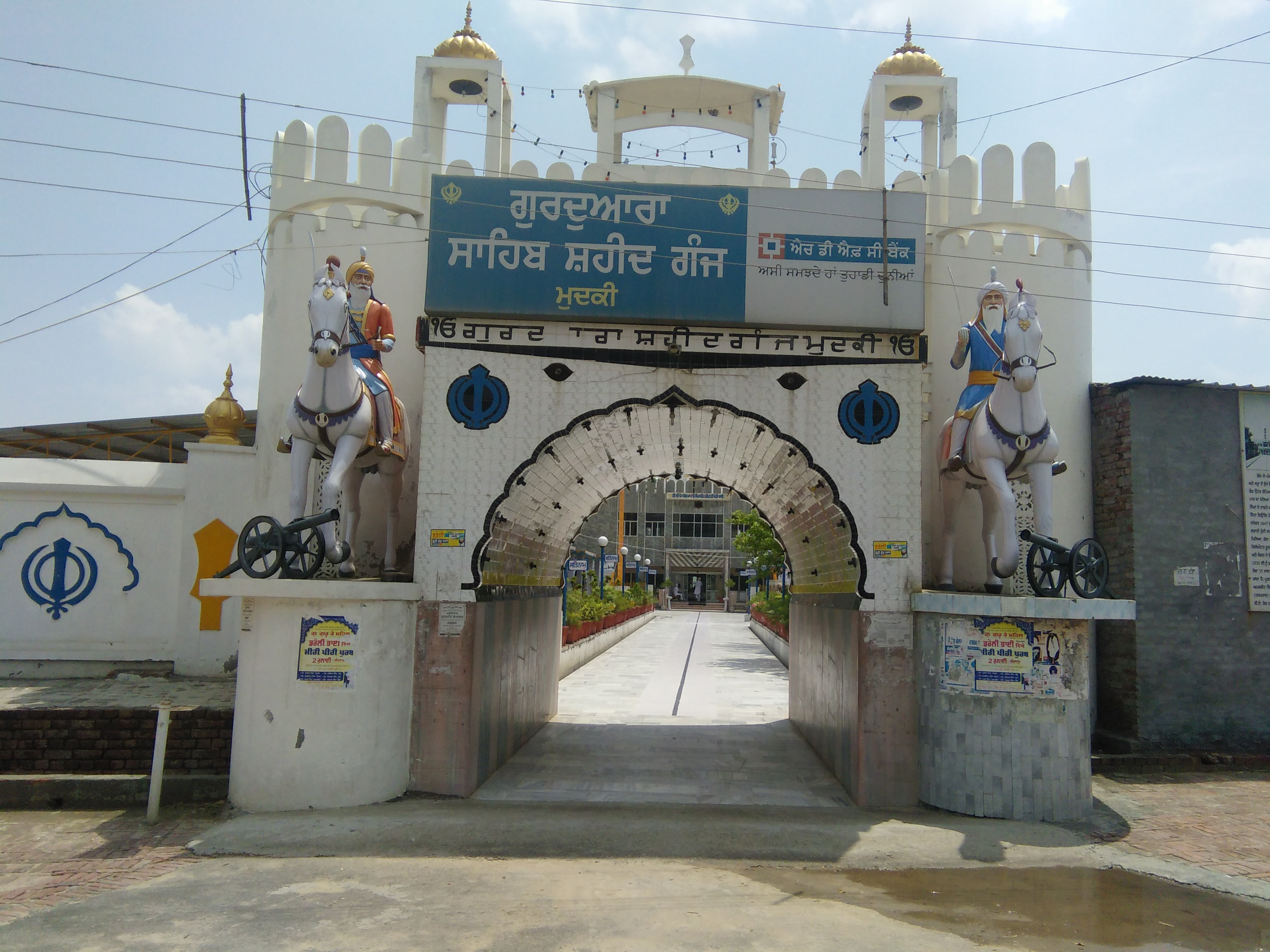
Gurdwara Shahid Ganj, Mudki

There is a gurdwara and monument dedicated to the battle at Mudki. The monument is in poor condition today.

== Order of battle ==
=== EIC ===
==== British regiments ====
- 3rd King's Own Light Dragoons
- 9th Foot
- 31st Foot
- 50th Foot
- 80th Foot

==== Indian regiments ====
- The Governor General’s Bodyguard
- 4th Bengal Light Cavalry
- 5th Bengal Light Cavalry
- Skinner’s Horse
- 8th Irregular Cavalry
- 9th Irregular Cavalry
- 2nd Bengal Native Infantry
- 16th Bengal Native Infantry
- 24th Bengal Native Infantry
- 26th Bengal Native Infantry
- 42nd Bengal Native Infantry
- 45th Bengal Native Infantry
- 47th Bengal Native Infantry
- 48th Bengal Native Infantry
- 73rd Bengal Native Infantry

== Sources ==
- Hernon, Ian (2003). Britain's forgotten wars. Sutton. ISBN 0-7509-3162-0.
- Perrett, Bryan (2007). British Military History for Dummies. John Wiley & Sons. ISBN 9780470061916.
- Tucker, Spencer C., ed. (2010). "December 18, 1845:South Asia: First Anglo-Sikh War(continued):Battle of Mudki". A Global Chronology of Conflict: From the Ancient World to the Modern Middle East. Vol. Three: 1775-1860. ABC-CLIO.
