= 5th Bengal Light Cavalry =

- Active: 1800-1857
- Country: India
- Allegiance: East India Company (1800-1857)
- Branch: Bengal Army (1800-1857)
- Type: Cavalry
- Size: Regiment
- Engagements: First Anglo-Afghan War; Indian Rebellion of 1857; First Anglo-Sikh War; Second Anglo-Sikh War

5th Bengal Light Cavalry (5th BLC) was a cavalry regiment of the Bengal Army of the East India Company.

== History ==
The 5th Bengal Light Cavalry was raised in 1800 as part of the Bengal Army of the East India Company. It participated in the occupation of Kabul in 1841 (battle honour) during the First Anglo-Afghan War. A part of the regiment was annihilated while serving as a rearguard during the disastrous 1842 retreat from Kabul. The remainder took part in the defence of Jellalabad under General Robert Sale (battle honour).

The regiment later served in First Anglo-Sikh War (1845-46) and the Second Anglo-Sikh War (1848-49).

=== Battle honours ===
With 11 battle honors, the 5th Bengal Light Cavalry was the most highly decorated of any of the Light Cavalry regiments of the Bengal Army.

- Jellalabad (with mural crown)
- Cabool
- Maharajpore
- Punniar
- Moodkee
- Ferozeshuhur
- Aliwal
- Sobraon
- Punjaub
- Chillianwallah
- Goojerat

=== Uniform ===
The 5th BLC wore the standard French grey (a shade of grey-tinged light blue) uniform of the regular Bengal cavalry regiments. The 5th however had the distinction of black facings, while the remaining BLC regiments all had orange.

A high turban was worn by the sowars (Indian troopers) of the regiment from 1825 until it was replaced by a peakless shako. At the time of the 1857 Rebellion the Indian troopers were wearing round forage caps, with white covers in hot weather.

=== Disbandment ===
In the course of the Indian Rebellion of 1857 all the eight Bengal Light Cavalry regiments were lost to mutiny or disbandment. The 5th BLC, numbering at the time 500 sowars, was stationed at Peshwar when the rebellion broke out. Together with three regiments of Bengal Native Infantry, the 5th BLC were disarmed and disbanded on 15 May 1857 on suspicion that they were no longer to be trusted. The sowers laid down their weapons without resistance. Their British officers had retained confidence in the loyalty of their men and some threw their own swords on the pile of weapons.
