= Henry Martens =

English painter

Henry Martens (1790, London – 1868, London) was an English military illustrator and artist. He worked mainly in water-color although a few oil paintings do exist. He was the eldest of three sons of Christoph Heinrich (anglice Christopher Henry) Martens and his wife Rebecca, the others being John William and Conrad.

== Works ==
Martens exhibited pictures at various galleries including the British Institution and particularly at the Society of British Artists. Between 1828 and 1842, he showed no fewer than 34 water-colors at the latter, the majority depicting military scenes such as The Skirmish at Drumclog (1833–34), Out-post duty - English Hussars (1836), Charles I at the Battle of Naseby (1839) and Cavalry engagement at Benevente during Sir John Moore's Retreat (1842).

He produced work ready for etching from drawings supplied by Captain George Rodney Mundy for publication in his 1848 book, Narrative of Events in Borneo and the Celebes..., originals of which are now in Australia.

He created works for the firm of Rudolf Ackermann who ran the Eclipse Sporting Gallery at 191 Regent Street. The majority of these depicted military uniforms and battle scenes, particularly images of the Sikh Wars and the Kaffir Wars. The set of Sikh War lithographs published by Ackermann's in 1847 is particularly notable. Martens supplied water-color drawings which were then lithographed by John Harris. Included in the collection were prints of the Battle of Ferozeshah, the Battle of Aliwal, and the Battle of Sobraon, and Martens based his pictures on sketches supplied by Major George Francis White, an officer of the 31st Regiment who had served in the campaign.

In 1852, Ackermann's published a set of large colored lithographs illustrating the Kaffir War. Once again, Martens created the master painting for each plate which was engraved by Harris, but in this case, the source was Captain George Jackson Carey of the Cape Mounted Rifles who provided the artist with sketches; another sketch was supplied by Thomas Baines. While these lithographs are stirring renditions of colonial warfare, it is doubtful if Martens ever experiences fighting himself.

Martens is perhaps best known for his numerous illustrations of contemporary uniforms of the British and Indian Army. His most famous work, Costumes of the British Army containing 44 coloured aquatint plates, engraved once again by Harris, was published by Ackermann's between 1849 and 1853. Another set was titled The Costumes of the Indian Army, and both cost 5 shillings a set.

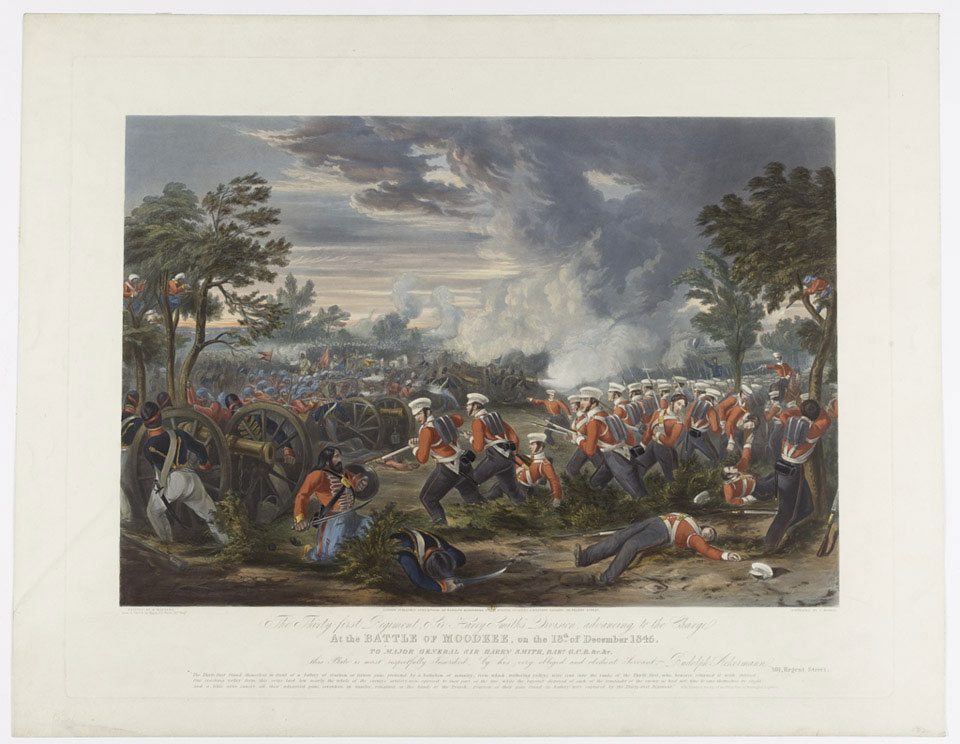
"Battle of Mudki, 1845."

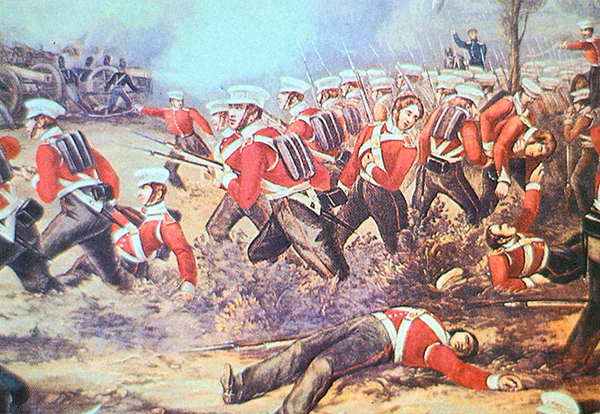
Detail from below.

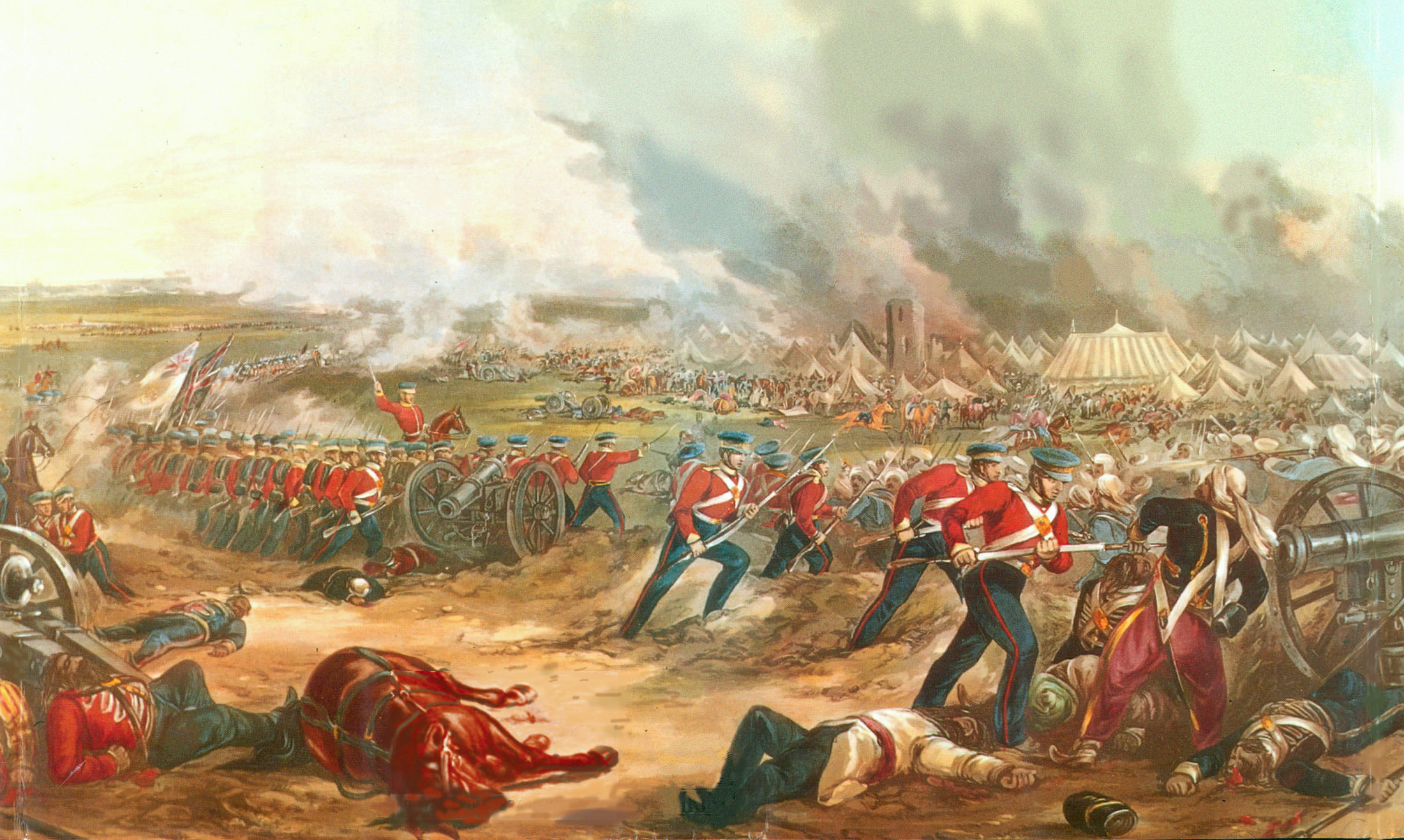
"The 62nd Regiment on the second day of Ferozeshah."

== Oil paintings ==
- Vittoria (The Light Dragoons)
- Charge of the 4th Dragoons at the Battle of Salamanca (Queen's Royal Hussars)
- The 7th Hussars charging the French Cavalry at Waterloo (Queen's Royal Hussars)
- The Battle of Aliwal, 28 January 1846 (Queen's Royal Lancers)
- Ferozeshah, 22 December 1845 (Private Collection)
- The Charge of the 14th Light Dragoons at Ramnuggar led by Col. Havelock (Queen's Royal Hussars)
- The Siege of Mooltan, 1849 (India Office Library and Records)
- Cape Mounted Rifles, Kaffir War, 1850 (The Light Infantry)
- Orange River, December 1852 (Private Collection)
