= 4th Bengal European Cavalry =

The 4th Bengal European Cavalry was a cavalry regiment of the British East India Company, created in 1858 and disbanded in 1859.

The regiment was originally raised in Bengal by the East India Company in 1858 as the 4th Bengal European Light Cavalry, for service in the Indian Mutiny; the "European" in the name indicated that the soldiers were white, and not Indian sowars.

== White mutiny ==
After the passage of the Government of India Act 1858, the regiment was transferred from the East India Company to "local service" under the British crown. This was resented by the men who felt that their "rights had been infringed." When it was proposed that the "European" units be transferred into the British Army there was a period of considerable unrest, known as the "White mutiny". The mutiny successfully achieved concessions from the British Government, allowing soldiers to opt for free discharges and passage home as an alternative to transferring into the British Army, and many soldiers took advantage of the scheme.

== See also ==
- Bengal Army
- White mutiny
