= John William Sidney Smith =

British Army officer

General John William Sidney Smith CB
- Born: 1815
- Died: 11 April 1900 (aged 84–85); Thirlmere, Leamington
- Military career
- Allegiance: United Kingdom
- Branch: British Army
- Service years: 1832–1881
- Rank: General
- Conflicts: Crimean War
- Awards: Order of the Bath

General John William Sidney Smith CB (1815 – 11 April 1900) was a senior British Army officer.

== Military career ==
Smith joined the British Army in 1832. He was in command of a detachment of the 38th (1st Staffordshire) Regiment of Foot which occupied San Juan de Nicaragua in 1848, when the town was ceded to the Mosquito Kingdom, a protectorate of the British. The regiment was dispatched to the Crimea for service in the Crimean War in April 1854, and he took part in the Battle of the Alma in September 1854, Battle of Inkerman in November 1854 and the siege of Sevastopol in winter 1854. For his service in this war he was mentioned in despatches, appointed a Companion of the Order of the Bath (CB), received the Crimea Medal with three clasps, and the French Legion d'honeur (knight) and the Ottoman Order of the Medjidie (4th class).

He was promoted to major-general in 1868, then to lieutenant-general and received the honorary rank of general on 1 July 1881.

General Smith was Honorary Colonel of the Gloucestershire Regiment from 1883 to 1887, and then Honorary Colonel of the South Staffordshire Regiment from 1887 until his death in 1900.

He died at his residence, Thirlmere, Leamington on 11 April 1900.

Military offices
| Preceded by Lieut.-General Sir Thomas Steele | Colonel of the Gloucestershire Regiment; 1883–1887 | Succeeded by |
| Preceded by Lieut.-General Charles Elmhirst (1st Batt); General St George Foley (2nd Batt) | Colonel of the South Staffordshire Regiment; 1887–1900 | Succeeded by Lieut.-General Sir George Samuel Young |
