= 44th Airborne Division (India) =

Airborne division of the Indian Army during World War II

44th Indian Airborne Division
- Unit Insgina
- Active: 1944–1947
- Country: British India
- Allegiance: British Empire
- Branch: British Indian Army
- Type: Airborne forces
- Size: Division
- Engagements: World War II: Battle of Elephant Point

Commanders
- Notable commanders: Ernest Edward Down

Insignia
- Identification symbol: Winged Pegasus on a Scarlet background with India underneath

The 44th Indian Airborne Division was an airborne forces division of the Indian Army during World War II, created in 1944. It provided a parachute battalion for one minor airborne operation, but the war ended before the complete formation could take part. (However, most of its subordinate formations and units had already seen action before the division had been formed).

== History ==
=== Creation ===
The division's creation was a protracted affair. The division was first converted from the 9th Airborne Division (itself built around the core of the disbanded 44th Indian Armoured Division), at Secunderabad in India, on 15 April 1944.

Within a fortnight, the division HQ and such supporting units as had been allocated were used to form the 21st Indian Infantry Division, as an emergency measure during the Japanese invasion of India (which was codenamed Operation U-Go, and which resulted in the battles of Imphal and Kohima). By 15 July, the crisis was clearly over, and the airborne division's formation was resumed.

=== Formation ===
On 15 September 1944, the existing 50th Indian Parachute Brigade was allocated to the division. Later in the year, it was decreed that the Chindit formations were to be broken up and some of them were to be converted to airborne formations. The 14th British Airlanding Brigade became part of the division on 1 November 1944, and the Indian 77th Indian Parachute Brigade on 1 March 1945.

The conversion of 77th Brigade to a parachute formation was accompanied by the creation of the Indian Parachute Regiment, which absorbed the existing Indian and Gurkha parachute battalions, and the formation of two British battalions of the Parachute Regiment around the cadre of troops that had already fought as Glider infantry during the Chindit campaign; 15th (King's) Battalion, Parachute Regiment from 1st Battalion King's Regiment (Liverpool), and 16th (Staffords) Battalion, Parachute Regiment from 1st Battalion South Staffordshire Regiment.

=== Operation Dracula ===
The division was still in the midst of formation, reorganisation and training when it was called upon to provide a parachute force to take part in Operation Dracula. This was an amphibious operation intended to capture Rangoon, the capital and principal port of Burma, which was reinstated at short notice after being earlier cancelled.

A composite Gurkha parachute battalion was formed from the two Gurkha battalions of the Indian Parachute Regiment, and landed behind Japanese coastal defences at the mouth of the Rangoon river on 1 May 1945. During the Battle of Elephant Point, they cleared Japanese rearguards from the defences, but the main Japanese garrison had evacuated Rangoon several days previously. The subsequent landings from the sea were unopposed.

=== Later Operations ===
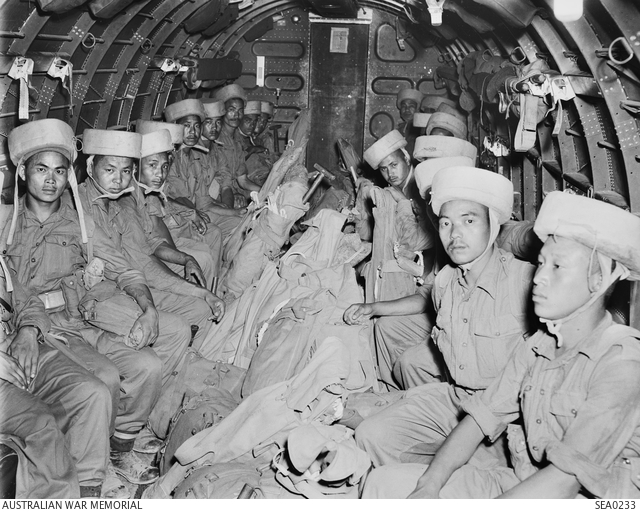
Paratroops of the 44th Indian Airborne Division waiting to jump over Rangoon, Burma, 1945.

The division was preparing to take part in the projected invasions of Malaya and Singapore when the war ended unexpectedly. The division provided small airborne parties that landed in Japanese-occupied territories ahead of the main Allied forces, locating camps containing Allied prisoners of war and interned civilians, and delivering emergency relief supplies. The 44 Indian Airborne Division was then renamed the 2nd Indian Airborne Division in November 1945 and was retained until the Partition of India, when it was disbanded on 14/15 August 1947. One parachute brigade and some divisional units went to Pakistan, the other two brigades and the remaining units went to India.

== Order of Battle, as of 1 May 1945 ==
General Officer Commanding - Major General Earnest Edward Down
Commander, Royal Artillery - Brigadier Reginald John Kirton

14th British Airlanding Brigade - Brigadier Francis William Gibb

2nd Battalion, Black Watch (Royal Highland Regiment)
4th Battalion, 6th Rajputana Rifles
6th Battalion, 16th Punjab Regiment

50th Indian Parachute Brigade - Brigadier Edward Galbraith Woods

16th (Staffords) Battalion, Parachute Regiment
1st Battalion, Indian Parachute Regiment
3rd Battalion, Indian Parachute Regiment

77th Indian Parachute Brigade - Brigadier Claude John Wilkinson

15th (King's) Battalion, Parachute Regiment
2nd Battalion, Indian Parachute Regiment
4th Battalion, Indian Parachute Regiment

Divisional Units

123rd (West Riding) Field Regiment, Royal Artillery
159th Field Regiment, Royal Artillery
23rd Light Anti-Aircraft / Anti-Tank Regiment, Royal Artillery
