= USS LST-347 =

LST-1-class landing ship tank

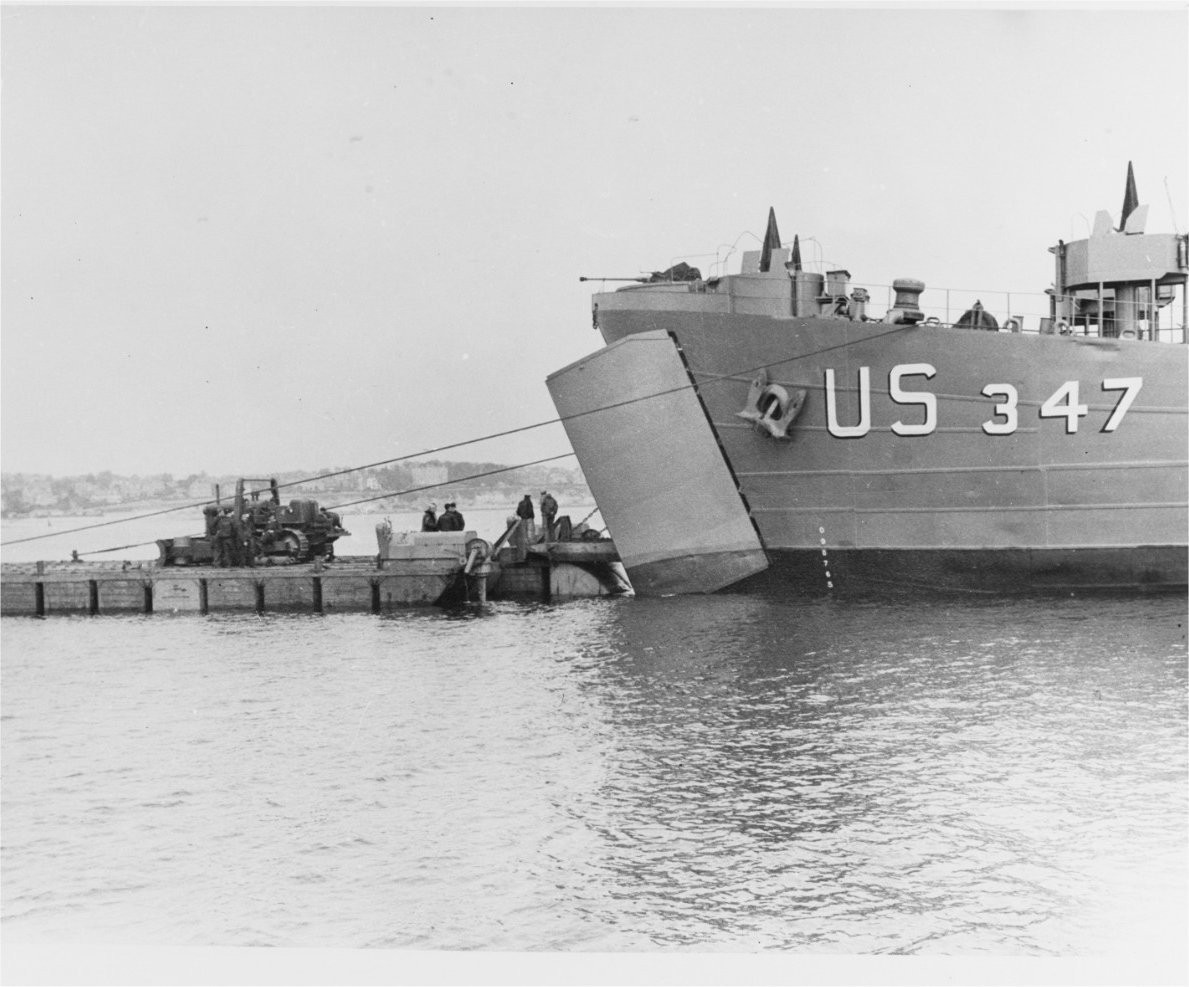
- USS LST-347 on 6 June 1944

History

United States
- Name: LST-347
- Builder: Norfolk Navy Yard, Portsmouth
- Laid down: 10 November 1942
- Launched: 7 February 1943
- Sponsored by: Mrs. J. M. Farrin
- Commissioned: 7 February 1943
- Decommissioned: 19 December 1944
- Stricken: 28 April 1949
- Identification: Callsign: NZQX
- Honors and awards: See Awards
- Fate: Transferred to Royal Navy, 19 December 1944

History

United Kingdom
- Name: LST-347
- Commissioned: 19 December 1944
- Decommissioned: 23 January 1946
- Fate: Transferred to France, 23 January 1948

History

France
- Name: Vire
- Namesake: Vire
- Commissioned: 23 January 1948
- Decommissioned: January 1957
- Reclassified: L9003
- Identification: Pennant number: LST-347
- Fate: Scrapped, 1957

General characteristics
- Class & type: LST-1-class tank landing ship
- Displacement: 4,080 long tons (4,145 t) full load; 2,160 long tons (2,190 t) landing
- Length: 328 ft (100 m) oa
- Beam: 50 ft (15 m)
- Draft: Full load: 8 ft 2 in (2.49 m) forward; 14 ft 1 in (4.29 m) aft; Landing at 2,160 t: 3 ft 11 in (1.19 m) forward; 9 ft 10 in (3.00 m) aft
- Installed power: 2 × 900 hp (670 kW) Electro-Motive Diesel 12-567A diesel engines; 1,700 shp (1,300 kW)
- Propulsion: 1 × Falk main reduction gears; 2 × Propellers
- Speed: 12 kn (22 km/h; 14 mph)
- Range: 24,000 nmi (44,000 km; 28,000 mi) at 9 kn (17 km/h; 10 mph) while displacing 3,960 long tons (4,024 t)
- Boats & landing craft carried: 2 or 6 x LCVPs
- Capacity: 2,100 tons oceangoing maximum; 350 tons main deckload
- Troops: 16 officers, 147 enlisted men
- Complement: 13 officers, 104 enlisted men
- Armament: Varied, ultimate armament; 2 × twin 40 mm (1.57 in) Bofors guns; 4 × single 40 mm Bofors guns; 12 × 20 mm (0.79 in) Oerlikon cannons

USS LST-347 was a LST-1-class tank landing ship in the United States Navy during World War II. She was later sold to France as Vire (L9003).

== Construction and career ==
LST-347 was laid down on 10 November 1942 at Norfolk Navy Yard, Portsmouth, Virginia. Launched on 7 February 1943 and commissioned on 7 February 1943.

=== Service in the United States ===
During World War II, LST-347 was assigned to the Europe-Africa-Middle East theater. She took part in the Invasion of Sicilian from 9 to 15 July 1943 and the Salerno landings from 9 to 21 September 1943.

She participated in the Invasion of Normandy from 6 to 25 June 1944.

LST-347 was decommissioned on 19 December 1944 and transferred to the Royal Navy.

She was struck from the Navy Register on 28 April 1949.

=== Service in the United Kingdom ===
HMS LST-347 was commissioned on 18 December 1944 and was part of W Task Force which participated in the recapture of Rangoon, before proceeding to the eventual invasion of Malaya at Morib and Port Swettenham, and to Singapore and Bangkok doing relief work repatriating ex P.O.W.s of the Japanese.

She was paid off at Singapore on 23 January 1946 and leased to France on 23 January 1948.

=== Service in France ===
She was transferred to the French Navy and commissioned on 23 January 1948 with the same name LST-347.

In 1950, she was given the name Vire (LST-347).

Liamone took part in the First Indochina War between 19 December 1946 to 1 August 1954.

She was later redesignated as L9003 in the later years of her service in the 1950s.

The ship was out of service and sold for scrap in early 1957.

== Awards ==
LST-347 have earned the following awards:

- American Campaign Medal
- Europe-Africa-Middle East Campaign Medal (3 battle stars)
- World War II Victory Medal

== Sources ==
- United States. Dept. of the Treasury (1962). Treasury Decisions Under the Customs, Internal Revenue, Industrial Alcohol, Narcotic and Other Laws, Volume 97. U.S. Government Printing Office.
- Moore, Capt. John (1984). Jane's Fighting Ships 1984-85. Jane's Information Group. ISBN 978-0710607959.
- Saunders, Stephen (2009). Jane's Fighting Ships 2009-2010. Jane's Information Group. ISBN 978-0710628886.
- Fairplay International Shipping Journal Volume 222. United Kingdom: Fairplay Publishing Limited. 1967.
