= South Staffordshire Regiment =

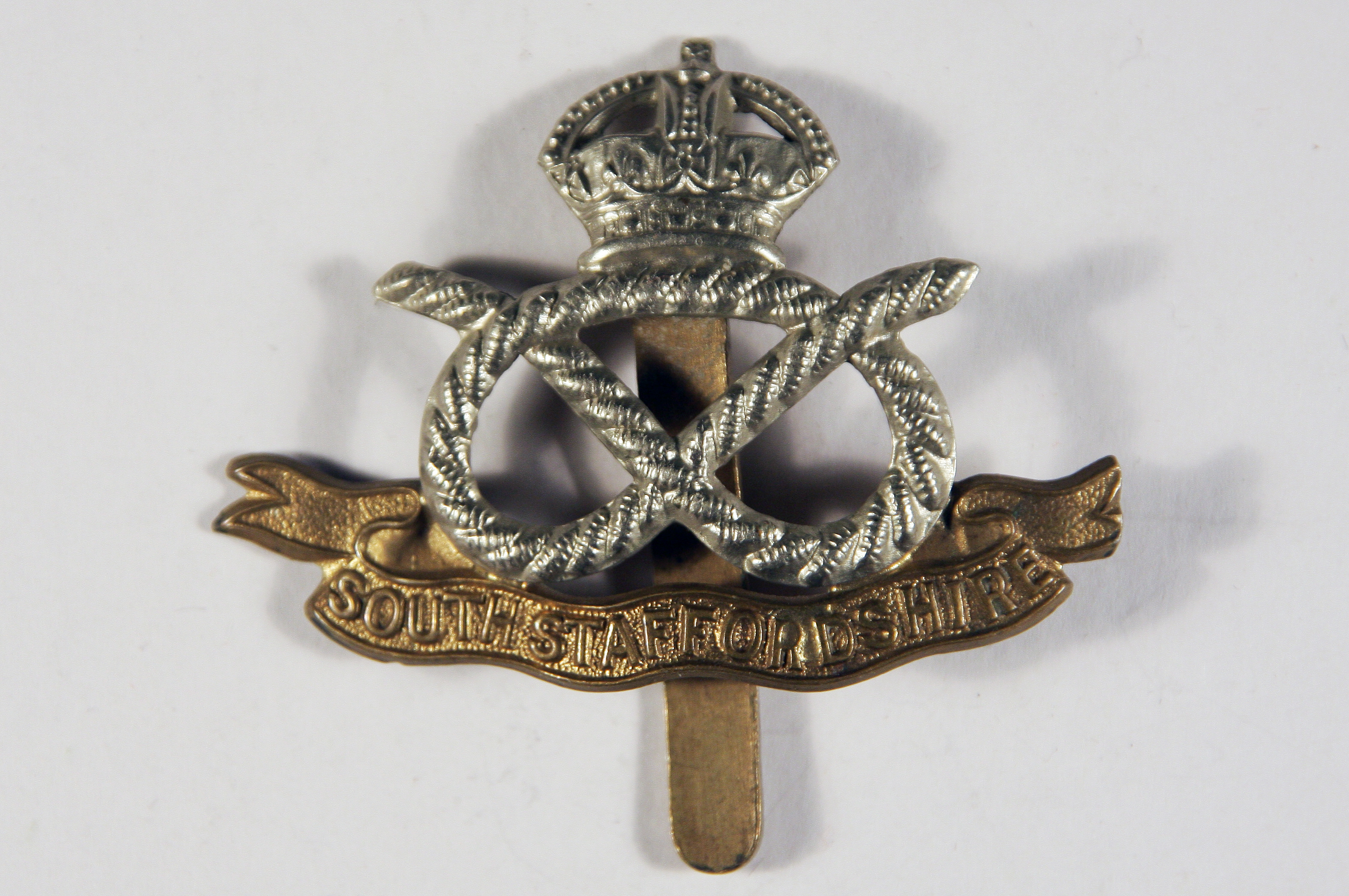
- Cap badge of the South Staffordshire Regiment.
- Active: 1881–1959
- Country: United Kingdom
- Branch: British Army
- Type: Infantry
- Role: Line infantry
- Size: 2 Regular battalions 2 Militia and Special Reserve battalions 2–3 Territorial and Volunteer battalions Up to 12 Hostilities-only battalions
- Part of: Mercian Brigade (1948–59)
- Garrison/HQ: Whittington Barracks, Lichfield
- Nicknames: 1 Bn: The Pump and Tortoise; 2 Bn: The Staffordshire Knots
- Colors: Green, red and gold
- March: Come, Lasses and Lads
- Mascot: Staffordshire Bull Terrier
- Anniversaries: Arnhem, 17 Sep; Ferozeshah, 21 Dec

The South Staffordshire Regiment was a line infantry regiment of the British Army in existence for only 68 years. The regiment was created in 1881 under the Childers Reforms by the amalgamation of the 38th (1st Staffordshire) Regiment of Foot and the 80th (Staffordshire Volunteers) Regiment of Foot. The regiment saw service in the Second Boer War, World War I and World War II.

Reduced to a single Regular Army battalion after the Second World War, the regiment was amalgamated, in 1959, with the North Staffordshire Regiment (Prince of Wales's) to form the Staffordshire Regiment (Prince of Wales's) which was later, in 2007, amalgamated with the Cheshire Regiment and the Worcestershire and Sherwood Foresters Regiment to form the Mercian Regiment.

== History ==
=== Formation and antecedents ===
The regiment was formed as part of the Childers Reforms on 1 July 1881 by the amalgamation of the 38th and 80th regiments of foot, which became the regular 1st and 2nd battalions of the South Staffordshire Regiment. Militia and Rifle Volunteers of south Staffordshire were also incorporated in the new regiment. The battalions formed in 1881 were as follows:

- 1st Battalion: the 38th (1st Staffordshire) Regiment of Foot, raised in Lichfield in 1705 as Colonel Luke Lillingstone's Regiment, numbered as the 38th in 1751, and received the subsidiary title of 1st Staffordshire in 1782.
- 2nd Battalion: the 80th (Staffordshire Volunteers) Regiment of Foot, raised in 1793 by Lord William Henry Paget from members of the Staffordshire Militia.
- 3rd (Militia) Battalion: 1st Battalion, King's Own (1st Staffordshire) Militia
- 4th (Militia) Battalion: 2nd Battalion, King's Own (1st Staffordshire) Militia
- 1st Volunteer Battalion: 1st Staffordshire Rifle Volunteer Corps
- 2nd Volunteer Battalion: 3rd Staffordshire Rifle Volunteer Corps
- 3rd Volunteer Battalion: 4th Staffordshire Rifle Volunteer Corps

The reserve battalions of the regiment were reorganised in 1908 by the Territorial and Reserve Forces Act 1907, with the two militia battalions becoming the 3rd (Reserve) and 4th (Extra Reserve) battalions of the Special Reserve. The three Volunteer Battalions transferred to the Territorial Force (TF); the 1st Volunteer Battalion formed the 1st North Midland Field Company, Royal Engineers, a few of the men joining with the 2nd Volunteer Battalion to form the 5th Battalion (TF) at Whittimere Street in Walsall, while the 3rd Volunteer Battalion formed the 6th Battalion (TF) at Stafford Street in Wolverhampton.

=== Prior to the First World War ===
The 1st Battalion (the former 38th) was sent to Egypt in 1882 as part of the British invasion of the country. On landing in Alexandria, it carried its colours through the city – this was the last occasion on which a British Army unit carried colours on active service. In 1885, the battalion travelled up the River Nile to Sudan in an unsuccessful attempt to lift the Siege of Khartoum. The battalion was subsequently involved in the defeat of Arab forces at Kirbekan.

The 1st Battalion then entered a long period of garrison duty in Gibraltar, Egypt, England and Ireland. They arrived home from Gibraltar in early February 1900. With the outbreak of the Second Boer War the previous year, the regiment was ordered to South Africa, arriving as part of the 8th Division in 1900. The battalion was mostly involved in minor skirmishes with the Boers, but suffered casualties due to disease and poor nutrition.

In 1904, the 1st South Staffords returned to the United Kingdom, being stationed in Ireland and England until 1911, when it moved to Gibraltar. While in Gibraltar, new colours were presented to the battalion by King George V on 31 January 1912. The battalion returned to South Africa in 1913.

The 2nd Battalion (the former 80th) was stationed in British India in 1881, soon moving to Tralee in Ireland, where it was involved in actions against Irish nationalists. It returned to England in 1883. It was then posted to The Curragh from 1889 to 1891, before travelling to Egypt, via Aldershot, in 1893. The battalion subsequently served in southern India and Burma until 1907, when it started a four-year posting in Pretoria, South Africa. The battalion returned to England in 1911.

The 3rd, Militia battalion, was embodied in May 1900, and disembodied in December the same year. They were again embodied in May 1901, and the following month 500 men embarked for service in South Africa during the Second Boer War. The battalion returned in July 1902.

The 4th, Militia battalion, was embodied in December 1899, and 650 men embarked in February 1900 for service in South Africa during the Second Boer War. They returned in August 1901, when they disembodied.

=== First World War ===
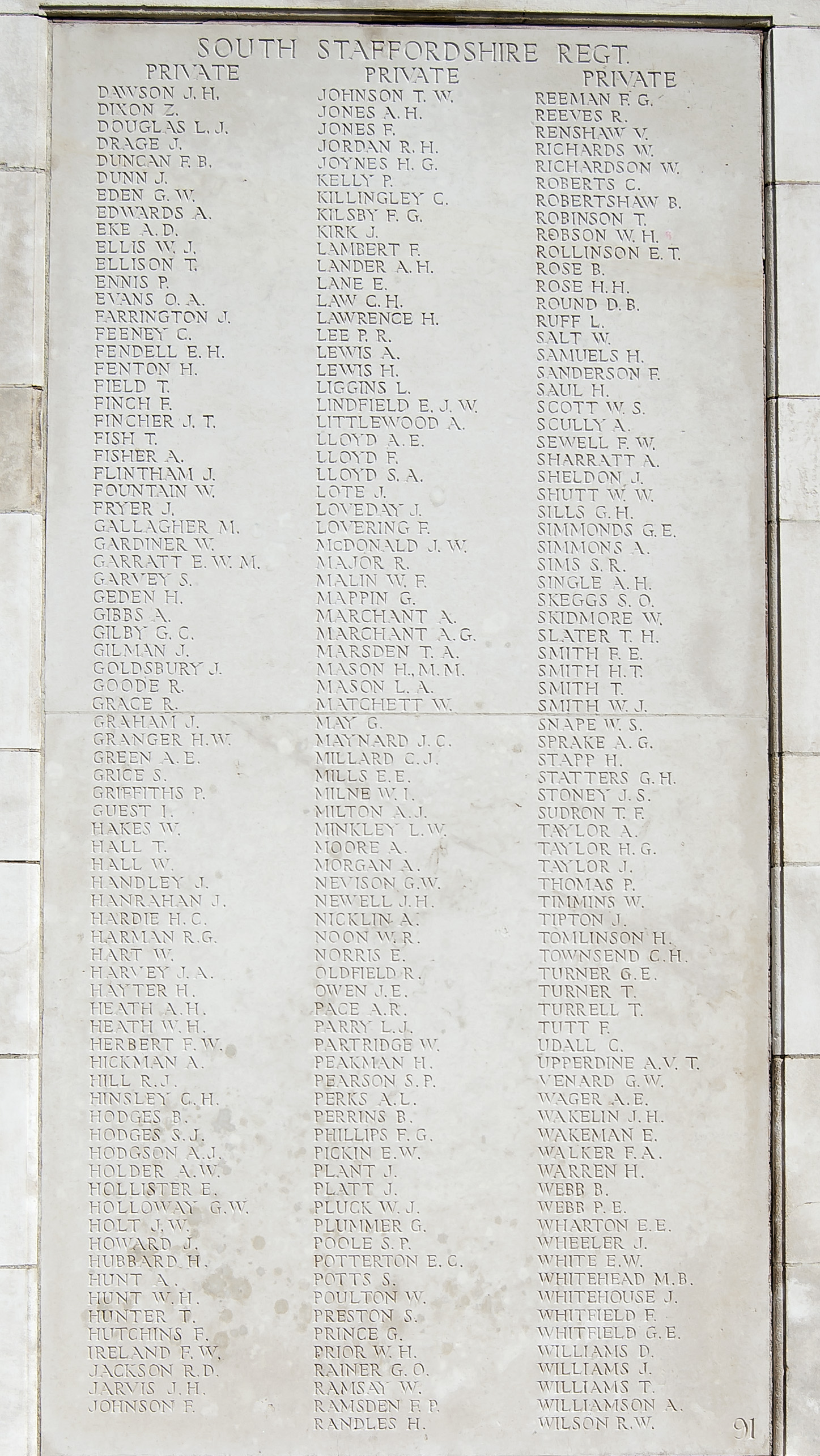
List of some casualties from the Regiment during the First World War at Tyne Cot

==== Regular Army ====
The 1st Battalion landed at Zeebrugge as part of the 22nd Brigade in 7th Division in October 1914 for service on the Western Front and then moved to Italy in November 1917. The 2nd Battalion landed at Le Havre as part of the 6th Brigade in the 2nd Division in August 1914 also for service on the Western Front.

==== Special Reserve ====
Both the 3rd and 4th Battalions remained in the UK training reinforcement drafts for the regular battalions. However, in October 1917 the 4th (Extra Reserve) Battalion landed at Le Havre to join 7th Brigade in 25th Division for service on the Western Front in the last year of the war.

==== Territorial Force ====
Both the 1/5th Battalion and 1/6th battalions landed at Le Havre as part of the Staffordshire Brigade in the North Midland Division in March 1915 for service on the Western Front before transferring to Egypt in January 1916 and then returning to France in February 1916. They crossed the St Quentin Canal to break through the strongest sector of the Hindenburg Line during the Battle of St. Quentin Canal in September 1918. Both the 2/5th and 2/6th battalions, part of the 176th (2/1st Staffordshire) Brigade of 59th (2nd North Midland) Division, were involved in hostilities in Dublin during the 1916 Easter Rising. Soldiers from the regiment murdered 16 unarmed men and boys in the infamous North King Street Massacre. They then landed at Le Havre in February 1917 for service on the Western Front.

==== New Armies ====
The 7th (Service) Battalion landed at Suvla Bay as part of the part of 33rd Brigade in the 11th (Northern) Division in August 1915. The 7th (Service) Battalion moved off to the south to dig a system of flanking trenches while other units forward from B beach, Suvla Bay. It was evacuated from Gallipoli in December 1915 and moved to Egypt before landing in France in July 1916 for service on the Western Front. The 8th (Service) Battalion landed at Boulogne-sur-Mer as part of the 51st Brigade in 17th (Northern) Division in July 1915 also for service on the Western Front. The 9th (Service) Battalion (Pioneers) landed at Boulogne-sur-Mer as pioneer battalion for the 23rd Division in August 1915 also for service on the Western Front before transferring to Italy in November 1917.

=== Inter-war period ===
The 1st Battalion served in Singapore and Burma before being deployed to India in 1925 and to Sudan in 1927. The battalion returned to England in 1929.

After occupying the Rhineland with II Corps, the 2nd Battalion returned to England in May 1919. The 2nd Battalion moved to Cork in 1920, and was involved in the Irish War of Independence. It returned to England in 1923, where it remained until 1929 when it was posted to Palestine. It then moved to India in 1932.

The 3rd and 4th (Special Reserve) battalions were placed in "suspended animation" in 1921, eventually being disbanded in 1953. The Territorial Force was reconstituted as the Territorial Army in 1920, and the 5th and 6th battalions were reformed. In 1939, the size of the Territorial Army was doubled, with duplicate 2/6th and 7th battalions being formed.

In 1935, the South Staffordshire Regiment was granted the distinction of a badge backing of buff-coloured Brown Holland material. This commemorated the 57 years of continuous service by the 38th Foot in the West Indies from 1707 to 1764, and recalled the fact that their uniforms became so threadbare during their service in the tropics that they had to be repaired with pieces of sacking.

=== Second World War ===
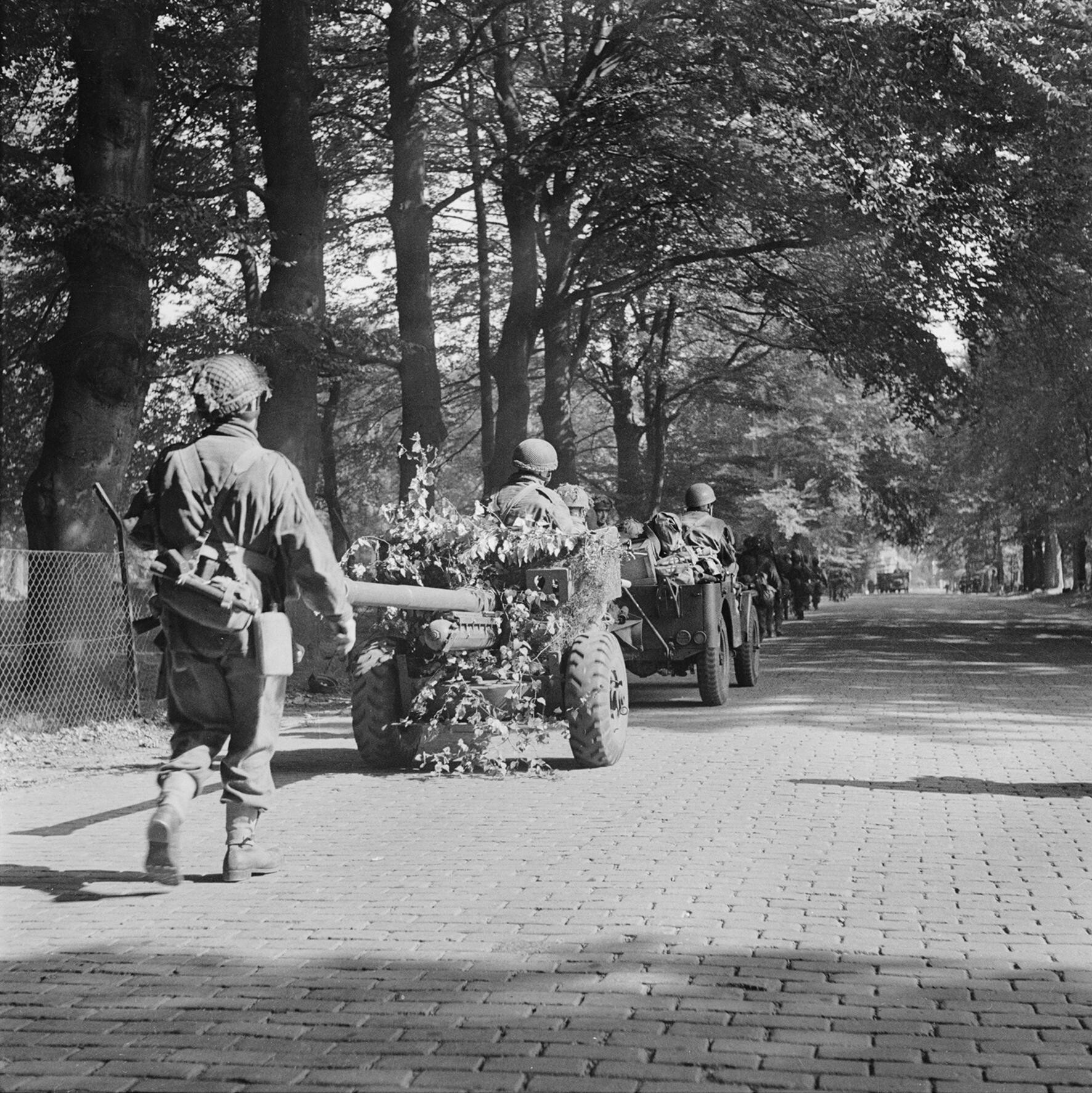
Soldiers of the 2nd Battalion, South Staffordshire Regiment, part of 1st Airlanding Brigade of 1st Airborne Division, marching on a road between Oosterbeek and Arnhem. 19 September 1944

==== Regular Army battalions ====
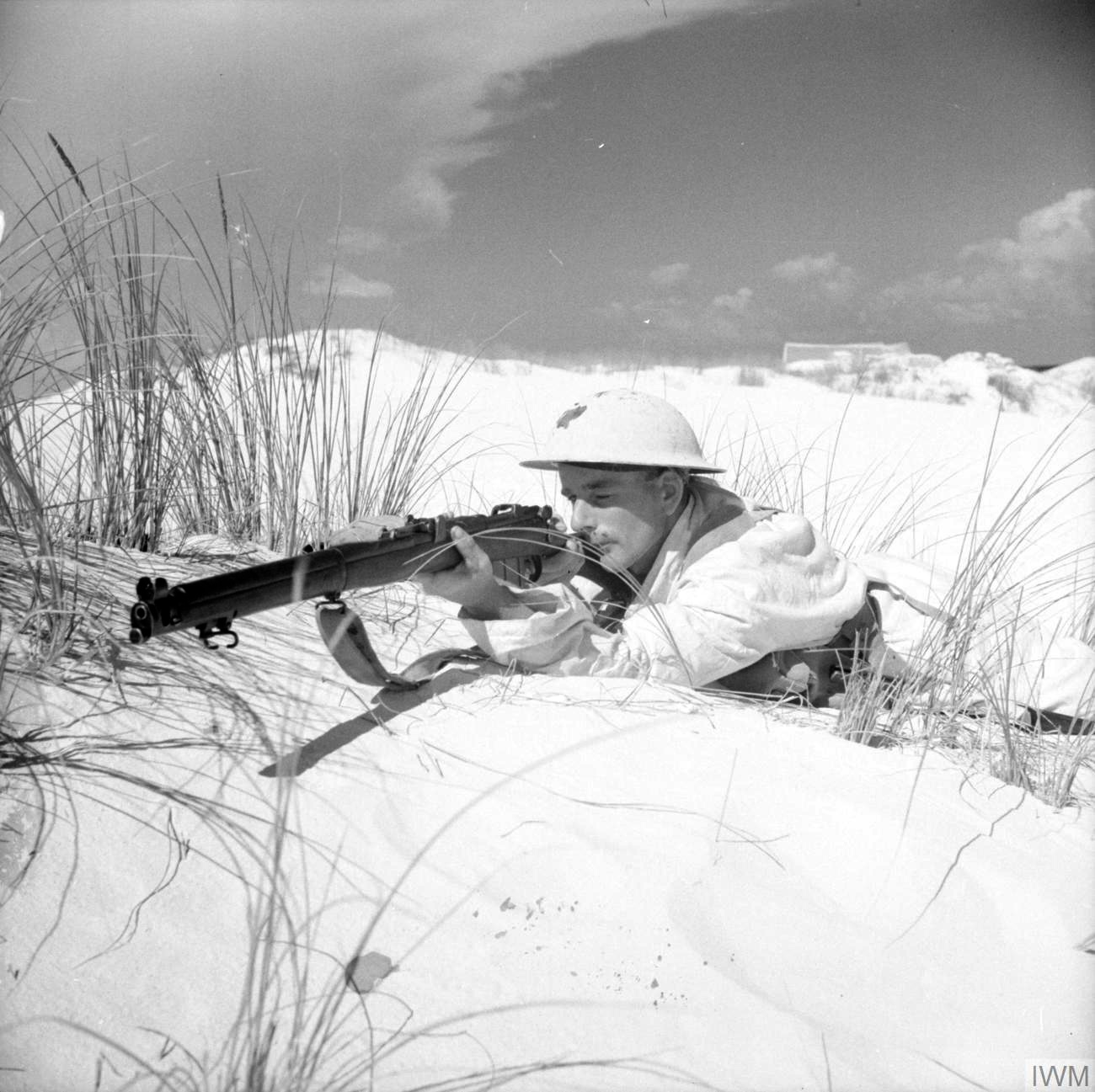
A rifleman of the 1st Battalion, South Staffordshire Regiment wearing a light-coloured oversuit for camouflage against the dunes during training at Mersa Matruh, 25 October 1940.

The regular battalions found themselves fighting in new roles: During the "Chindits" campaign in Burma, the 1st Battalion was part of the 77th Indian Infantry Brigade and were selected for conversion to the Chindits role and fought in Operation Thursday, the second Chindit expedition. During the expedition George Cairns, a lieutenant in the Somerset Light Infantry attached to the battalion was posthumously awarded the Victoria Cross. The battalion took part in jungle fighting against the Japanese forces. After serving as Chindits, they were transferred to the Parachute Regiment, becoming parachute infantry, and converted to the 16th Parachute Battalion. The battalion joined 50th Indian Parachute Brigade, part of the 44th Indian Airborne Division.

The 2nd Battalion, South Staffordshire Regiment was initially serving in the 31st Independent Infantry Brigade until 1941 when it was converted to a Glider infantry role, serving as part of the 1st Airlanding Brigade in the 1st Airborne Division. As such, they landed in Sicily in 1943 where they, along with the rest of the brigade, which was temporarily down to two battalions, suffered heavy casualties during the disastrous Operation Ladbroke. Because of heavy casualties during Ladbroke the brigade did not participate in the invasion of Italy and were withdrawn to England to prepare for the invasion of France. They took part in Operation Market Garden, and played a significant part in the Battle of Arnhem in September 1944.

==== Territorial Army battalions ====
The 5th, 1/6th, 2/6th and 7th battalions, all Territorials, all served as part of the 59th (Staffordshire) Infantry Division alongside battalions of the North Staffordshire Regiment. The 7th Battalion was part of 176th Brigade and the 5th, 1/6th and 2/6th were in 177th Brigade. The division was sent to France in late June 1944 to fight in the Battle for Caen. The division performed well and was considered by Field Marshal Bernard Montgomery as one of the best in the 21st Army Group. However, due to a severe shortage of infantrymen in the British Army at the time, the division was broken up in August 1944 and its units were used as replacements for other British divisions who had suffered heavy casualties and the battalions were broken up and sent to other units.

==== Hostilities-only battalions ====
The regiment raised six other battalions before and during the war but these were used mainly in home defence roles or training units for the battalions overseas, or converted to other roles such as the 14th Battalion which was raised at Hereford racecourse in July 1940 was sent to guard the beaches at Great Yarmouth and Caister-on-Sea. In late 1942, it transferred to the Royal Artillery and converted into the 103rd Anti-Tank Regiment, Royal Artillery and trained in Scotland. However, the regiment was disbanded in August 1943. The 12th Battalion was converted to 91st Light Anti-Aircraft Regiment, Royal Artillery and served with the 4th Infantry Division. Similarly, the 13th Battalion became the 104th Light Anti-Aircraft Regiment, Royal Artillery. The 11th Battalion was raised in 1940 and joined the 209th Infantry Brigade as a training battalion. Following the end of the war, the 11th Battalion was posted to the Middle East where it was disbanded.

==== Victoria Crosses ====
Major Robert Henry Cain seconded to B Company, 2nd Battalion of the regiment from the Royal Northumberland Fusiliers was awarded the Victoria Cross for his participation during the Battle of Arnhem. From 17 to 25 September 1944, Major Cain's company was cut off from the battalion and throughout the whole of this time was closely engaged with enemy tanks, self-propelled guns and infantry. The Major was everywhere danger threatened, moving among his men and encouraging them to hold out. By the end of the Battle, Cain had reportedly been personally responsible for the destruction or disabling of six tanks, four of which were Tigers, as well as a number of self-propelled guns. By his leadership he not only stopped but demoralized the enemy attacks and although he was suffering from a perforated ear-drum and multiple wounds, he refused medical attention. Major Cain's conduct throughout was highly respected, both in terms of personal actions and leadership ability, and for this he was awarded the Victoria Cross; the only living man to receive this medal at Arnhem.

Lance-Sergeant John Daniel Baskeyfield of 2nd Battalion was also awarded the Victoria Cross. On 20 September 1944, Lance-Sergeant Baskeyfield was the NCO in charge of a 6-pounder anti-tank gun at Oosterbeek. When their battalion was attacked, Baskeyfield was badly wounded in the leg, and the rest of the crew were either killed or badly wounded. He refused an offer of transport to the Regimental Aid Post, in order to stay at his gun and encourage morale. After a brief respite, Baskeyfield again came under heavy fire; he refused to cower. After crawling under enemy fire to another 6-pounder gun, he was killed by a shell from a supporting enemy tank. Lance-Sergeant Baskeyfield's body was never found, but there is a memorial statue of him at Festival Heights in Stoke-on-Trent, which was erected in the early 1990s.

The award of the Victoria Cross to both men made the 2nd Battalion the only British battalion to receive two VCs during one engagement in the Second World War.

=== Post-war ===
Following the granting of independence of India in 1947, line infantry regiments in the British Army were reduced to a single regular battalion. Accordingly, the 1st and 2nd Battalions amalgamated in Lichfield in 1948. The new 1st Battalion (38th/80th) travelled to Hong Kong in the following year, and thence to Northern Ireland two years later. Later that year, they were stationed with the British Army of the Rhine in West Germany. In 1954, the battalion was posted to the Suez Canal zone, before being speedily dispatched to Cyprus where hostilities had broken out between the two communities on the island. The 1st Battalion moved to its final posting, in Germany, in September 1957.

In July 1957, a defence review was announced. The South Staffords were to amalgamate with the North Staffordshire Regiment, and to become part of the new administrative Mercian Brigade. The amalgamation of the 1st Battalions of the two regiments took place on 31 January 1959 at Minden, Germany, to form the 1st Battalion, The Staffordshire Regiment.

Following the 1959 amalgamation of the North and South Staffords, the 5th Battalion, South Staffordshire Regiment (TA) continued as a territorial unit of the new regiment without a change of title but was disbanded on the creation of the Territorial Army Volunteer Reserve in 1967.

== Regimental museum ==
The Staffordshire Regiment Museum is based at Whittington Barracks near Lichfield.

== Battle honours ==
The regiment's battle honours were as follows:

- Earlier Wars
  - Guadeloupe 1759, Martinique 1762, South Africa 1878–92, Egypt 1882, Kirbekan, Nile 1884–85, South Africa 1900-02
- First World War
  - Mons, Retreat from Mons, Marne 1914, Aisne 1914 '18, Ypres 1914 '17, Langemarck 1914 '17, Gheluvelt, Nonne Bosschen, Neuve Chapelle, Aubers, Festubert 1915, Loos, Somme 1916 '18, Albert 1916 '18, Bazentin, Delville Wood, Pozières, Flers-Courcelette, Morval, Thiepval, Ancre 1916, Bapaume 1917 '18, Arras 1917 '18, Scarpe 1917 '18, Arleux, Bullecourt, Hill 70, Messines 1917 '18, Menin Road, Polygon Wood, Broodseinde, Poelcappelle, Passchendaele, Cambrai 1917 '18, St. Quentin, Lys, Bailleul, Kemmel, Scherpenberg, Drocourt-Quéant, Hindenburg Line, Havrincourt, Canal du Nord, St. Quentin Canal, Beaurevoir, Selle, Sambre, France and Flanders 1914–18, Piave, Vittorio Veneto, Italy 1917–18, Suvla, Landing at Suvla, Scimitar Hill, Gallipoli 1915, Egypt 1916
- Second World War
  - Caen, Noyers, Falaise, Arnhem 1944, North-West Europe 1940 '44, Sidi Barrani, North Africa 1940, Landing in Sicily, Sicily 1943, Italy 1943, Chindits 1944, Burma 1944

== Colonels of the regiment ==
Regimental Colonels have been:

- 1881–?: (1st Battalion) Gen. James Pattoun Sparks, CB
- 1881–?: (2nd Battalion) Gen. Sir Richard Wilbraham, KCB
- 188n–?: (1st Battalion) Gen. Charles Elmhirst, CB
- 188n–?: (2nd Battalion] Gen. Hon. Sir St George Gerald Foley, KCB
- 1897–1900: Gen. John William Sidney Smith, CB
- 1900–1911: Lt-Gen. Sir George Samuel Young, KCB
- 1911–1935: Lt-Gen. Sir Charles Tucker, GCB, GCVO
- 1935–1946: Maj-Gen. Percy Ryan Conway Commings, CB, CMG, DSO
- 1946–1954: Maj-Gen. Sir Guy de Courcy Glover, KBE, CB, DSO, MC
- 1954–1959: Maj-Gen. Alec Wilfred Lee
- 1959 Regiment amalgamated with the North Staffordshire Regiment to form the Staffordshire Regiment

== Sources ==
- Bidwell, Shelford (1979). The Chindit War: Stilwell, Wingate, and the Campaign in Burma: 1944. New York: Macmillan. ISBN 978-0025106000.
- Featherstone, Donald (1993). Khartoum 1885: General Gordon's last stand. Osprey Publishing. ISBN 978-1855323018.
- Hart, Peter (2014). Gallipoli. Oxford University Press. ISBN 978-0199361274.
- Hart, Stephen Ashley (2007). Colossal Cracks – Montgomery's 21st Army Group in Northwest Europe 1944-45. Stackpole. ISBN 978-0811733830.
- Jones, James P (1923). A History of the South Staffordshire Regiment (1705-1923). Wolverhampton: Whitehead Brothers Limited – via archive.org.
