= Battle of Elephant Point =

Part of Burma Campaign during World War 2

- Part of Operation Dracula, the Burma campaign of World War II
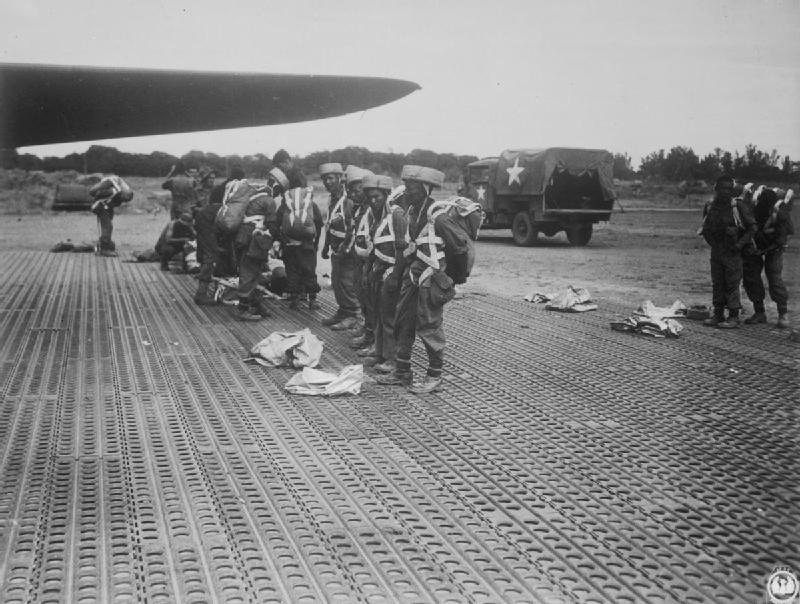
- Gurkha paratroopers check their equipment before being dropped on a series of strategic points around Rangoon
Date	1 May 1945
Location	Near Rangoon 16.45°N 96.32°E
Result	Allied victory

Belligerents
United Kingdom; India	Japan

Commanders and leaders
Major Jack Newland	(Empire of Japan) Unknown

Strength
Composite parachute battalion	Japanese forces

Casualties and losses
Disputed (see notes)	Disputed (see notes)
- First major airborne operation by 44th Indian Airborne Division

The Battle of Elephant Point was an airborne operation at the mouth of the Rangoon River conducted by a composite Gurkha airborne battalion that took place on 1 May 1945. In March 1945, plans were made for an assault on Rangoon, the capital of Burma, as a stepping-stone on the way to recapturing Malaya and Singapore. Initial plans for the assault on the city had called for a purely land-based approach by British Fourteenth Army, but concerns about heavy Japanese resistance led to this being modified with the addition of a joint amphibious-airborne assault. This assault, led by 26th Indian Division, would sail up the Rangoon River, but before it could do so, the river would have to be cleared of Japanese and British mines. In order to achieve this, coastal defences along the river would have to be neutralized, including a battery at Elephant Point.

This task was given to the 44th Indian Airborne Division. However, as the division was in the middle of a reorganisation, a composite battalion was formed from two Gurkha parachute battalions. The battalion assembled and trained throughout April, and was then dropped near Elephant Point early in the morning of 1 May. As it advanced towards the battery one of the battalion's companies was attacked by American bombers, causing a number of casualties. Despite this friendly fire incident, and torrential rain, the battalion successfully assaulted Elephant Point, neutralising the battery there after a fierce firefight. The battalion held the area around Elephant Point until 2 May, when the 26th Indian Division conducted its amphibious assault up the river and secured Rangoon.

== Background ==
On 22 March, as the joint battles of Meiktila and Mandalay were drawing to a close, a conference was held at Monywa in Burma, attended by senior Allied military figures including Admiral Lord Mountbatten, the commander in chief of the Allied South East Asia Command, and General William Slim, commander of Fourteenth Army. The object of the conference was to discuss future Allied strategy in South East Asia in the aftermath of Meiktila and Mandalay, including the reconquest of Burma and the retaking of Malaya and then Singapore. In order to secure these objectives however, Rangoon, the capital of Burma, would have to be captured before the onset of the monsoon rains, which would impede any Allied advance over land. The Allied Chiefs of Staff worked on the assumption that this would occur before June. After Rangoon had fallen, a force of between four and five divisions would be landed in Western Malaya in an operation code-named Zipper, which would itself be followed by Mailfist, the capture of Singapore.

To accommodate all of these goals, Mountbatten insisted that Rangoon be taken by May. Slim had initially planned to take the city in a pincer movement, with XXXIII Corps advancing towards the city down the east bank of the Irrawaddy river via Hlegu, and IV Corps taking a shorter route along the Sittang River valley to the east. Slim believed that the Japanese had insufficient forces to block both thrusts, and that one of the corps would therefore be able to capture Rangoon. However, Mountbatten was unsure that a purely overland advance would be successful, and believed that a joint airborne-amphibious assault would therefore be the better option. Slim and others, such as Slim's superior, General Oliver Leese (commander of Allied Land Forces, South East Asia), initially opposed such an operation, fearing that it would divert vital resources from the Fourteenth Army. By the time of the meeting at Monywa, however, Slim had come around to Mountbatten's way of thinking, fearing that a purely overland advance would meet fierce Japanese resistance, as it had at Meiktila, and be delayed at the end of an overextended supply line. As such, Slim believed that a combined airborne and amphibious assault occurring as the Fourteenth Army neared Rangoon would be ideal, arguing that it would be "a hammering at the back door while I burst in at the front." On 2 April orders were issued for the operation to go ahead, with the proviso that Rangoon be in Allied hands by 5 May at the latest.

=== Planning ===
The joint operation was christened Dracula, and its schedule was decided by the Royal Navy, under the command of Admiral Arthur Power, who was responsible for the amphibious portion of the assault on Rangoon. Several problems had to be overcome during the planning for the operation. The first, and the least likely, was that the amphibious assault would be intercepted by elements of the Imperial Japanese Navy as it neared Rangoon. To ensure that the amphibious elements would remain unmolested, 21 Carrier Squadron, commanded by Commodore G.N. Oliver was attached to provide fighter cover for the landings; the squadron consisted of four escort carriers, two cruisers and four destroyers. Operating further out would be 3rd Battle Squadron, commanded by Vice Admiral Walker, which was formed of two battleships, HMS Queen Elizabeth and the Free French battleship Richelieu, as well another two escort carriers, four cruisers and six destroyers. Two days prior to Dracula taking place, this "massive naval screen" bombed several ports and airfields, and also engaged a Japanese troop convoy transporting more than one thousand Japanese troops to nearby Moulmein, sinking all the vessels. The Royal Air Force would provide support in the form of two RAF long-range fighter Wings, and the United States Army Air Forces with eight B-24 Liberator and four B-25 Mitchell bomber squadrons.

Of more concern to Dracula's planners, however, were land-based threats to the landing craft carrying the assault troops of 26th Indian Division. Air support was deemed to be vital to the operation's success, and a number of Japanese airfields around Toungoo were captured in the days leading up to Dracula. There was also the problem of the defences in and around the Rangoon River, up which the landing craft were to sail. The river itself was heavily mined, a result of both Japanese defensive measures and RAF offensive operations earlier in the conflict. It would have to be swept and cleared of mines before any amphibious assault could take place. Before this could occur, however, the coastal defences along the banks of the river would have to be neutralized; a particular worry was the presence of an artillery battery at Elephant Point on the west bank of the river. The geography of the area ensured that the battery could not be destroyed through artillery bombardment or airstrikes, and weather conditions precluded an early amphibious assault. As such, it was decided that a day before Dracula began on 2 May, a parachute battalion would be dropped near Elephant Point with the task of assaulting and destroying the battery.

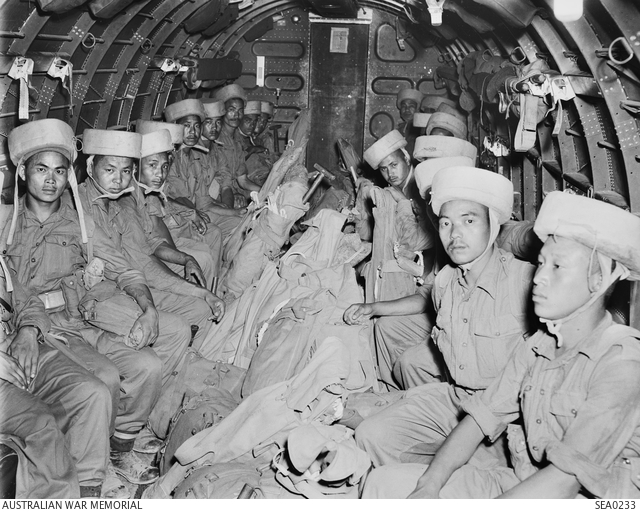
Indian paratroops waiting to jump over Rangoon, Burma, 1945.

The task was given to 44th Indian Airborne Division, but this presented several problems. The division was in the middle of a reorganization, and many of its officers were on leave, as were two Gurkha airborne battalions; another, the 3rd Gurkha Parachute Battalion, was about to transfer to 77th Indian Parachute Brigade. With no one unit available, a composite force was put together for the operation. The Headquarters Company was formed of men from 2nd and 3rd Gurkha parachute battalions, and each battalion provided a further two companies – A and B from 2nd Gurkha Parachute Battalion and C and D from 3rd Gurkha Parachute Battalion. A mortar platoon and machine gun platoon augmented the ad hoc formation. The makeshift battalion was formed in early April, and came under the command of Major Jack Newland. After its initial formation it transferred to Chaklala, where its strength was augmented by field ambulance and Indian engineers sections and it undertook training for the operation. When this was completed the battalion was transported to Midnapore, where for ten days it assembled its equipment and conducted a rehearsal exercise. Finally, on 29 April, it was flown to Akyab on the Burmese coast, approximately 200 miles north of Rangoon, where it was soon joined by a 200-strong reserve force formed of men from both Gurkha battalions and 152nd Indian Parachute Battalion. The battalion would be transported in 40 C-47 Skytrain transport aircraft belonging to 1st and 2nd United States Air Commando groups.

== Battle ==
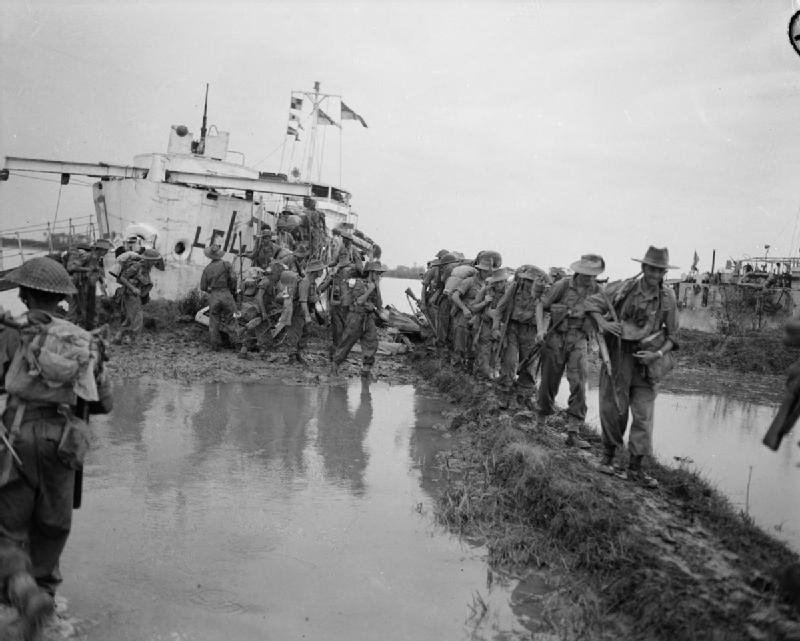
Men of the 15th Indian Corps land near Elephant Point at the beginning of operation "Dracula", 2 May 1945

At 02:30 on 1 May, a C-47 belonging to 317 Tactical Control Squadron USAAF departed for Rangoon carrying a twenty-man pathfinder team, followed by a CCG (Company Command Group) plane carrying equipment to set up a pair of VCPs (Vehicle Check Point), to mark and defend the landing zone at Tawhai. The rest of the composite battalion boarded thirty-eight Dakotas and took off thirty minutes later, jumping out over the drop zone at 05:45. There were only a few casualties during the drop, one being a medical officer attached to the battalion. The battalion encountered no Japanese opposition during the drop, and after it had rallied, advanced towards Elephant Point and the artillery battery. It halted 3,000 yards in front of the battery to allow B-24 Liberators from the USAAF to carry out a preliminary bombing attack on the battery (356 Squadron R.A.F., flying B-24 Liberators, attacked the battery prior to the assault, 12 aircraft bombing between 09:44 and 10:14 hrs. The Operation Record Book notes that two aircraft had already bombed prior to their arrival. From later photographic plotting of the bombing, 8 of the aircraft recorded strikes outside the exact target, including in the river). Despite their officers and other ranks wearing yellow recognition panels and carrying orange umbrellas to identify themselves, C Company was bombed and strafed by the bombers, causing a number of casualties. (Note: Sources disagree on the exact number of casualties. Allen (p. 479) states that "over thirty casualties" were caused, whilst both Tugwell (p. 284) and Latimer (p. 414) give the figure of "forty casualties". Harclerode (p. 640) provides the exact figures of fifteen killed and thirty wounded.) As a result, a forward air controller attached to the battalion ordered a halt to all further bombing runs on the battery.

Moving forward through torrential rain, the battalion reached Elephant Point at 16:00, and close-quarters fighting then took place, with flame-throwers being used against several Japanese bunkers guarding the battery. About forty Japanese soldiers and gunners were killed during the assault, and the battalion also sustained several casualties. (Note: Once again, the figures given for Japanese casualties and prisoners vary. Tugwell (p. 285) states that forty-three Japanese soldiers were killed, while Harclerode (p. 461) states thirty-seven. Allen (p. 479) gives the figure of thirty-seven, but says that thirty-six were killed and one taken prisoner. British casualties are also varied. Tugwell (p. 285) gives the figure of seven casualties during the assault, and Harclerode (p. 461) a total of forty-one during the entire action, including the casualties caused by friendly fire.) After the battery had been secured the battalion dug in around Elephant Point and awaited the arrival of the relief force, which landed at Thaunggon at 15:30, with a supply drop following it several minutes later. As it neared the position of the battalion, the surgical team accompanying the relief force was accidentally fired upon by the Gurkhas, causing four members of the team to be wounded. The battalion remained where it was through the night, although high tides submerged a number of trenches and forced the battalion to higher ground. By the dawn of 2 May, after clearing a number of nearby bunkers, the battalion was able to watch as minesweepers cleared the Rangoon river of mines to allow safe access for the columns of landing craft following behind them.

== Aftermath ==
Operation Dracula was a complete success. As Japanese forces had actually vacated Rangoon several days prior to the amphibious landing; 36th Indian Infantry Brigade was able to occupy the city without encountering any Japanese opposition. On 3 May the composite battalion moved to Sadainghmut, and two days later, leaving one company behind, it was transferred to Rangoon where it conducted anti-looting operations and also searched for Japanese stragglers remaining in the city. It left the city on 16 May and travelled to India by ship, where it rejoined 44th Indian Airborne Division. The Battle of Elephant Point had been the division's first major airborne operation. The 2nd Air Commando Group's C-47s, which had transported the parachute battalion, returned to Kalaikunda and then moved to Comilla. The 317th Tactical Control Squadron spent the next two weeks supplying XV Corps who were engaged with Japanese forces northeast of Rangoon and returned to Kalaikunda on 19 May. The group's fighter squadrons provided air cover for Rangoon until 9 May when they too returned to home station.

== Bibliography ==
- Allen, Louis (1984). Burma: The Longest War 1941–45. Book Club Associates.
- Harclerode, Peter (2005). Wings Of War – Airborne Warfare 1918–1945. Weidenfeld & Nicolson. ISBN 0-304-36730-3.
- Latimer, Jon (2004). Burma: The Forgotten War. John Murray. ISBN 0-7195-6575-8.
- Tugwell, Maurice (1971). Airborne To Battle – A History Of Airborne Warfare 1918–1971. William Kimber & Co Ltd. ISBN 0-7183-0262-1.
- Y'Blood, William T. (2008). Air Commandos Against Japan: Allied Special Operations in World War II Burma. Naval Institute Press. ISBN 978-1-59114-993-4.
