= Stafford Street drill hall, Wolverhampton =

Former military installation

Stafford Street drill hall
- Wolverhampton
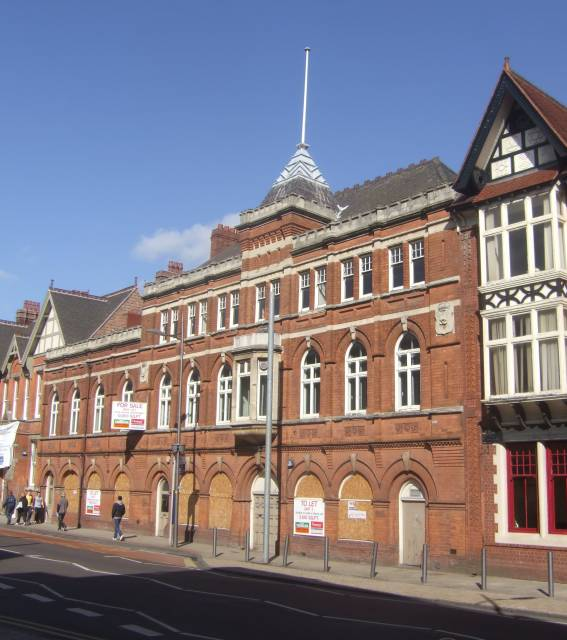
- Stafford Street drill hall

Site information
- Type: Drill hall

Location
- Location within West Midlands
- Coordinates: 52.58739°N 2.12616°W

Site history
- Built: 1890
- Built for: War Office
- In use: 1890-Present

The Stafford Street drill hall is a former military installation in Wolverhampton, West Midlands.

== History ==
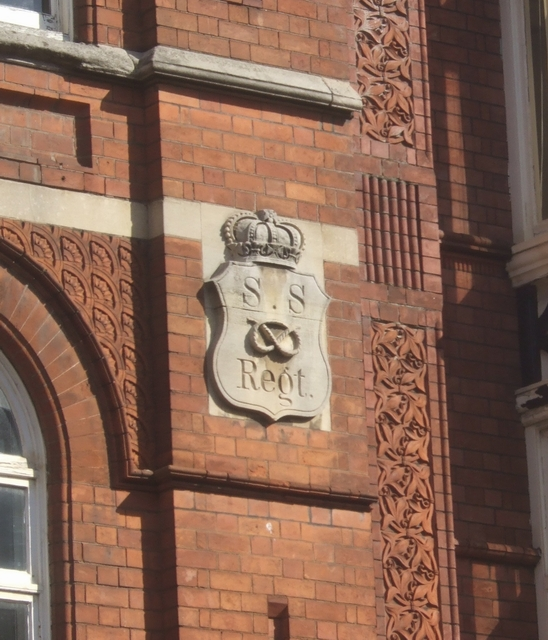

The building was designed as the headquarters of the 3rd Volunteer Battalion, the South Staffordshire Regiment and was completed in 1890. This unit evolved to become the 6th Battalion, the South Staffordshire Regiment in 1908. The battalion was mobilised for the First World War at the drill hall in August 1914 before being deployed to the Western Front. The drill hall was also the home of D Squadron, Staffordshire Yeomanry.

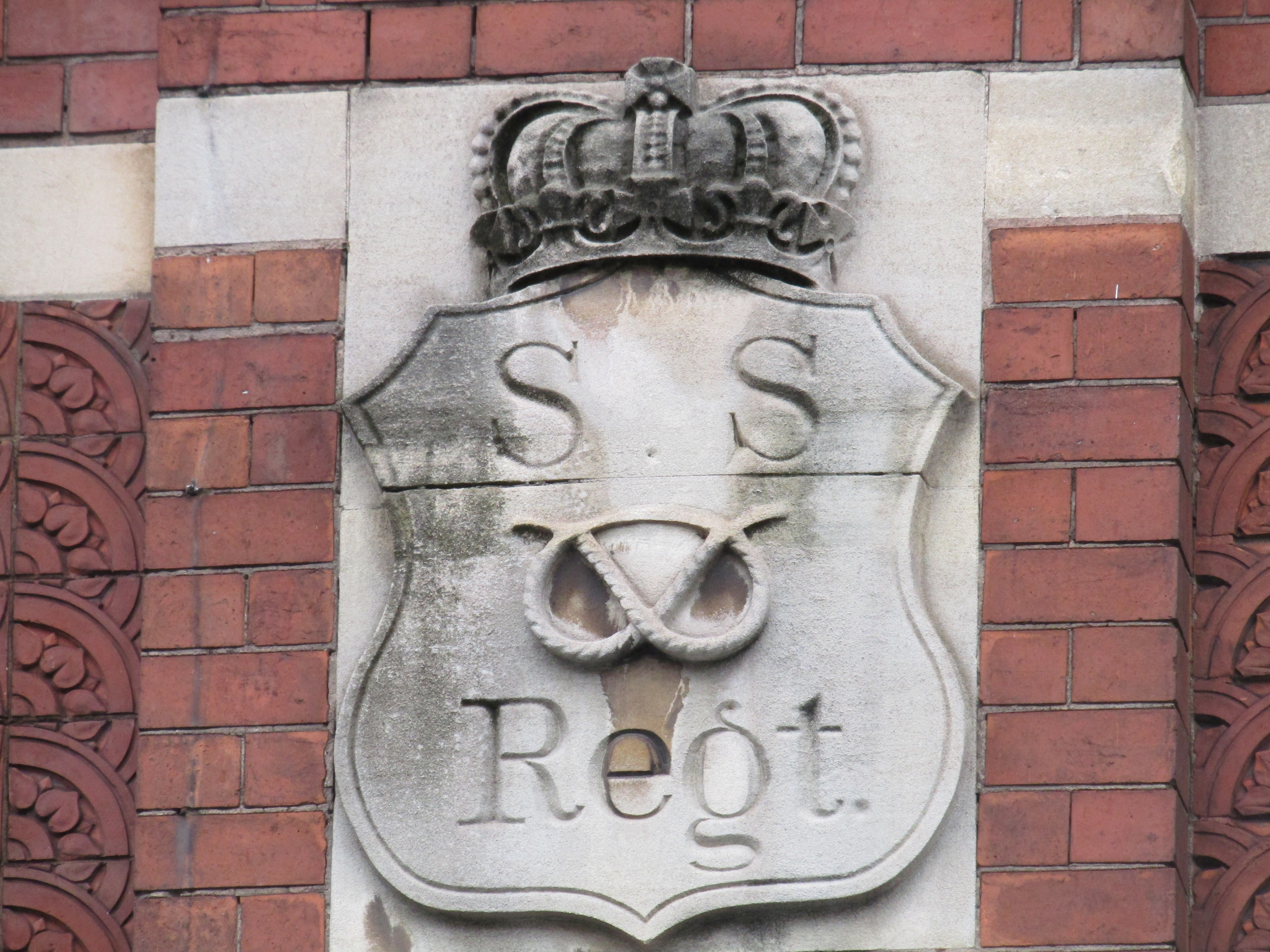

The battalion amalgamated with the 5th Battalion to form the 5th/6th (Territorial) Battalion, The Staffordshire Regiment (The Prince of Wales's) with its headquarters in Wolverhampton in 1967. After the battalion moved to Wolseley House in Wolverhampton, the Stafford Street drill hall was decommissioned and acquired by the University of Wolverhampton. It has since been converted by Liam Wordley, a developer, into student accommodation.
