= 77th Indian Infantry Brigade =

77th Indian Infantry Brigade 77th Indian Parachute Brigade
- Active: 1942–1945
- Country: (British Raj) British India
- Allegiance: British Empire
- Branch: British Indian Army
- Type: Infantry; Airborne forces
- Role: Parachute infantry
- Size: Brigade

Commanders
- Notable commanders: Orde Wingate; Mike Calvert

The 77th Indian Infantry Brigade was an infantry brigade formation of the Indian Army during World War II. It was formed in India in June 1942. The brigade was assigned to the Chindits and organised into eight columns for operations behind enemy lines in Burma. In March 1945, it was converted into the 77th Indian Parachute Brigade and assigned to the 44th Airborne Division.

== Composition ==
=== 1942–1943 ===
- 13th Battalion, King's Regiment (Liverpool)
- 3rd Battalion, 2nd Gurkha Rifles
- 2nd Battalion, Burma Rifles
- 3rd Battalion, 9th Gurkha Rifles January 1944–August 1944
- 12th Battalion, Nigeria Regiment April 1944–May 1944
- 7th Battalion, Nigeria Regiment April 1944–May 1944

=== 1943–1945 ===
- 3rd Battalion, 6th Gurkha Rifles
- 1st Battalion, King's Regiment (Liverpool)
- 1st Battalion, Lancashire Fusiliers
- 1st Battalion, South Staffordshire Regiment

=== 77th Parachute Brigade ===
- 15th (King's) Parachute Battalion
- 16th (Staffords) Parachute Battalion
- 2nd Battalion, Indian Parachute Regiment
- 4th Battalion, Indian Parachute Regiment

== See also ==
- List of Indian Army Brigades in World War II
