= 14th Airlanding Brigade =

- Founded: 1944
- Allegiance: British India (1940 - 47); Pakistan (1947 - onwards)
- Branch: British Indian Army; Pakistan Army
- Type: Airborne forces
- Role: Glider infantry
- Size: 1 brigade
- Part of: 44th Airborne Division

The 14th Airlanding Brigade was a formation of the British Indian Army and then the Pakistan Army. It was formed from the 14th British Infantry Brigade on 1 November 1944, and was initially part of the 44th Airborne Division. Initially the brigade included 4/6th Rajputana Rifles, 2nd Black Watch, 2nd King's Own Royal Regiment, and 6/16th Punjab Regiment. During the Second World War it was commanded by Brigadier Thomas Brodie and later Brigadier F.W. Gibb.

Later as part of 2 Indian Airborne Division, the brigade headquarters was transferred to the Pakistan Army.
