= Peter Young (British Army officer, born 1912) =

British Army officer

Major-General Peter Young CB CBE
- Born: 15 July 1912
- Died: 4 November 1976 (aged 64); Pewsey, Wiltshire, England
- Military career
- Allegiance: United Kingdom
- Branch: British Army
- Service years: 1932–1968
- Rank: Major-General
- Service number: 53743
- Unit: Oxfordshire and Buckinghamshire Light Infantry
- Commands: Cyprus District; 1st Brigade Royal Nigeria Regiment; 44 Parachute Brigade; 1st Battalion, Oxfordshire and Buckinghamshire Light Infantry; 16th (Staffords) Parachute Battalion
- Conflicts: Second World War; Palestine Emergency; Cypriot intercommunal violence
- Awards: Companion of the Order of the Bath; Commander of the Order of the British Empire

Major-General Peter George Francis Young, CB, CBE (15 July 1912 – 4 November 1976) was a senior British Army officer who served in the Second World War and later was General Officer Commanding Cyprus District from 1962 to 1964.

== Military career ==
Peter Young was born on 15 July 1912 and was educated at Winchester College and the Royal Military College, Sandhurst. He was commissioned as a second lieutenant into the Oxfordshire and Buckinghamshire Light Infantry (OBLI) on 1 September 1932. He was posted to the 1st Battalion, OBLI (the former 43rd Regiment of Foot). He served with the Royal West African Frontier Force in Nigeria from 1935 and then with the 2nd Ox and Bucks (the 52nd) in India from 1939.

During World War II Young was second-in-command of the 2nd Battalion, Ox and Bucks, then having returned to England and forming part of the 1st Airlanding Brigade of Major General Frederick Browning's 1st Airborne Division, at Bulford, Wiltshire, from June 1942 to February 1943. He served with the 3rd Parachute Battalion, part of Brigadier Gerald Lathbury's 3rd Parachute Brigade, during Operation Husky, the Allied invasion of Sicily, in July 1943 where he was taken prisoner of war (POW). He was a POW in Oflag 1X AZ at Rotenburg in Hesse during 1943 and 1944 when having convinced his captors that he was suffering from deafness he was repatriated and he became a General Staff Officer Grade 2 (Airborne) at the War Office.

Young commanded the 16th (Staffords) Parachute Battalion in India and also attended the Staff College, Quetta in 1946. He became assistant adjutant and quartermaster general (AA&QMG) at the HQ of the 6th Airborne Division, in Palestine during the Palestine Emergency in 1947. Returning to England, he was an instructor at the Staff College, Camberley in 1948. He was a General Staff Officer Grade 1 in Operations and Training, Allied Land Forces Central Europe between 1951 and 1952. Young became commanding officer (CO) of the 1st Battalion, OBLI in the Suez Canal Zone in 1952 and remained in command of the battalion following its move to Osnabrück, West Germany, in 1953. He became commander of 44 Parachute Brigade TA in 1955 and commander of 1st Brigade Royal Nigeria Regiment in 1958. He was posted to the War Office in 1961 and became General Officer Commanding Cyprus District in 1962. At the original ceasefire in 1964 Young drew a line on a map with a blunt green chinagraph pencil identifying the truce line between the Greek Cypriot and Turkish Cypriot communities. It became known internationally as the Green Line. He was director of infantry at the Ministry of Defence from 1965 to 1967 and retired from the army in 1968. Young was chairman of the 43rd and 52nd Old Comrades Association from 1968.

== Family ==
Young married Patricia FitzGerald in 1949 and had two children, Susan Elizabeth (born 1951) and James Peter Gerald (born 1954). He lived in Pewsey, Wiltshire.
