= 16th (Staffords) Parachute Battalion =

- Cap badge of the Parachute Regiment
- Country: United Kingdom
- Branch: British Army
- Type: Infantry
- Role: Airborne forces
- Size: Battalion
- Part of: 77th Indian Parachute Brigade
- Nickname(s): Red Devils

Commanders
- Notable commanders: Peter Young

Insignia
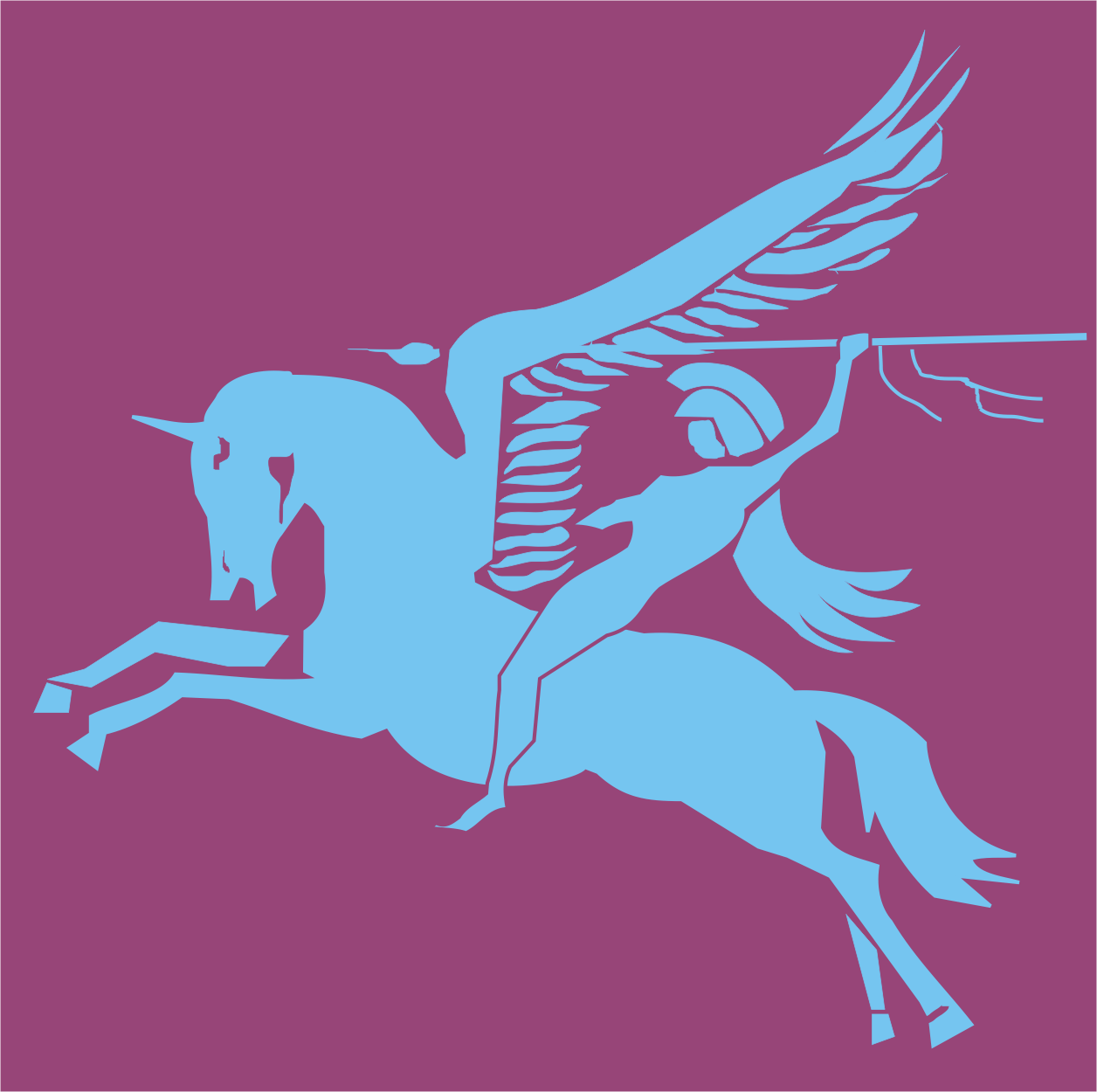
- The emblem of the Second World War British Airborne Forces, Bellerophon riding the flying horse Pegasus

The 16th (Staffords) Parachute Battalion was an airborne infantry battalion of the Parachute Regiment, raised by the British Army in World War II.

== World War II ==
The battalion was formed in India from the 1st Battalion of the South Staffordshire Regiment in January 1945. The South Staffords had previously been part of the Chindits special force and took part in the second Chindit expedition in 1944, Operation Thursday. The battalion was then assigned to the 77th Indian Parachute Brigade, attached to the 44th Indian Airborne Division. The war ended before the battalion was committed to action but a number of men parachuted into Japanese Prisoner of War camps to aid the prisoners.

== Territorial Army ==
The battalion was disbanded in 1946, but a new battalion was formed in the United Kingdom as part of the Territorial Army. Renamed the 16th (Welsh) Parachute Battalion (TA), it was assigned to the TA 5th Parachute Brigade of the 16th Airborne Division. It was re-designated 16 (Welsh) PARA (TA) in 1948 and resulting from defence cuts disbanded in October 1956.
