= Luke Lillingstone =

British army officer

Brigadier-General Luke Lillingstone
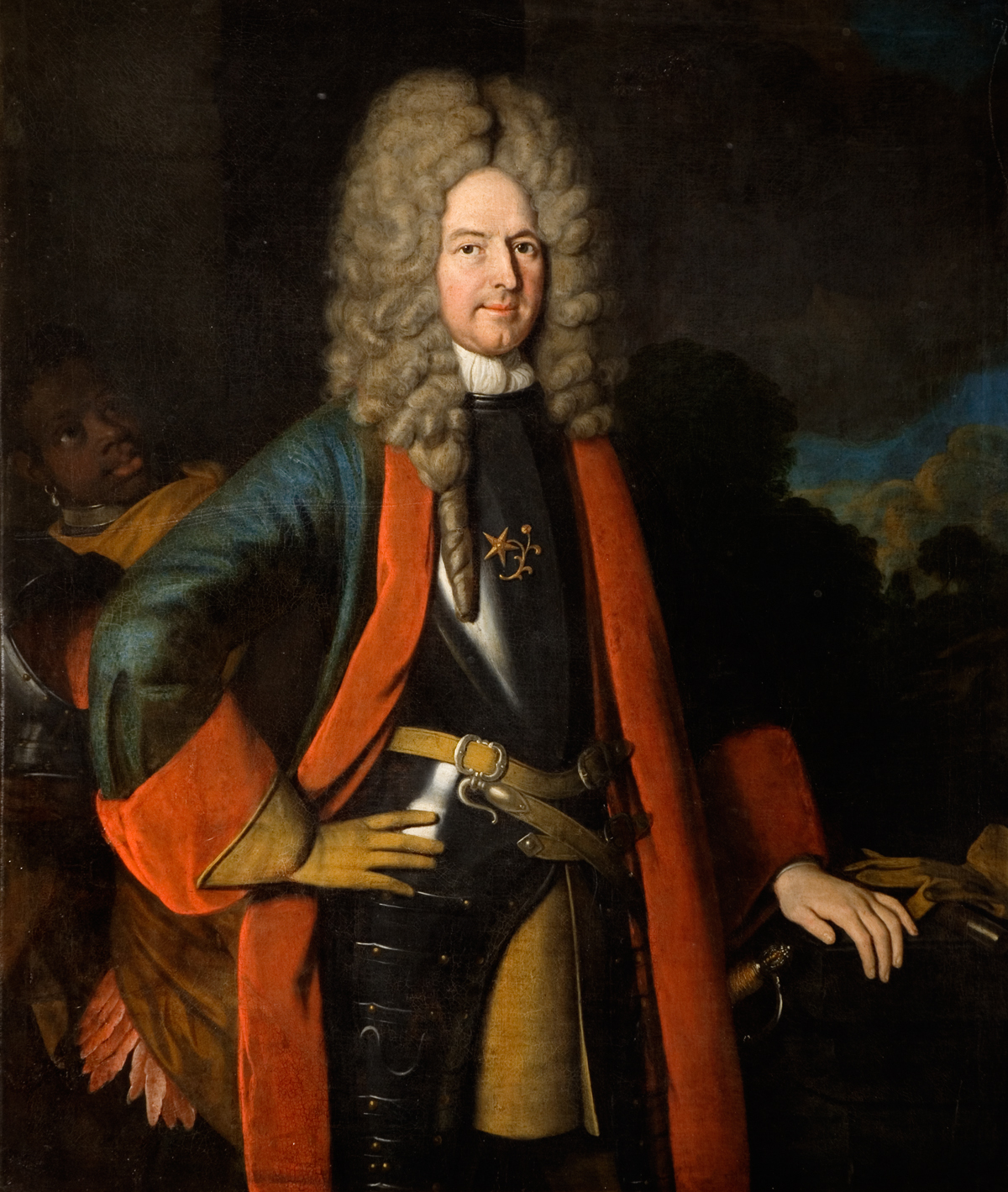
- Born: 1653
- Died: 6 April 1713 (aged 59–60)

Brigadier-General Luke Lillingstone (or Lillingston or Lillingstein; 1653 – 6 April 1713) was a British Army officer who accompanied William of Orange to England in 1688.

== Early life ==
Lillingstone was born to Colonel Henry Lillingstone, of German extraction from Lilienstein. His maternal uncle, Colonel Thomas Dolman, served with his father in the Anglo-Dutch Brigade. Lillingstone himself was commissioned as an officer in the Brigade in 1673 and 1688 he accompanied William of Orange to England.

== Command ==
After fighting against Jacobite forces in Ireland, Lillingstone received his first command in 1692, when he took over the colonelcy of Jonathan Foulkes's Regiment on the latter's death. On assuming command the regiment became Luke Lillingstone's Regiment of Foot, and was to be the first of three regiments to bear this title.

Lillingstone's regiment was disbanded in 1694, but was reraised the same year for service in the West Indies. This second regiment was disbanded in 1696 or 1697.

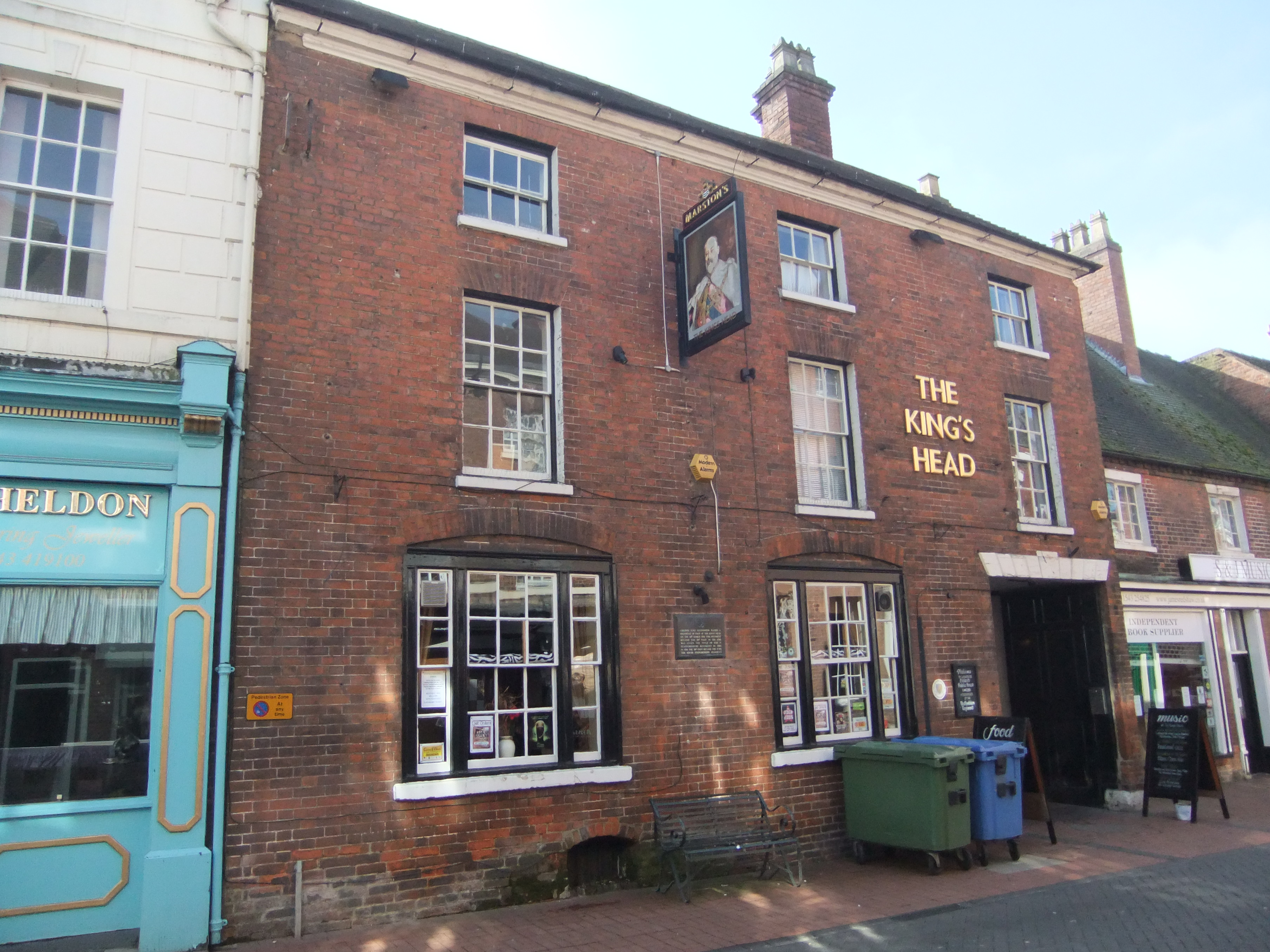
The King's Head, Lichfield

Lillingstone was without a command until 1705, when he was authorised to raise a regiment of foot. The third Lillingstone's Regiment was duly raised at the King's Head, Bird Street, Lichfield on 25 March 1705. The regiment was ordered to Antigua in 1707, but Lillingstone did not accompany it. In 1708 Lillingstone was promoted to the rank of brigadier-general, and ordered to join his regiment. He refused, and was dismissed on 2 June. Lillingstone's Regiment was given to his second-in-command, becoming James Jones's Regiment of Foot. The regiment continued in existence, becoming the 38th Regiment of Foot in 1751, one of the forebears of the modern Mercian Regiment.

== Later life ==
Lillingstone was refused the purchase price of his regiment, and this led to the forced sale of his estate, Ferriby Grange, North Ferriby, in the East Riding of Yorkshire. Lillingstone was married twice, first to Elizabeth, daughter of Robert Sanderson of Bonnel, who died on 18 October 1699. His second wife was Catherine, daughter and heiress of Colonel Hassell of Kirby Grindalyth, Yorkshire. Neither marriage produced a male heir and Lillingstone's estates of North Ferriby and Kirby Grindalyth passed to his sister's son, Luke Bowden, who took the name of Lillingstone, and whose granddaughter married and gave her surname to Abraham Spooner in 1797. Abraham Spooner Lillingstone was the son of the banker Isaac Spooner and brother-in-law to William Wilberforce by his sister Barbara Ann Spooner. Lillingstone died on 6 April 1713, and a monument to his memory was erected in the parish church of All Saints, North Ferriby. The monument features life-size effigies of Lillingstone and his second wife.
