= Most Highly Derogatory Order of the Irremovable Finger =

Spoof UK military decoration

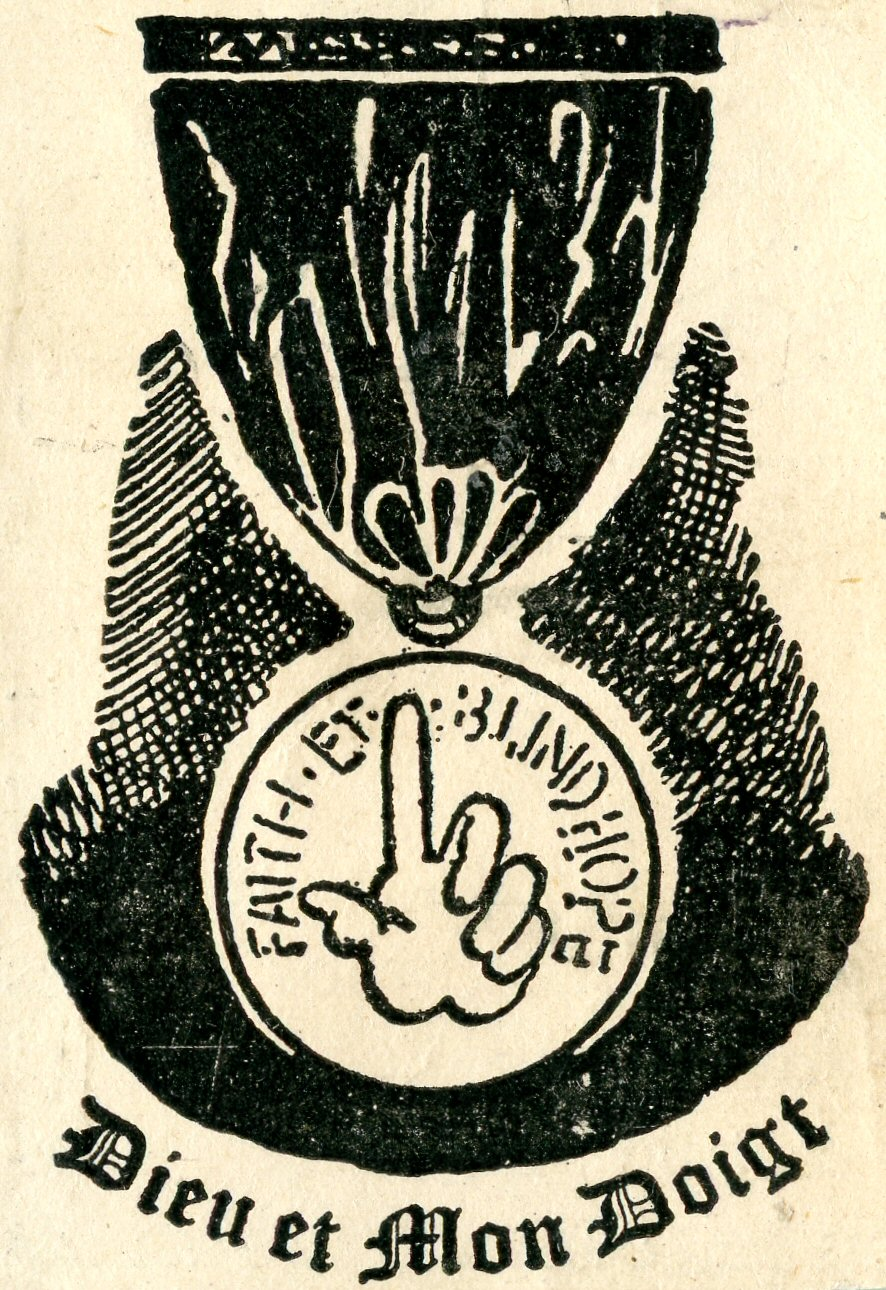
Most Highly Derogatory Order of the Irremovable Finger

The Most Highly Derogatory Order of the Irremovable Digit, abbreviated to MHDOID, was a spoof decoration for military incompetence, which was "awarded" to members of the Royal Air Force during World War II.

It was the inspiration of Squadron Leader Anthony Armstrong Willis OBE MC, the editor of the RAF's monthly Training Memorandum, (which was usually referred to by its initials as Tee Emm). Recipients of the award were "gazetted" in this publication.

No official medal was struck for the award, though cartoon depictions show a clenched fist with the index finger extended, surrounded by the words FAITH ET BLIND HOPE and underneath the legend Dieu et Mon Doigt [God and my finger]. (The use of the index finger indicated clearly that the finger of blame was being pointed at the recipient, rather than the middle finger as a contemporary obscene gesture.) If appropriate, a 'Joint' was awarded for additional acts of stupidity, analogous to a Medal bar.

Most recipients were aircrew, as they generally made the most spectacular and public errors, although any RAF personnel were eligible.

Among those receiving the award were the crew of a bomber who became lost over enemy-occupied Europe. They crash-landed the aircraft in a field, set fire to it to deny the enemy access to its technical secrets and began to walk to safety, only to find themselves outside a public house in England, barely five miles from their own airfield.

The last award of the war went to an RAF station commander just before VE day. The German pilot of a Focke-Wulf Fw 190 landed to surrender himself and his aircraft. The station commander bellowed, "Tell the pilot of that Mustang to observe proper landing procedure."

== Sources ==
- Lt.Col. Dicky Dickinson and Bill Hooper, Clangers in uniform, Midas Books, Tunbridge Wells, Kent, ISBN 0-85936-036-9
- Royal Air Force Museum, Pilot Officer Prune's Picture Parade, Stationery Office Books; 1st Ed edition (Sep 1991), ISBN 0-11-772637-0
- Squadron archives of 401 SQN RCAF.
