= 38th (1st Staffordshire) Regiment of Foot =

- Active: 1705–1881
- Country: Kingdom of England (1705–1707); Kingdom of Great Britain (1707–1800); United Kingdom (1801–1881)
- Branch: British Army
- Type: Infantry
- Size: 1 battalion (2 battalions 1804–1814)
- Garrison/HQ: Whittington Barracks, Lichfield
- Engagements: American Revolutionary War; French Revolutionary Wars; Napoleonic Wars; Fifth Xhosa War; First Anglo-Burmese War; Crimean War; Indian Rebellion

The 38th (1st Staffordshire) Regiment of Foot was an infantry regiment of the British Army, raised in 1705. Under the Childers Reforms it amalgamated with the 80th Regiment of Foot (Staffordshire Volunteers) to form the South Staffordshire Regiment in 1881.

== History ==
=== Early years ===
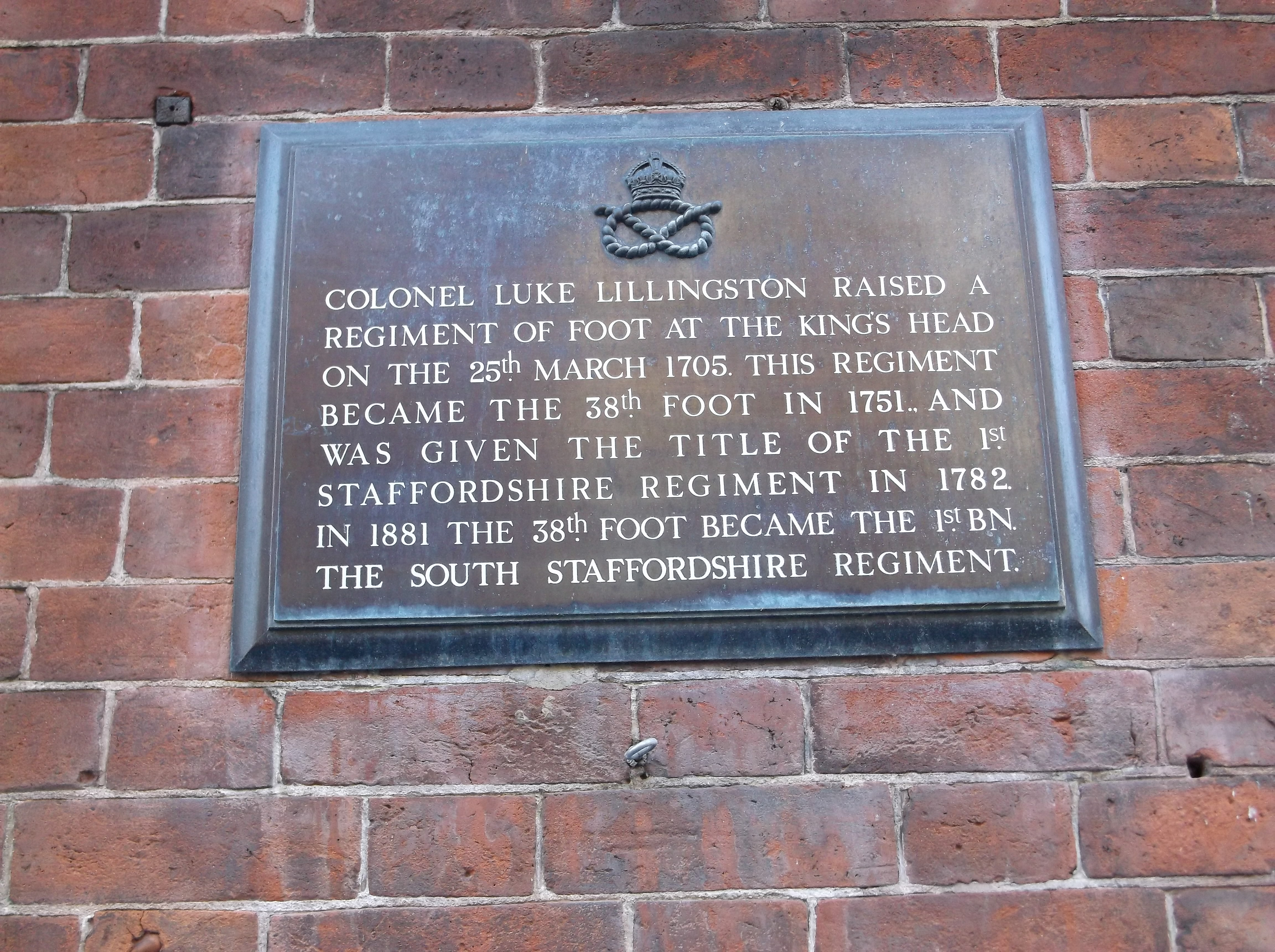
Plaque in Lichfield commemorating the regiment's founding in March 1705

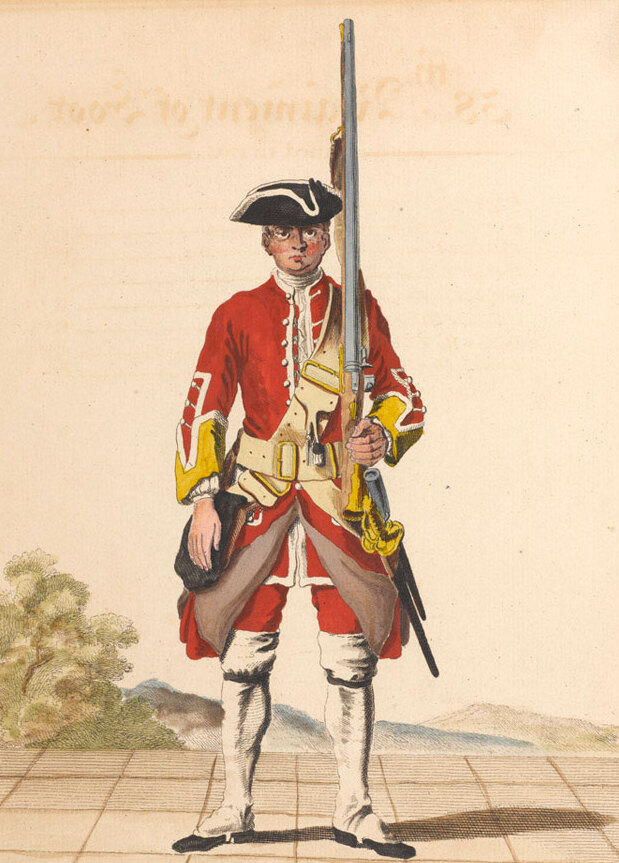
c. 1742 engraving of a regimental private

c. 1751 painting of a regimental grenadier (centre)

The regiment was first raised by Colonel Sir John Guise as Sir John Guise's Regiment of Foot in 1688 and then disbanded in England in 1694. It was raised a second time by General Luke Lillingston as Luke Lillingstone's Regiment of Foot with personnel from the previous regiment in 1694 and then disbanded in the West Indies in 1696.

The regiment was raised a third time at Lichfield by General Luke Lillingston as Luke Lillingstone's Regiment of Foot in March 1705. It was ranked as the 38th regiment in 1747. It was posted to Ireland later in the year and then sent to the West Indies in 1707. On 1 July 1751 a royal warrant was issued which provided that in future regiments would no longer be known by their colonel's name, but would bear a regimental number based on their precedence: the regiment became the 38th Regiment of Foot. It returned to Ireland in 1764 and then went to Boston in Massachusetts in 1774. It fought at the Battle of Bunker Hill in June 1775 and at the Battle of Brandywine in September 1777 during the American Revolutionary War. The regiment took a county title as the 38th (1st Staffordshire) Regiment of Foot in 1782 and returned to Ireland in 1790.

=== French Revolutionary and Napoleonic Wars ===
Following the outbreak of war with France, the flank companies of the regiment sailed for the West Indies and in March 1794 took part in the capture of Martinique. Meanwhile, the battalion companies of the 38th served in the Low Countries with the Duke of York. In 1796 the regiment was reunited in the West Indies and in May 1796 took part in the capture of Saint Lucia and the capture of Trinidad in 1797. After taking part in the capture of the Cape of Good Hope at the Battle of Blaauwberg in January 1806, it embarked for South America where it fought under General William Beresford at the capture of Montevideo in January 1807 and at the attack on Buenos Aires in July 1807 during the British invasions of the River Plate.

The 1st battalion embarked for the Peninsula in June 1808 and saw action at the Battle of Roliça in August 1808, the Battle of Vimeiro later in August 1808, and the retreat to Corunna under Lieutenant-General Sir John Moore in June 1809. The 1st battalion also took part in the disastrous Walcheren Campaign in autumn 1809. The 1st battalion returned to the Peninsula in spring 1812 and took part in the Battle of Salamanca in July 1812, the siege of Burgos in September 1812, and the Battle of Vitoria in June 1813 as well as the siege of San Sebastián in September 1813. It then pursued the French Army into France and fought at the Battle of Nivelle in November 1813, at the Battle of the Nive in December 1813 and at the Battle of Orthez in February 1814 as well as at the Battle of Toulouse in April 1814 and at the Battle of Bayonne later in April 1814. Meanwhile, the 2nd battalion took part in the Battle of Bussaco in September 1810 and the siege of Badajoz in March 1812.

=== Victorian era ===
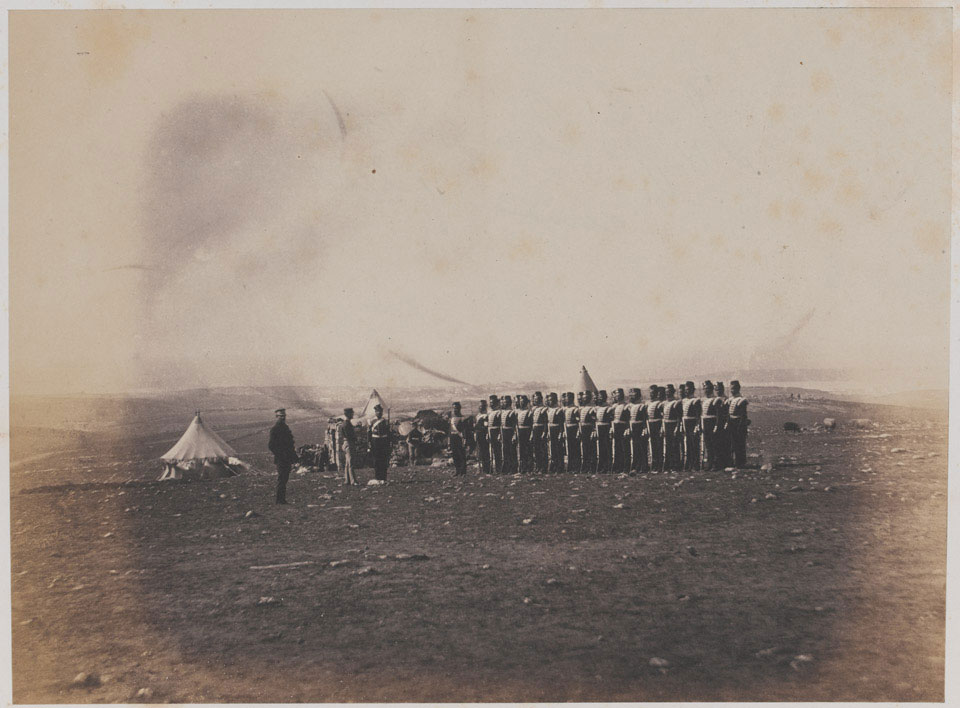
The remnants of the regiment's light company parading in 1855

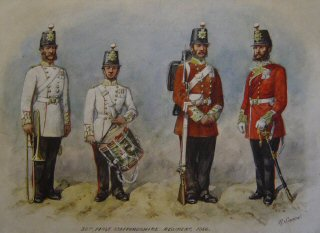
Illustration of the regimental uniform in 1856

The regiment was sent to the Cape of Good Hope for service in the Fifth Xhosa War in 1818 and then to India in 1822 from where it was deployed to Burma for service in the First Anglo-Burmese War in 1824. It returned to England in May 1836 and proceeded to Ireland in May 1837 before embarking for Zante in the Ionian Sea in September 1840. It went on to Gibraltar in March 1843 and to Jamaica in November 1845 before proceeding to Halifax, Nova Scotia in April 1848. After returning to England in August 1851, it was dispatched to the Crimea for service in the Crimean War in April 1854. It took part in the Battle of the Alma in September 1854, Battle of Inkerman in November 1854 and the siege of Sevastopol in winter 1854. The regiment then embarked for India in August 1857 and saw action at the Capture of Lucknow in March 1858 during Indian Rebellion. It also took part in the expedition against the Black Mountain tribes in 1868 before returning to England in 1871.

As part of the Cardwell Reforms of the 1870s, where single-battalion regiments were linked together to share a single depot and recruiting district in the United Kingdom, the 38th was linked with the 80th Regiment of Foot (Staffordshire Volunteers), and assigned to district no. 19 at Whittington Barracks in Lichfield. On 1 July 1881 the Childers Reforms came into effect and the regiment amalgamated with the 80th Regiment of Foot (Staffordshire Volunteers) to form the South Staffordshire Regiment.

== Battle honours ==
The battle honours of the regiment were as follows:

- South America: Monte Video
- Peninsular War: Roliça, Vimiera, Corunna, Busaco, Badajoz, Salamanca, Vitoria, San Sebastián, Nive, Peninsula
- First Anglo-Burmese War: Ava
- Crimean War: Alma, Inkerman, Sevastopol
- Indian Mutiny: Lucknow
- West Indies: Guadeloupe 1759, Martinique 1762 (awarded 1909 to successor regiment)

== Regimental colonels ==
The colonels of the regiment were as follows:

First raising

- 1688–1689: Sir John Guise
- 1689–1693: Jonathan Foulkes
- 1693-1694: Brig-Gen. Luke Lillingston
- disbanded 1694

Second raising

- 1694–1696: Brig-Gen. Luke Lillingston
- disbanded 1696

Third raising

- 1702–1705: vacant?
- 1705–1708: Brig-Gen. Luke Lillingston
- 1708–1711: Col. James Jones
- 1711–1717: Col. Francis Alexander
- 1717–1729: Col. Richard Lucas
- 1729–1735: Brig-Gen. Edward Jones
- 1735–1738: Brig-Gen. Hon. Robert Murray
- 1738–1739: Gen. Charles Spencer, 3rd Duke of Marlborough, KG
- 1739–1750: Lt-Gen. Robert Dalzell
- 1750–October 1750: Lt-Gen. Richard Philipps

38th Regiment of Foot

- 1751–1756: Lt-Gen. Alexander Duroure
- 1756–1760: Maj-Gen. Sir James Ross, Bt.
- 1760–1761: Maj-Gen. David Watson
- 1761–1762: Maj-Gen. Andrew Robinson
- 1762–1766: Maj-Gen. Hon. Sharrington Talbot
- 1766–1775: Lt-Gen. Cadwallader Blayney, 9th Baron Blayney
- 1775–1796: Gen. Sir Robert Pigot, Bt.

38th (the 1st Staffordshire) Regiment of Foot - (1782)

- 1796–1805: Gen. James Rooke
- 1805–1836: Gen. George James Ludlow, 3rd Earl Ludlow, GCB
- 1836–1836: Maj-Gen. Hon. Sir Charles John Greville, KCB
- 1836–1840: Gen. Sir Henry Pigot, GCMG
- 1840–1843: Lt-Gen. Sir Jasper Nicolls, KCB
- 1843–1862: Gen. Hon. Sir Hugh Arbuthnot, KCB
- 1862–1876: Gen. Sir William Mansfield, 1st Baron Sandhurst, GCB, GCSI
- 1876–1881: Gen. James Pattoun Sparks, CB

== Sources ==
- Freer, Major William J. (1915). The Thirty-Eighth Regiment of Foot, now the First Battalion of the South Staffordshire Regiment (PDF). Harrison & Sons.
