= Operation Dracula =

Operation against the Japanese in Rangoon

Coordinates: 16°51′N 96°10′E

- Part of the Burma campaign of World War II
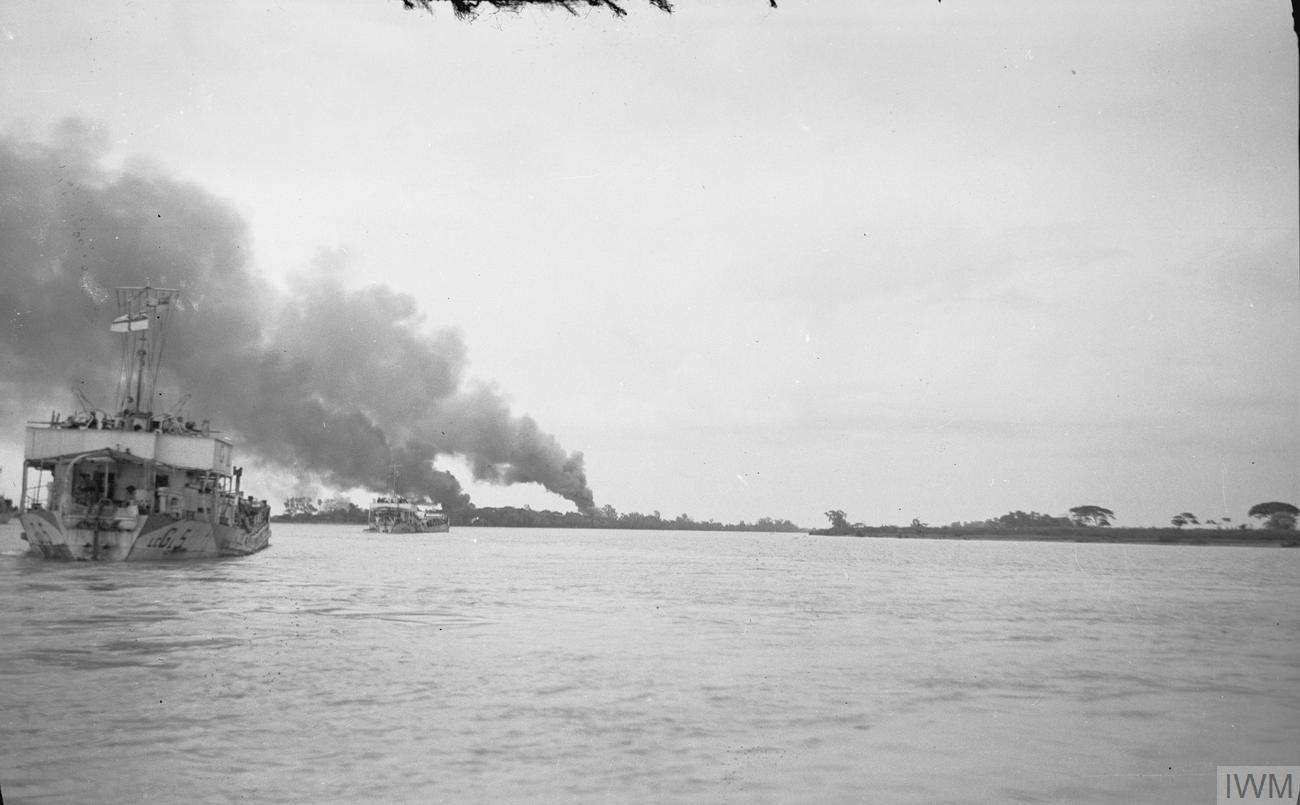
- Landing craft carry troops up the Rangoon River
Date	April – May 1945
Location	Rangoon, Burma
Result	Allied victory

Belligerents
United Kingdom: India; Naval Support: France; Netherlands	Japan

Commanders and leaders
Sir Philip Christison	(Empire of Japan) Unknown

Strength
1 infantry division 1 airborne battalion	Small parties

Casualties and losses
24 (from friendly fire)	30

Operation Dracula was a World War II-airborne and amphibious attack on Rangoon by British and Anglo-Indian forces during the Burma Campaign.

The plan was first proposed in mid-1944 when the Allied South East Asia Command was preparing to reoccupy Burma, but was dropped as the necessary landing craft and other resources were not available. In March 1945 however, it was resurrected, as it was vital to capture Rangoon before the start of the monsoon (which was expected in the second week of May) to secure the lines of communication of the Allied troops in Burma.

During April 1945, units of the British Fourteenth Army advanced to within 40 miles (64 km) of Rangoon, but were delayed until 1 May by an improvised Japanese force which held Pegu. On the same day, as part of Operation Dracula, a composite Gurkha parachute battalion landed on Elephant Point at the mouth of the Rangoon River. Once they had secured the coastal batteries, minesweepers cleared the river of mines. On 2 May, the Indian 26th Division began landing on both banks of the river. The monsoon also broke on this day, earlier than had been expected. However, the Imperial Japanese Army had abandoned Rangoon several days earlier, and the units of the Indian 26th Division occupied the city and its vital docks without opposition. They linked up with Fourteenth Army four days later.

== Background ==
Rangoon was the capital and major port of Burma. In December 1941, Japan entered World War II by attacking United States territory and the Far Eastern colonial possessions of Britain and the Netherlands.

The Japanese bombed Rangoon on 23 December 1941. Refugees began leaving the city, and this increased to a "mass exodus" in February 1942 as the Indian, Anglo-Indian and Anglo-Burmese population of Rangoon fled, fearing both the Japanese and hostile Burmese, leaving the city with no effective administration. After occupying Thailand, the Japanese Army attacked southern Burma in March 1942. The British, Indian and Burmese forces were outmatched and were forced to evacuate Rangoon, making the long-term British defence of Burma impossible, as there were then no proper alternate supply routes overland from India. The British and Chinese forces were compelled to evacuate Burma and retreat into India and China.

There was stalemate for a year. By 1944, the Allied forces in India had been reinforced and had expanded their logistic infrastructure, which made it possible for them to contemplate an attack into Burma. The Japanese attempted to forestall them by an invasion of India, which led to a heavy Japanese defeat at the Battle of Imphal, and other setbacks in Northern Burma. Their losses were to handicap their defence of Burma in the following year.

=== Allied plans ===
In July, 1944, the Allied South East Asia Command began making definite plans for the reconquest of Burma. The Battle of Imphal was still being fought but it was clear that the Japanese would be forced to retreat with heavy casualties.

One of the strategic options examined by South East Asia Command was an amphibious assault on Rangoon. This originally had the working name, Plan Z. (Plan X referred to the recapture of northern Burma only by the American-led Northern Combat Area Command with the limited objective of completing the Ledo Road linking China and India; Plan Y referred to an Allied offensive into Central Burma by the British Fourteenth Army.)

Plan Z, which was to be developed into Operation Dracula, had several advantages. The loss of Rangoon would be even more disastrous for the Japanese in 1945 than it had been for the British in 1942. Not only was it the principal seaport by which the Japanese in Burma received supplies and reinforcements, but it lay very close to their other lines of communication with Thailand and Malaya. An advance by Allied forces north or east from Rangoon of only 40 miles (64 km) to Pegu or across the Sittang River would cut the Burma Railway and several major roads which were the only viable overland links for the Japanese with their forces in these countries. If Rangoon fell, the Japanese would therefore be compelled to withdraw from almost all of Burma, abandoning much of their equipment.

However, the Allied planners considered that to mount an amphibious assault on the scale required would need resources (landing craft, escorting warships, engineering equipment) which would not be available until the campaign in Europe was concluded. (At the time, the Battle of Normandy was being fought, with its outcome still in doubt in some quarters). Operation Dracula was therefore postponed, and Plan Y (now codenamed Operation Capital) was adopted instead.

When sufficient numbers of landing craft and other amphibious resources became available late in 1944, they were first used in operations in the Burmese coastal province of Arakan. Indian XV Corps, under Lieutenant General Sir Philip Christison, captured Akyab Island with its important airfield on 31 December 1944. In late January 1945, Allied troops landed on the Myebon peninsula and inflicted heavy casualties on retreating Japanese troops. Also on 21 January, Allied troops landed unopposed on Cheduba Island, and on Ramree Island which was cleared of Japanese troops only after a severe battle. Airfields were quickly constructed on these islands, allowing Fourteenth Army to be supplied by transport aircraft as it advanced into Central Burma.

=== Dracula reinstated ===
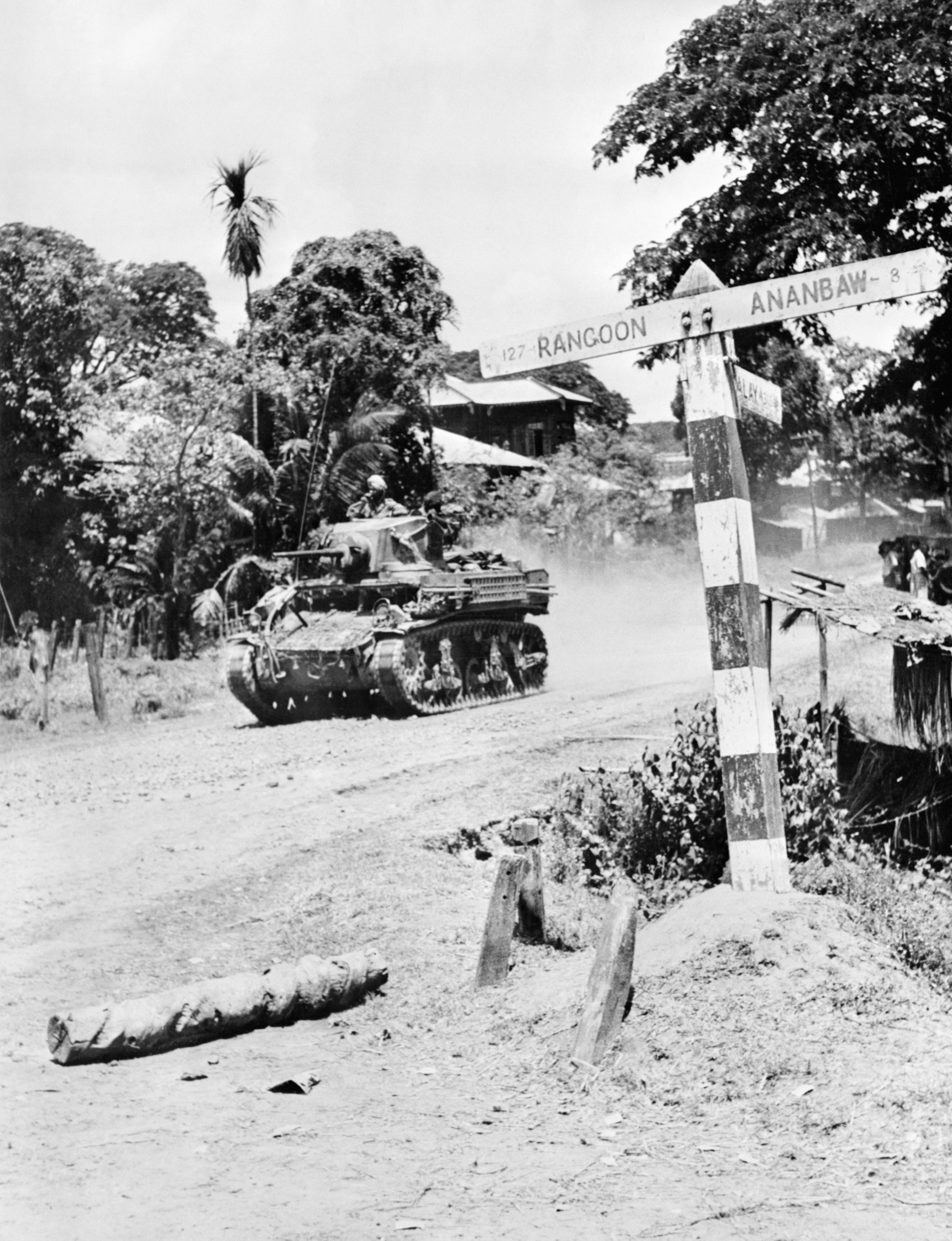
A Stuart light tank of an Indian cavalry regiment during the advance on Rangoon, April 1945

During February and March, 1945, the Fourteenth Army (Lieutenant General William Slim), fought the Battle of Central Burma. The Japanese were severely defeated. Most of their forces were reduced to fractions of their former strength, and were forced to retreat into the Shan States. Slim ordered his forces to exploit their victory by advancing south along the Irrawaddy River and Sittang River valleys towards Rangoon. During April, Indian IV Corps under Lieutenant General Frank Messervy, spearheaded by an armoured brigade, advanced almost 200 miles (320 km) southward. They were approaching Pegu, 40 miles (64 km) north of Rangoon, by the end of the month. Pegu was one of the largest towns in Southern Burma, and was only a few miles north of the roads and railways which linked Rangoon with Thailand and Malaya.

Despite these spectacular successes, Slim was uneasy. Although Messervy and several of his commanders considered there was a sporting chance that they might capture Rangoon at the beginning of May, Fourteenth Army's supply lines were strained to the limit by the rapid advances. The monsoon was imminent, and the heavy rains would make many roads impassable and make resupply by air difficult. It was feared that the Japanese would defend Rangoon to the last man, as they had done elsewhere in the Pacific Theatre, as at Manila in the Philippines. Japanese forces defended the city for a month before they were eliminated. A hundred thousand civilians died during the fighting and the city was left in ruins.

Since Slim's forces would be in a disastrous supply situation if Rangoon was not captured before the monsoon broke, in late March he asked that Operation Dracula be reinstated, to take place before the monsoon began, which was expected in early May. On 2 April, Admiral Louis Mountbatten, the Supreme Commander of South East Asia Command, issued orders for Rangoon to be captured by seaborne invasion not later than 5 May. Before the order was given to reinstate Dracula, South East Asia command had been preparing to attack Phuket Island off the Thai Kra Isthmus, as a stepping stone for an ultimate attack on Singapore. (The operation was codenamed Operation Roger.) The naval and air elements to be allocated to Dracula were therefore already in place. Indian XV Corps HQ was to control the ground forces. As a preliminary for Dracula, IV Corps was ordered to capture the airfields at Toungoo, regardless of cost, so that air cover could be provided for the invasion. The airfields were captured by the Indian 5th Division on 22 April.

== Battle for Rangoon ==
The principal Japanese headquarters in Burma, the Burma Area Army, under Lieutenant General Hyotaro Kimura, was situated in Rangoon. There were no Japanese fighting formations stationed in the city, but there were large numbers of line of communication troops and naval personnel. There was also a substantial contingent of the Indian National Army, a force composed mainly of former Indian prisoners of war captured by the Japanese in Malaya, which sought to overthrow British rule in India. Although some units of the INA had fought tenaciously in the Japanese invasion of India in 1944 and in central Burma, the morale of most of the INA was low by this point in the war. Many of its soldiers were convinced by early 1945 that Japanese defeat was inevitable, and deserted or capitulated readily during the Allied advance on Rangoon.

Kimura had already decided not to defend Rangoon, but to evacuate the city and withdraw to Moulmein in southern Burma. Although he received orders from Field Marshal Hisaichi Terauchi, commander-in-chief of the Southern Expeditionary Army Group, to hold Rangoon to the death, he reasoned that this would involve the senseless destruction of his remaining forces. Kimura was opposed by his chief of staff, Lieutenant General Shinichi Tanaka, who had issued orders to fortify positions in Rangoon. Ba Maw, the Prime Minister of the nominally independent Burmese government, dissuaded the Japanese from turning the Shwedagon Pagoda into a gun emplacement.

However, Tanaka flew north with several senior staff officers on 19 April to review the situation around Toungoo. While he was absent, the remaining staff drew up orders for the evacuation, which Kimura signed unhesitatingly. When Tanaka returned on 23 April, he protested, to no avail. Because the Army HQ's radios had already been moved to Moulmein, the Army could no longer control the overall battle for Burma from Rangoon.

=== Japanese evacuation of Rangoon ===
As the leading British and Indian troops approached Pegu, many of the Japanese rear-area troops in the Rangoon area and even some hastily mobilised Japanese civilians were formed into the Japanese 105th Independent Mixed Brigade under Major General Hideji Matsui, who had recently been appointed commander of the "Rangoon Defence Force". The units of this brigade (also called Kani Force) included anti-aircraft batteries, airfield construction battalions, naval Anchorage Units, the personnel of NCO schools and other odds and ends. They were dispatched north to defend Pegu, although they were delayed by lack of transport (which had been commandeered for Burma Area Army HQ and other units leaving Rangoon) and arrived only piecemeal.

Major General Matsui was also angered by the evacuation of Rangoon, as he had not been informed of it before finding that Kimura's headquarters had been hastily abandoned on 26 April. After making unsuccessful attempts to evacuate Allied prisoners of war unable to walk and to demolish the port installations, Matsui then went north to conduct the defence of Pegu.

Many Japanese troops left Rangoon by sea, and nine out of eleven ships of a convoy carrying a thousand soldiers fell victim to British destroyers in the Gulf of Martaban on April 30. Kimura himself left by airplane. Most of Kimura's HQ and the establishments of Ba Maw and Subhas Chandra Bose (commander of the Indian National Army), left overland, covered by the action of Matsui's troops at Pegu, but were attacked several times by Allied aircraft. The Japanese failed to provide transport for Ba Maw's staff, most of whom had to walk to Moulmein. Ba Maw himself began his journey by car accompanied by his wife and his pregnant daughter, who gave birth at Kyaikto, 16 miles (26 km) east of the Sittang. He feared that he would be assassinated if he went to Moulmein and instead fled to Tokyo. Bose regarded Ba Maw's flight as dishonourable, and marched on foot with his rearmost troops, having first arranged for lorries to evacuate a women's unit, the Rani of Jhansi Regiment.

The only personnel remaining in Rangoon were 5,000 troops of the Indian National Army under Major General A. D. Loganathan, left by Bose to protect the remaining Indian community against attacks by lawless Burmese. Loganathan had no intention of resisting Allied attacks, and intended to hand over his men and responsibility for the city to the British when they arrived.

=== Battle for Pegu ===
While this evacuation was proceeding, the leading British and Indian troops of IV Corps (the Indian 17th Division, commanded by Major General David Tennant Cowan, with the bulk of 255th Indian Tank Brigade under command), were approaching Pegu. Messervy's leading armoured troops first met resistance from Matsui's forces on 27 April. Matsui had sent a detachment (mainly of mixed line of communication troops, but also including 138 Battalion of 24 Independent Mixed Brigade) forward to defend Payagyi, a few miles north of Pegu. Matsui's engineers laid mines (including some improvised from aerial bombs) and booby-trapped obstacles to delay the British tanks. Even more delay was imposed by torrential rain which fell on 28 April, which turned dusty tracks into mud and caused streams and rivers to rise in spate.

On 28 April, the advancing troops of IV Corps cut the road between Pegu and the Sittang River, thus finally cutting the Japanese communications between Rangoon and Moulmein. A small Japanese truck convoy which ran into the road block was wiped out.

The Indian 17th Division cleared Payagyi and several surrounding villages on 29 April. They launched their main attack on Pegu on 30 April. The Japanese held the western part of Pegu, and demolished all the bridges across the Pegu River which separated their positions from the eastern part of the town. Reservoirs and flooded fields prevented the Indian Division making any outflanking moves. Indian infantry (4/12th Frontier Force Regiment) scrambled across the girders of two demolished railway bridges which remained partially intact to establish precarious bridgeheads on the west bank, protected by artillery and tank fire. The 1/10 Gurkhas and 7/10th Baluch Regiment met strong resistance near the main road bridge. The 1/3 Gorkha Rifles and 4/4 Bombay Grenadiers also made little progress while a deep ditch held up the tanks of the 9th Royal Deccan Horse.

However, on the morning of 1 May, Indian patrols found that the Japanese had withdrawn. The 17th Division rapidly bridged the Pegu River and resumed its advance, but the monsoon had already broken. Within hours, the countryside was flooded, and the advance was slowed to a crawl. Slim immediately put all of IV Corps on half rations to help the supply lines.

On 30 April, Matsui had received another order from Kimura, now in Moulmein, to abandon Pegu and return to defend Rangoon to the death. Although he could have continued to resist in Pegu for some days if necessary, he accordingly withdrew. As his force did so, they came under attack as they moved along the exposed road to Hlegu. Matsui ordered a retreat into the hills west of Pegu.

== Dracula launched ==
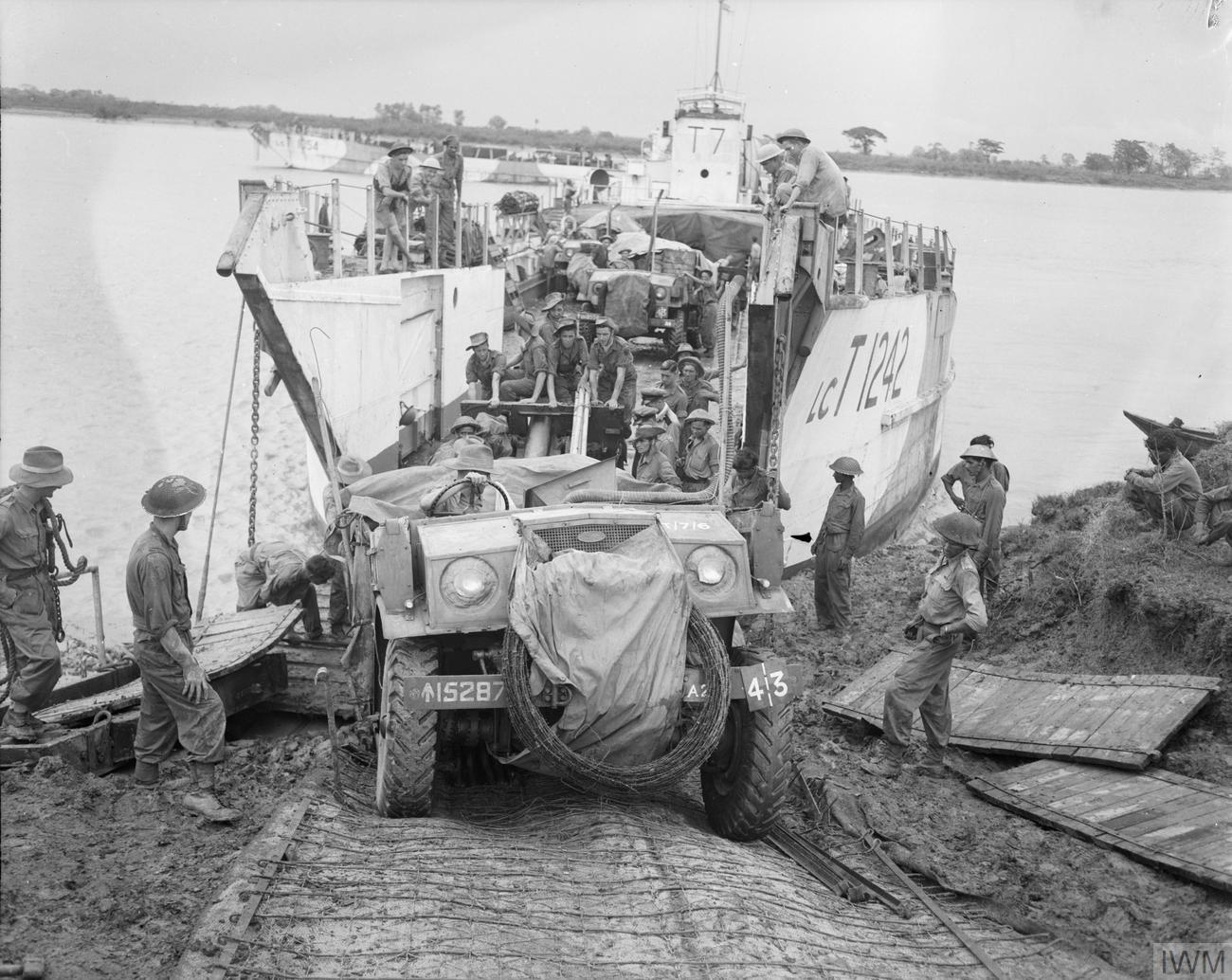
A field gun is bought ashore at Elephant Point, 2 May 1945.

Although the British knew by 24 April from Signals intelligence that Burma Area Army HQ had left Rangoon, they were not aware that the Japanese were about to abandon the city entirely. It was believed that the landings would meet strong resistance. Under the modified plan for Dracula, the Indian 26th Division under Major General Henry Chambers would establish beachheads on both banks of the Rangoon River. The British 2nd Division would follow up through these beachheads several days later to launch the main assault on the city.

The Indian 26th Division and other forces sailed in six convoys from Akyab and Ramree Island between 27 April and 30 April. The transporting and landing of British and Indian assault forces was entrusted to Rear-Admiral Benjamin Martin commanding Force W. The naval covering force included the 21st Aircraft Carrier Squadron commanded by Commodore Geoffrey Oliver consisted of four escort carriers, two cruisers and four destroyers, and the 3rd Battle Squadron, commanded by Vice Admiral Harold Walker, consisting of two battleships (HMS Queen Elizabeth and the Free French battleship Richelieu), two escort carriers, four cruisers (one Dutch) and six destroyers. The 3rd Battle Squadron carried out a diversionary bombardment against Car Nicobar and Port Blair in the Nicobar and Andaman island groups Another flotilla of five destroyers was responsible for the destruction of the main Japanese evacuation convoy. 224 Group Royal Air Force, under Air Vice Marshal the Earl of Bandon, covered the landings from the airfields around Toungoo and on Ramree Island.

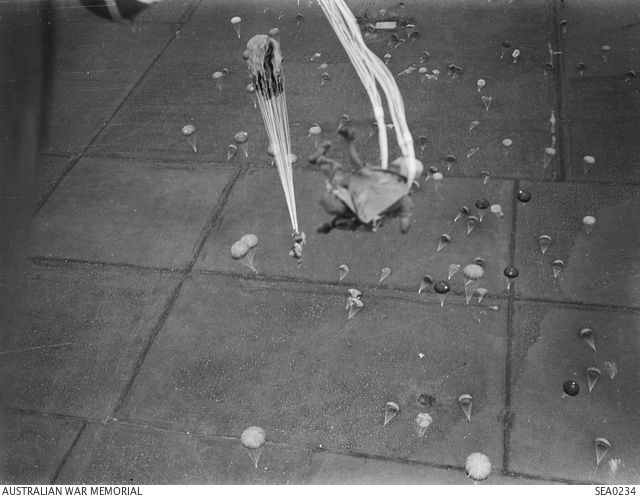
Indian paratroops jumping over Rangoon, Burma, 1945.

Early on 1 May, eight squadrons of B-24 Liberator and four of B-25 Mitchells, and two squadrons of P-51 Mustangs from the 2nd Air Commando Group United States Army Air Forces (USAAF) bombed and strafed Japanese defences south of Rangoon. An air force observation post, a small detachment from Force 136 and a 700-man strong Gurkha composite parachute battalion from the 50th Indian Parachute Brigade were dropped from C-47s of the 2nd Air Commando Group on Elephant Point at the mouth of the Rangoon River in the middle of the morning. They eliminated some small Japanese parties, either left as rearguards or perhaps forgotten in the confusion of the evacuation and captured or destroyed several guns overlooking the sea approaches to Rangoon, suffering thirty casualties from inaccurate Allied bombing.

Once Elephant Point was secured, minesweepers cleared a passage up the river, and landing craft began coming ashore in the early hours of the morning of 2 May, almost the last day on which beach landings were possible before the heavy swell caused by the monsoon became too bad. An Allied Mosquito reconnaissance aircraft flying over Rangoon saw no sign of the Japanese in the city and also noticed a message painted on the roof of the jail by released British prisoners of war. It read, Japs gone. Extract digit – RAF slang for "get on with it". The prison had been taken over by Wing Commander Lionel Hudson, who was leading the former inmates in preparatory efforts for the British advance. Boldly, the crew of the plane tried to land at Mingaladon Airfield but damaged their tailwheel on the potholed runway preventing them taking off again. They walked to the jail, where they found 1,000 former prisoners of war who informed them of the Japanese evacuation. The air crew then went to the docks, where they commandeered a sampan and sailed it down the river to meet the landing craft.

== Aftermath ==
The troops of the Indian 26th Division began occupying the city without opposition on 2 May. The British were joyfully welcomed, perhaps not universally as liberators, but certainly as they could restore order and bring in food and other assistance. When the Japanese and Ba Maw's officials left Rangoon, widespread looting and lawlessness had broken out and continued for several days. The retreating Japanese had burned down the jail housing Burmese prisoners. They had also destroyed St. Philomena's Convent, which had been used as a hospital, killing 400 of their own men. After three years of war and deprivation, the city was deep in filth, many of the population had fled to escape the Kempeitai (Japanese military police) and those remaining were in rags. Dacoits (armed bandits) plagued the outskirts and various infectious diseases were rife.

Units of the 26th Division moved out along the main roads to link up with Fourteenth Army. On 6 May, they met the leading troops of 17th Division, pushing their way through floods southwards from Pegu, at Hlegu 28 miles (45 km) north east of Rangoon. Fourteenth Army and the other Allied forces in Burma thus had a secure line of communication.

Matsui's Kani Force joined the remnants of the Japanese Twenty-Eighth Army in the Pegu Yomas. During July, these forces tried to break out eastwards to join the other Japanese armies east of the Sittang. Matsui's men suffered slightly lighter casualties in this costly operation than most of the other Japanese units involved. However, the naval personnel in Matsui's force broke out separately from the main body and several days later, which allowed Allied units to concentrate against them. They were effectively wiped out, only a handful surviving.

== Sources ==
- Allen, Louis (1986). Burma: the Longest War 1941–45. J. M. Dent and Sons. ISBN 0-460-02474-4.
- Bayly, Christopher; Harper, Tim (2004). Forgotten Armies: Britain's Asian Empire & the War with Japan. London: Penguin History. ISBN 0-14-029331-0.
- Hudson, Lionel (1987). The Rats of Rangoon. Leo Cooper.
- Latimer, Jon (2004). Burma: The Forgotten War. John Murray. ISBN 978-0-7195-6576-2.
- Slim, W. (1956). Defeat into Victory. London: Cassell. OCLC 464081360.
- Y'Blood, William (2008). Air Commandos Against Japan. Naval Institute Press. ISBN 978-1-59114-993-4.
