= Charles Elmhirst =

English cricketer and British Army officer

Lieutenant-General Charles Elmhirst CB
- Born: 25 October 1815; Holton cum Beckering, Lincolnshire, England
- Died: 14 December 1893 (aged 78); West Ashby, Lincolnshire, England
- Military career
- Allegiance: United Kingdom
- Branch: British Army
- Service years: 1834–1893
- Rank: Lieutenant-General
- Commands: Mysore Division (1875)
- Conflicts: Crimean War
- Awards: Order of the Bath

Lieutenant-General Charles Elmhirst CB (25 October 1815 – 14 December 1893) was a British Army officer and an English first-class cricketer.

== Life and military career ==
Elmhirst was born in October 1815 at Holton cum Beckering, Lincolnshire. He purchased a commission into the 9th Regiment of Foot as an ensign in August 1835, and was promoted to lieutenant, again by purchase, in October 1837. Elmhirst served in the First Anglo-Afghan War, and was mentioned in despatches for recapturing a British gun during the expedition to Kohistan. He purchased promotion to captain in January 1846. An amateur cricketer, he made a single appearance in first-class cricket for Manchester against Sheffield at Hyde Park in 1848. Batting twice in the match, he was dismissed without scoring by Richard Skelton in Manchester's first-innings, while in their second-innings he made 45 runs before being dismissed by James Burbeary, sharing in a partnership of 109 with Edward Martin.

He purchased the rank of major in June 1852, before serving in the Crimean War, during which he was promoted to lieutenant colonel without purchase in March 1855. He was decorated with the Legion of Honour by France in May 1857 and with the Order of the Medjidie by the Ottoman Empire in March 1858. He served as he Deputy-Quartermaster General at the Cape of Good Hope, with this posting expiring in April 1870. The following year he was promoted to major-general, while in the 1873 Birthday Honours he was appointed to the Order of the Bath. Elmhirst was the commanding officer for military forces in the Mysore Division in 1875. He was promoted to lieutenant-general in October 1877.

Elmhirst was appointed as the regimental colonel of the South Staffordshire Regiment in September 1881, a role he held for over ten years, before serving in the same capacity with the Royal Norfolk Regiment in September 1893. Two months after his appointment, Elmhirst died at West Ashby, Lincolnshire. He was survived by wife, Frances Dorothea Hunt, whom he had married at County Limerick in 1861. He was also survived by their three children.
