= Easten =

Easten is a surname. Notable people with the surname include:

- Donald Easten (1918–2017), British Army officer of the Royal West Kents who was awarded the Military Cross
- Miranda Easten, country musician from New Zealand

== See also ==
- Easton (surname)
