= John Harman (British Army soldier) =

Recipient of the Victoria Cross

John Pennington Harman
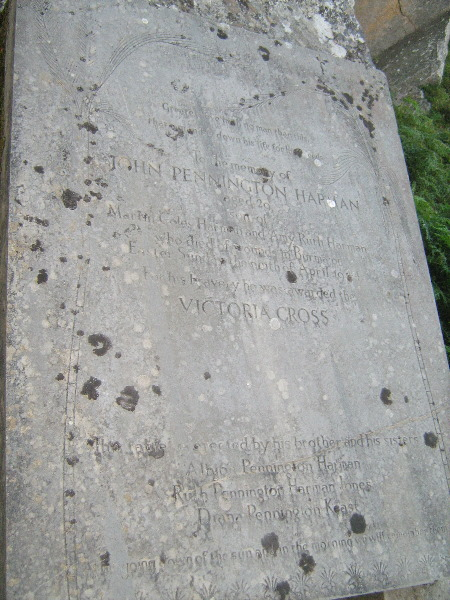
- Born: 20 July 1914; Beckenham, London, England
- Died: 9 April 1944 (aged 29); Kohima, British India
- Burial place: Kohima War Cemetery, British India
- Relatives: Martin Coles Harman (father)
- Military career
- Allegiance: United Kingdom
- Branch: British Army
- Service years: 1941–1944
- Rank: Lance Corporal
- Service number: 295822
- Units: Queen's Own Royal West Kent Regiment
- Conflicts: World War II: Pacific War; Burma campaign; Burma campaign 1944; Operation U-Go; Battle of Kohima (DOW)
- Awards: Victoria Cross

Lance Corporal John Pennington Harman VC (20 July 1914 – 9 April 1944) was a British Army soldier and an English recipient of the Victoria Cross (VC), the highest and most prestigious award for gallantry in the face of the enemy that can be awarded to British and Commonwealth forces.

His was one of three VC's awarded for action in India during World War II, the others being awarded to John Niel Randle (also at the Battle of Kohima) and Abdul Hafiz (VC) at the Battle of Imphal.

== Early life and education ==
John Harman was the son of millionaire Martin Coles Harman, owner of Lundy Island, and followed his father's interest in natural history.

Harman was educated at Bedales School and Clifton College.

== Details ==
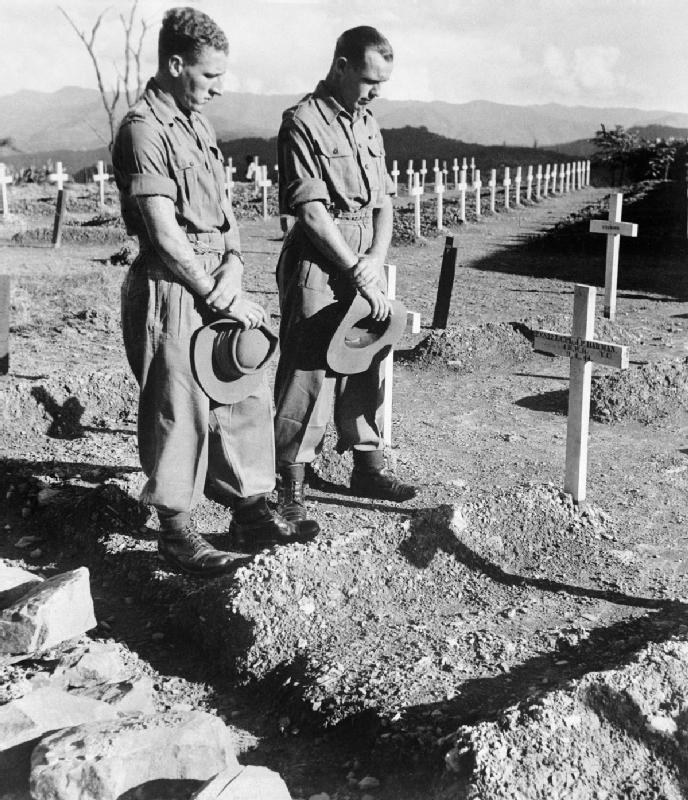
Two soldiers visit the Military Cemetery at Kohima to pay their respects to their former comrade Lance Corporal John Harman VC, 1945

In 1935, Harman applied for a commission in the Royal Air Force, but was turned down for lack of qualifications in mathematics. He would later join the Army in 1941 as a private.

Harman was 29 years old, and a lance-corporal in the 4th Battalion, Queen's Own Royal West Kent Regiment, British Army during the Second World War when the following deed took place for which he was posthumously awarded the Victoria Cross.

On 8/9 April 1944 at the Battle of Kohima, British India, Lance-Corporal Harman was commanding a section of a forward platoon where soldiers of the Imperial Japanese Army had established a machine-gun post within 50 yards [45 m] of his company and were becoming a menace. Since it was not possible to bring fire on to the enemy post the lance-corporal went forward by himself and threw a grenade into the position, destroying it. He returned carrying the enemy machinegun as a trophy. Early next morning, having ordered covering fire from his Bren gun team, he went out alone, with a Lee–Enfield rifle with fixed bayonet and charged a party of Japanese soldiers who were digging in. He shot four and bayoneted one. On his way back, Lance Corporal Harman was severely wounded by a burst of enemy machine-gun fire and died soon after reaching British lines.

Having been shot, Harman was recovered to the nearest trench by his company commander, Captain Donald Easten, and died in his arms. His final words were "I got the lot" referring to the party of Japanese soldiers. A plaque is displayed on the house where he was born in Shrewsbury Road, Beckenham, located in the London Borough of Bromley. There is also a memorial to him erected by his father in VC Quarry, on the east side of Lundy Island.

== Medal ==
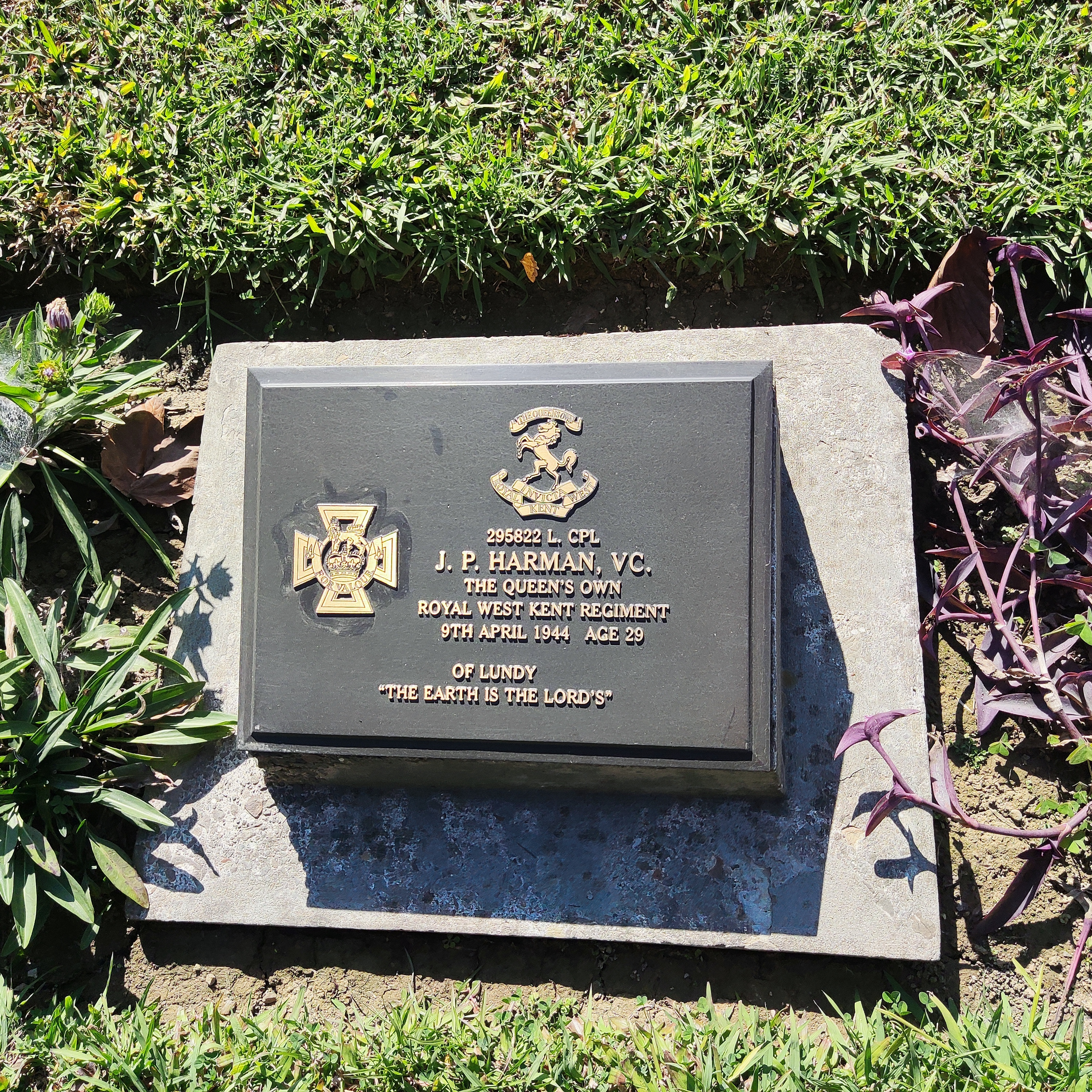
Grave marker in Kohima

His Victoria Cross is displayed at The Queen's Own Royal West Kent Regiment Museum in Maidstone, Kent, England.

== Bibliography ==
- British VCs of World War 2 (John Laffin, 1997)
- Monuments to Courage (David Harvey, 1999)
- Buzzell, Nora, ed. (1997). The Register of the Victoria Cross. Cheltenham, Gloucestershire: This England Alma House. ISBN 0-906324-27-0.
- Ingleton, Roy (2011). Kent VCs. Pen and Sword Books. ISBN 978-1848844094.
