= Lundy Pony =

Breed of pony

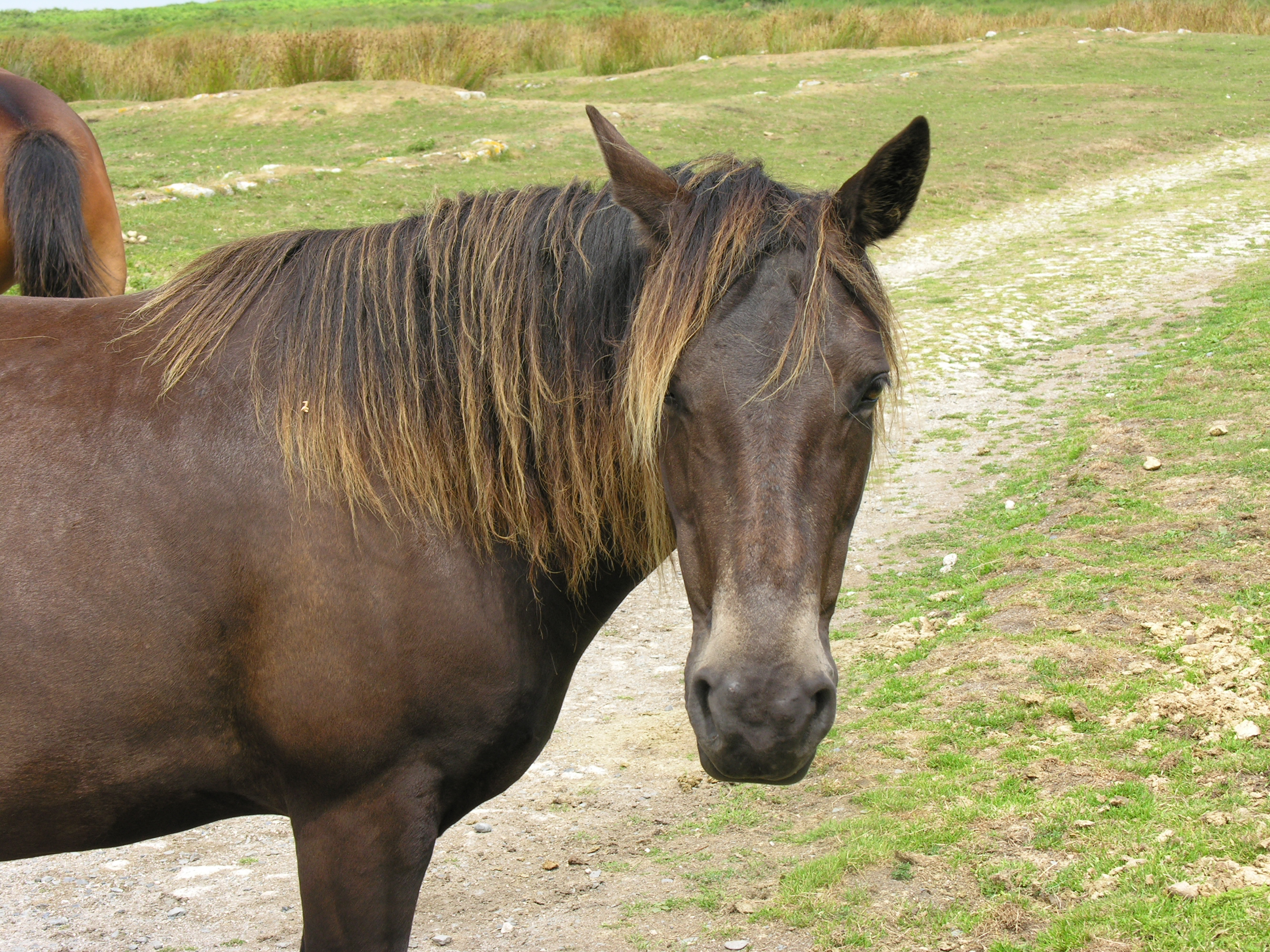
- Conservation status: FAO (2007): no data; DAD-IS (2022): unknown
- Country of origin: United Kingdom

Traits
- Height: 137 cm
- Colour: Usually cream, dun or bay; also chestnut, dark bay, palomino or roan

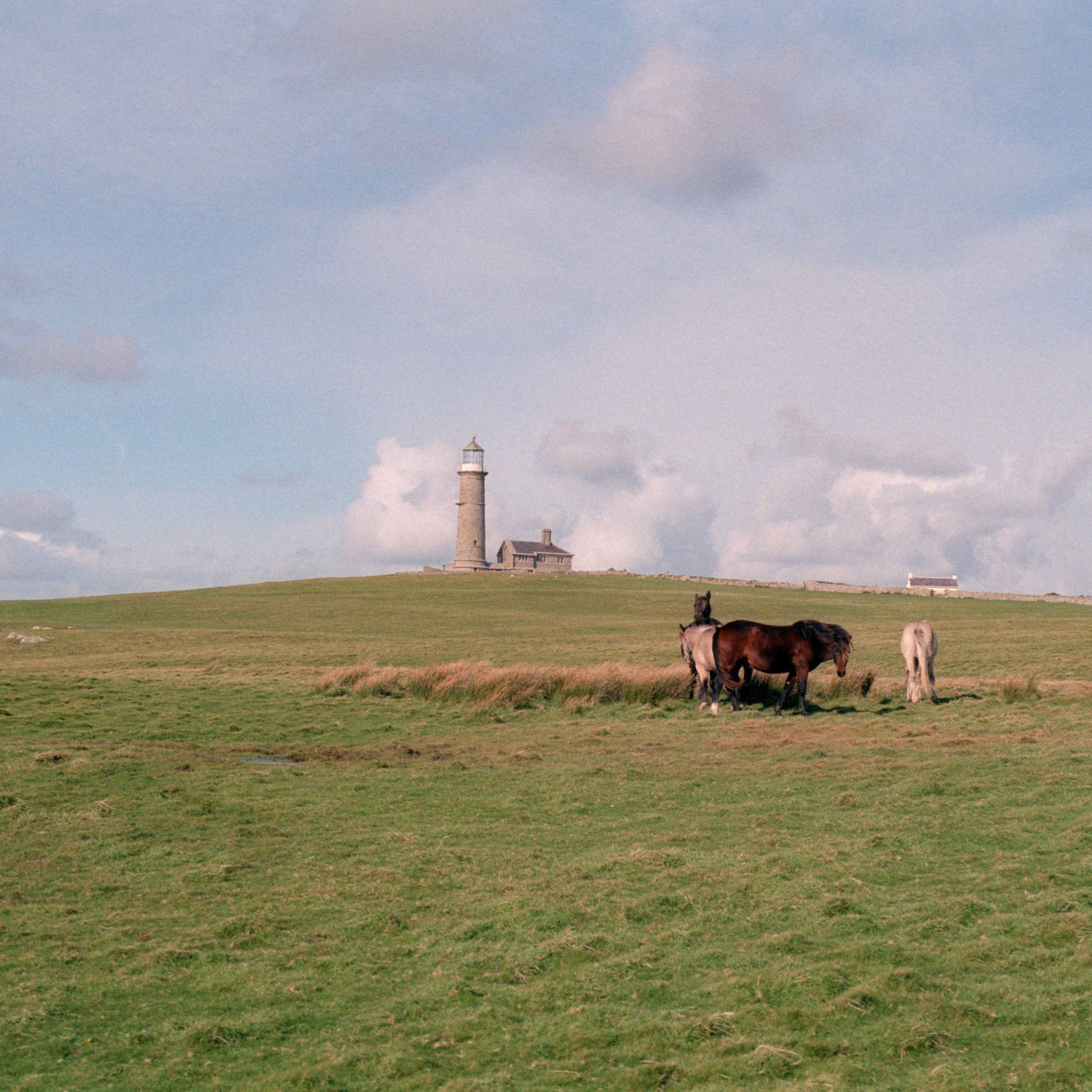
On Lundy Island

The Lundy Pony is a British breed of pony bred on Lundy Island in the twentieth century.

== History ==
In 1928 Martin Coles Harman, who was the owner of Lundy Island, shipped a small herd of ponies to the island, where they lived and bred under semi-feral conditions; most were of New Forest stock. Stallions of the Welsh and Connemara breeds were later added to the herd, as were some further New Forest stallions.

In 1972, following a visit to the island by the chairman of the National Pony Society, a process of breed recognition was begun. A brand was registered with the society and a Foundation Stock Register was started. There were at that time twenty-seven horses on the island – a stallion, eighteen mares and eight foals; the majority displayed characteristics typical of the Connemara.

In 1980 the herd was moved to Cornwall and North Devon in south-west England. A breed society, the Lundy Pony Breed Society, was established in 1974. A population of approximately twenty mares and foals is maintained on the island, replenished by stock from the mainland.

The conservation status of the Lundy Pony is unknown; in 2022 no population data had ever been reported to DAD-IS. It is not among the native British breeds listed on the Equine Watchlist of the Rare Breeds Survival Trust.

== Characteristics ==
The ponies stand some 137 cm at the withers, and are usually cream, dun or bay chestnut, dark bay, palomino and roan may also occur.

== Use ==
The horses are of working hunter pony type, suitable for cross-country riding.
