= Lundy =

English island in the Bristol Channel

- Site of Special Scientific Interest
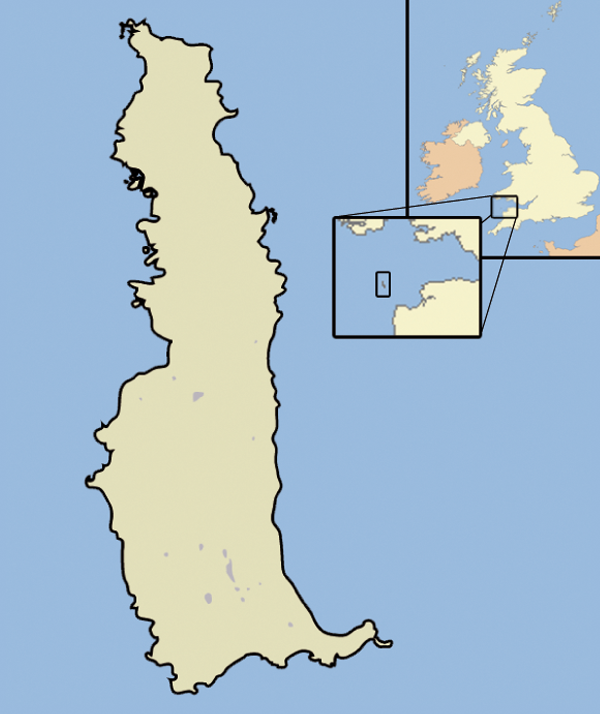

- Location within England
- Location of Lundy.
- Area of search: Devon, England
- Grid reference: SS135460
- Interest: Biological
- Area: 4.45 km^{2} (1.72 sq mi)
- Notification date: 1987

Lundy is an English island in the Bristol Channel. It forms part of the district of Torridge in the county of Devon.

At about 5 km (3 mi) long and 1 km (0.625 mi) wide, Lundy has had a long and turbulent history, frequently changing hands between the British crown and various usurpers. The de Marisco family were the first known owners of Lundy in the 12th century. They recognised the island as an impregnable stronghold and held it despite the crown granting it twice to the Knights Templar. In the 1920s, the island's owner, Martin Harman, tried to issue his own coinage and was fined. In 1941, two German Heinkel He 111 bombers crash-landed on the island, and their crews were captured.

In 1969, Lundy was purchased by British millionaire Jack Hayward, who donated it to the National Trust. It is now managed by the Landmark Trust, a conservation charity that derives its income from day trips and holiday lettings, most visitors arriving by boat from Bideford or Ilfracombe. A local tourist curiosity is the special "Puffin" postage stamp, a collector's item in a category known by philatelists as "local carriage labels".

As a steep, rocky island, often shrouded by fog, Lundy has been the scene of many shipwrecks, and the remains of its old lighthouse installations are of both historic and scientific interest. Its present-day lighthouses, both of which are solar-powered, are fully automated. Lundy has a rich bird life, as it lies on major migration routes, and hosts many vagrant as well as indigenous species. It also contains a variety of marine habitats, with rare seaweeds, sponges and corals. In 2010, the island became Britain's first Marine Conservation Zone.

== Profile ==
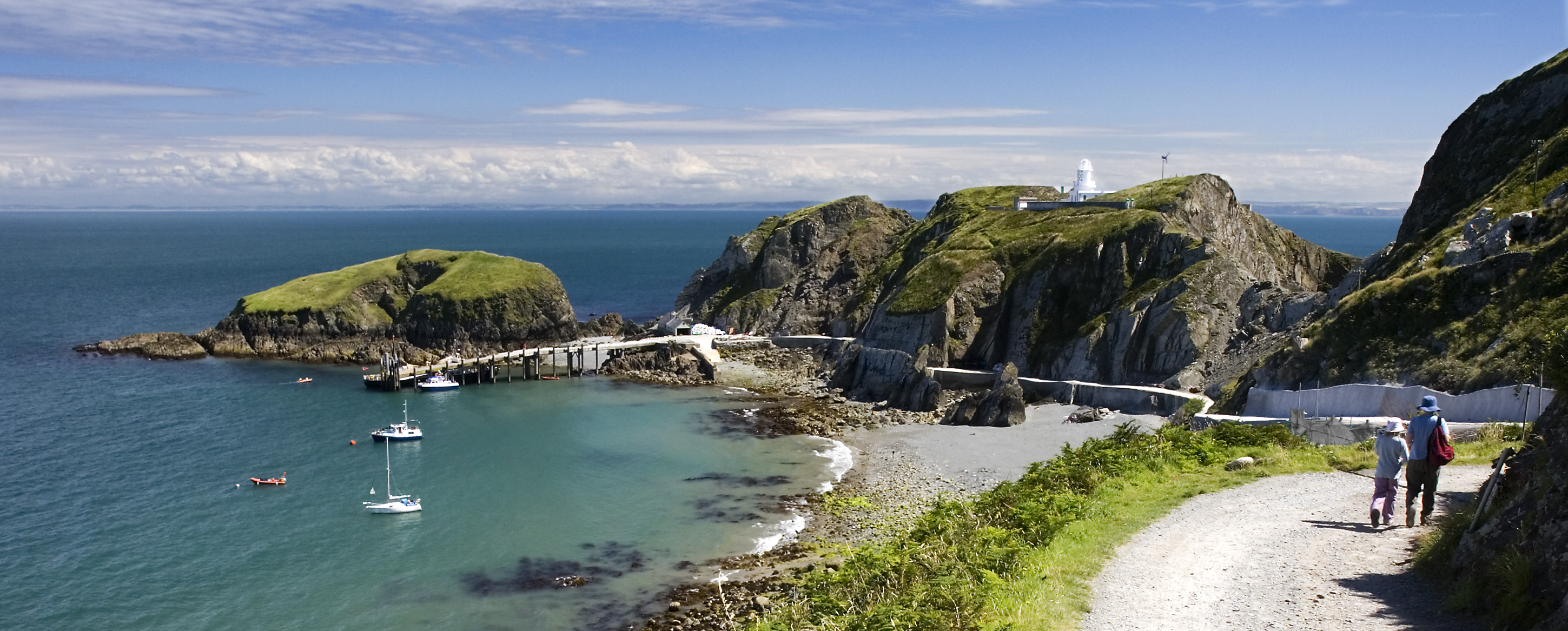
Lundy's jetty and harbour

Lundy is the largest island in the Bristol Channel and lies 19 km (12 mi) off the coast of Devon, about a third of the distance across the channel from Devon to Pembrokeshire. The island is part of the Torridge district in Devon. Lundy gives its name to a British sea area. In 2007, it had a resident population of 28 people. These include a warden, a ranger, an island manager, a farmer, bar and housekeeping staff, and volunteers, most of whom live in and around the village at the south of the island. Visitors include day trippers and holiday makers staying overnight in rental properties or camping.

In a 2005 opinion poll of Radio Times readers, Lundy was named as Britain's tenth greatest natural wonder. The island has been designated a Site of Special Scientific Interest and it was England's first statutory Marine Nature reserve, and the first Marine Conservation Zone, because of its unique flora and fauna. It is managed by the Landmark Trust on behalf of the National Trust.

== Etymology ==
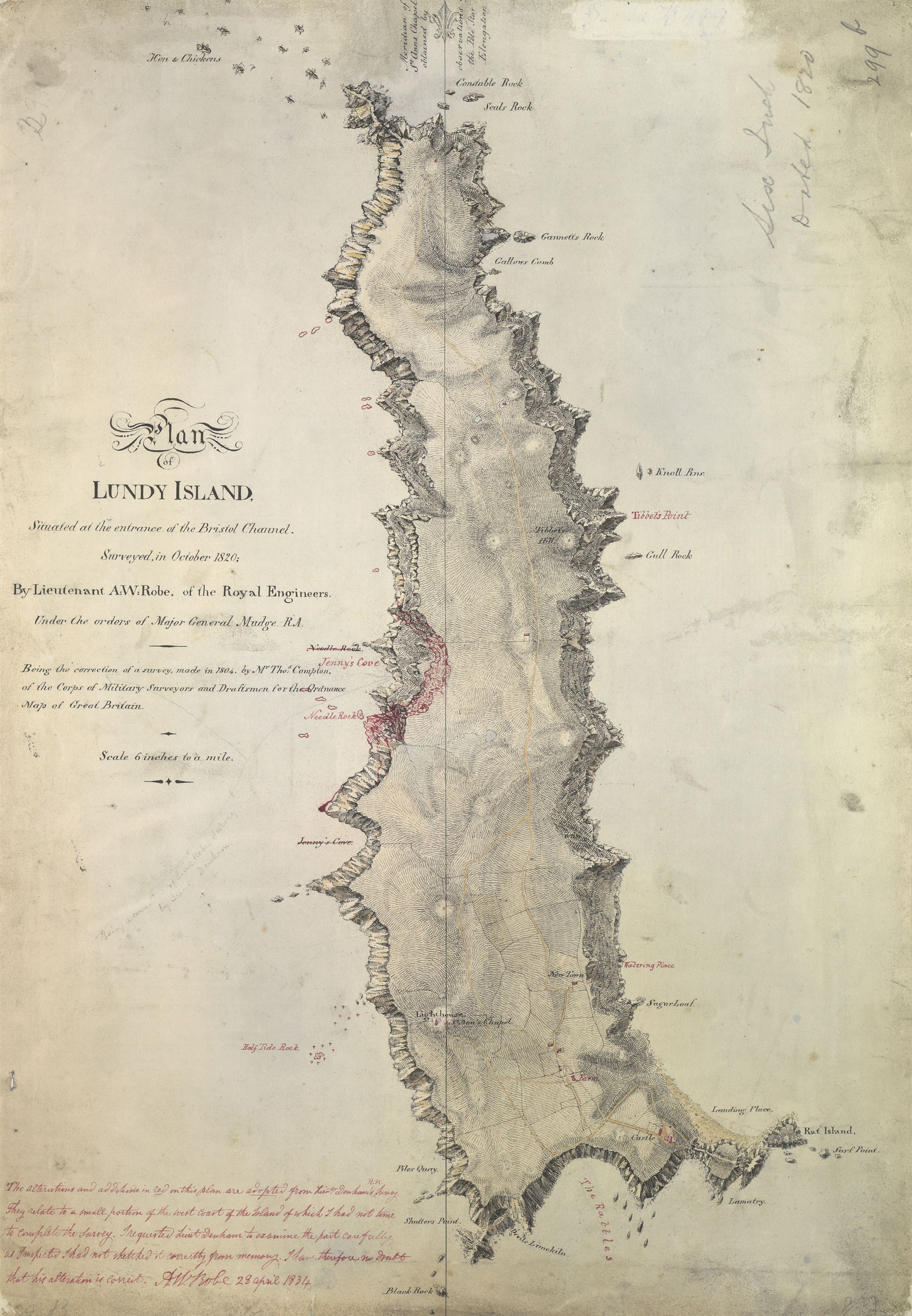
Map by Henry Mangles Denham (1832)

The place-name Lundy is first attested in 1189 in the Records of the Templars in England, where it appears as [Insula de] Lundeia. It appears in the Charter Rolls as Lundeia again in 1199, and as Lunday in 1281. The name is Scandinavian and means 'puffin island', from the Old Norse lundi meaning 'puffin' (compare the three Lundey islands in Iceland); it appears in the 12th-century Orkneyinga saga as Lundey.

Lundy is known in Welsh as Ynys Wair, 'Gwair's Island', in reference to an alternative name for the wizard Gwydion.

== History ==
Lundy has evidence of visitation or occupation from the Mesolithic period onward, with Neolithic flintwork, Bronze Age burial mounds, four inscribed gravestones from the early medieval period, and an early medieval monastery (possibly dedicated to St Elen or St Helen).

=== Beacon Hill Cemetery ===
Sketch of Beacon Hill Cemetery

Beacon Hill Cemetery was excavated by Charles Thomas in 1969. The cemetery contains four inscribed stones, dated to the 5th or 6th century AD. The site was originally enclosed by a curvilinear bank and ditch, which is still visible in the southwest corner; however the other walls were moved when the Old Light was constructed in 1819. Celtic Christian enclosures of this type were common in Western Britain and are known as Llans in Welsh and Lanns in Cornish. There are surviving examples in Luxulyan, in Cornwall; Mathry, Meidrim and Clydau in the south of Wales; and Stowford, Jacobstowe, Lydford and Instow, in Devon.

Thomas proposed the following sequence of site usage:

1. An area of round huts and fields. These huts may have fallen into disuse before the construction of the cemetery.
2. The construction of the focal grave, an 11 by 8 ft (3.4 by 2.4 m) rectangular stone enclosure containing a single cist grave. The interior of the enclosure was filled with small granite pieces. Two more cist graves located to the west of the enclosure may also date from this time.
3. Perhaps 100 years later, the focal grave was opened and the infill removed. The body may have been moved to a church at this time.
4. Two further stages of cist grave construction around the focal grave.

Twenty-three cist graves were found during this excavation. Considering that the excavation only uncovered a small area of the cemetery, there may be as many as 100 graves.

==== Inscribed stones ====
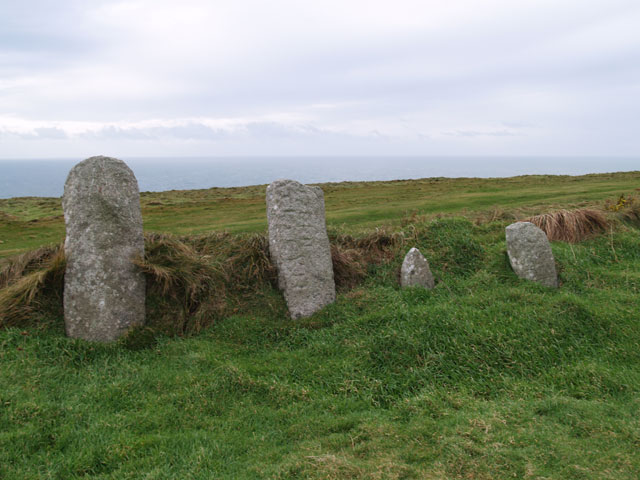
Inscribed stones

Four Celtic inscribed stones have been found in Beacon Hill Cemetery:

- 1400 OPTIMI, or TIMI; the name (or perhaps epithet) Optimus is Latin and male. Discovered in 1962 by D. B. Hague.
- 1401 RESTEVTAE, or RESGEVT[A], Latin, female i.e. Resteuta or Resgeuta. Discovered in 1962 by D. B. Hague.
- 1402 POTIT[I], or [PO]TIT, Latin, male. Discovered in 1961 by K. S. Gardener and A. Langham.
- 1403 --]IGERNI [FIL]I TIGERNI, or—I]GERNI [FILI] [T]I[G]ERNI, Brittonic, male i.e. Tigernus son of Tigernus. Discovered in 1905.

=== Knights Templar ===
Lundy was granted to the Knights Templar by Henry II in 1160. The Templars were a major international maritime force at this time, with interests in North Devon, and almost certainly an important port at Bideford or on the River Taw in Barnstaple. This was probably because of the increasing threat posed by the Norse sea raiders; however, it is unclear whether they ever took possession of the island. Ownership was disputed by the Marisco family who may have already been on the island during King Stephen's reign. The Mariscos were fined, and the island was cut off from necessary supplies. Evidence of the Templars' weak hold on the island came when King John, on his accession in 1199, confirmed the earlier grant.

=== Marisco family ===
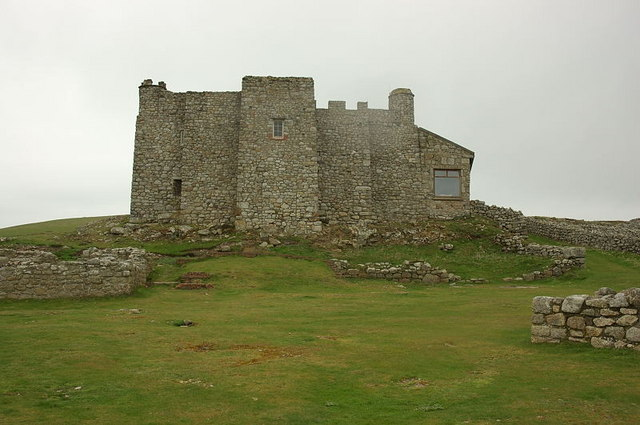
Marisco Castle

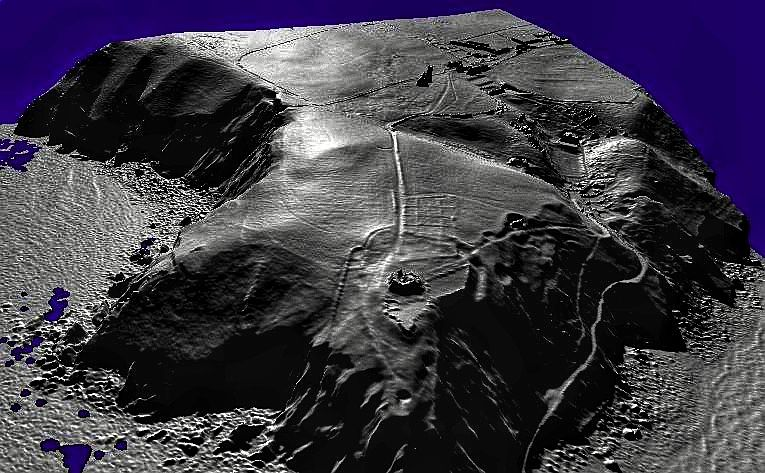
A lidar view of Marisco Castle and associated features

The de Marisco family were a prominent Anglo-Norman family who controlled Lundy between the 12th and 13th centuries. Their tenure was marked by piracy, defiance of royal authority, and ultimately the construction of the island's first castle.

The documented history of Lundy under Norman rule began with the de Newmarch family, who held the island from around 1100. Sometime around 1150, the de Newmarch family leased Lundy to the de Mariscos.

In 1235, William de Marisco was implicated in the murder of Henry Clement, a messenger of Henry III. Three years later, an attempt was made to kill Henry III by a man who later confessed to being an agent of the Marisco family. William de Marisco fled to Lundy where he lived as a virtual king. He built a stronghold in the area now known as Bulls' Paradise with walls 9 feet (3 metres) thick.

In 1242, Henry III sent troops to the island. They scaled the island's cliff and captured William de Marisco and 16 of his "subjects". Henry III built the castle (sometimes referred to as the Marisco Castle) in an attempt to establish the rule of law on the island and its surrounding waters. In 1275, the island is recorded as being in the Lordship of King Edward I but by 1322, it was in the possession of Thomas, 2nd Earl of Lancaster and was among the large number of lands seized by Edward II following Lancaster's execution for rebelling against the King. At some point in the 13th century, the monks of the Cistercian order at Cleeve Abbey in Somerset held the rectory of the island.

=== Piracy ===
Over the next few centuries, the island was hard to govern. Trouble followed as both English and foreign pirates and privateers – including other members of the Marisco family – took control of the island for short periods. Ships were forced to navigate close to Lundy because of the dangerous shingle banks in the fast flowing River Severn and Bristol Channel, with its tidal range of 27 feet (8.2 metres), one of the greatest in the world. This made the island a profitable location from which to prey on passing Bristol-bound merchant ships bringing back valuable goods from overseas.

In 1627, the Salé Rovers, from the Republic of Salé (in modern-day Morocco) occupied Lundy for five years. The Barbary pirates, under the command of the Dutch Muslim Jan Janszoon, flew a Moorish flag over the island. Slaving raids were made embarking from Lundy by the Barbary pirates, and captured Europeans were held on Lundy before being sent to Algiers to be sold as slaves.

From 1628 to 1634, in addition to the Barbary Pirates, the island was plagued by privateers of French, Basque, English and Spanish origin targeting the lucrative shipping routes passing through the Bristol Channel. These incursions were eventually ended by John Penington, but in the 1660s and as late as the 1700s, the island still fell prey to French privateers.

=== Civil war ===
In the English Civil War, Thomas Bushell held Lundy for King Charles I, rebuilding Marisco Castle and garrisoning the island at his own expense. He was a friend of Francis Bacon, a strong supporter of the Royalist cause and an expert on mining and coining. It was the last Royalist territory held between the first and second civil wars. After receiving permission from Charles I, Bushell surrendered the island on 24 February 1647 to Richard Fiennes, representing General Fairfax. In 1656, the island was acquired by Lord Saye and Sele.

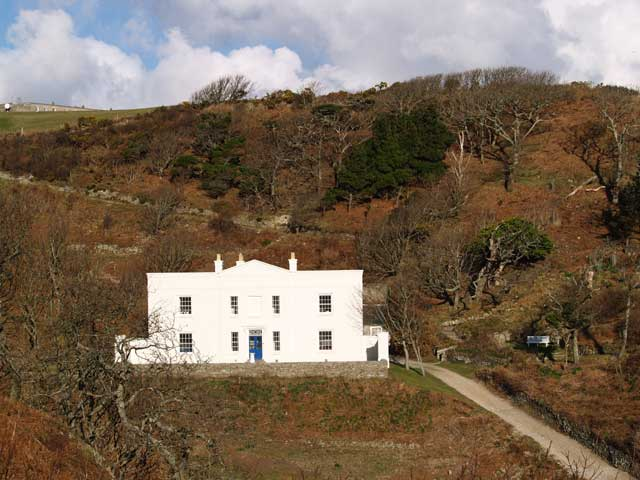
Millcombe House

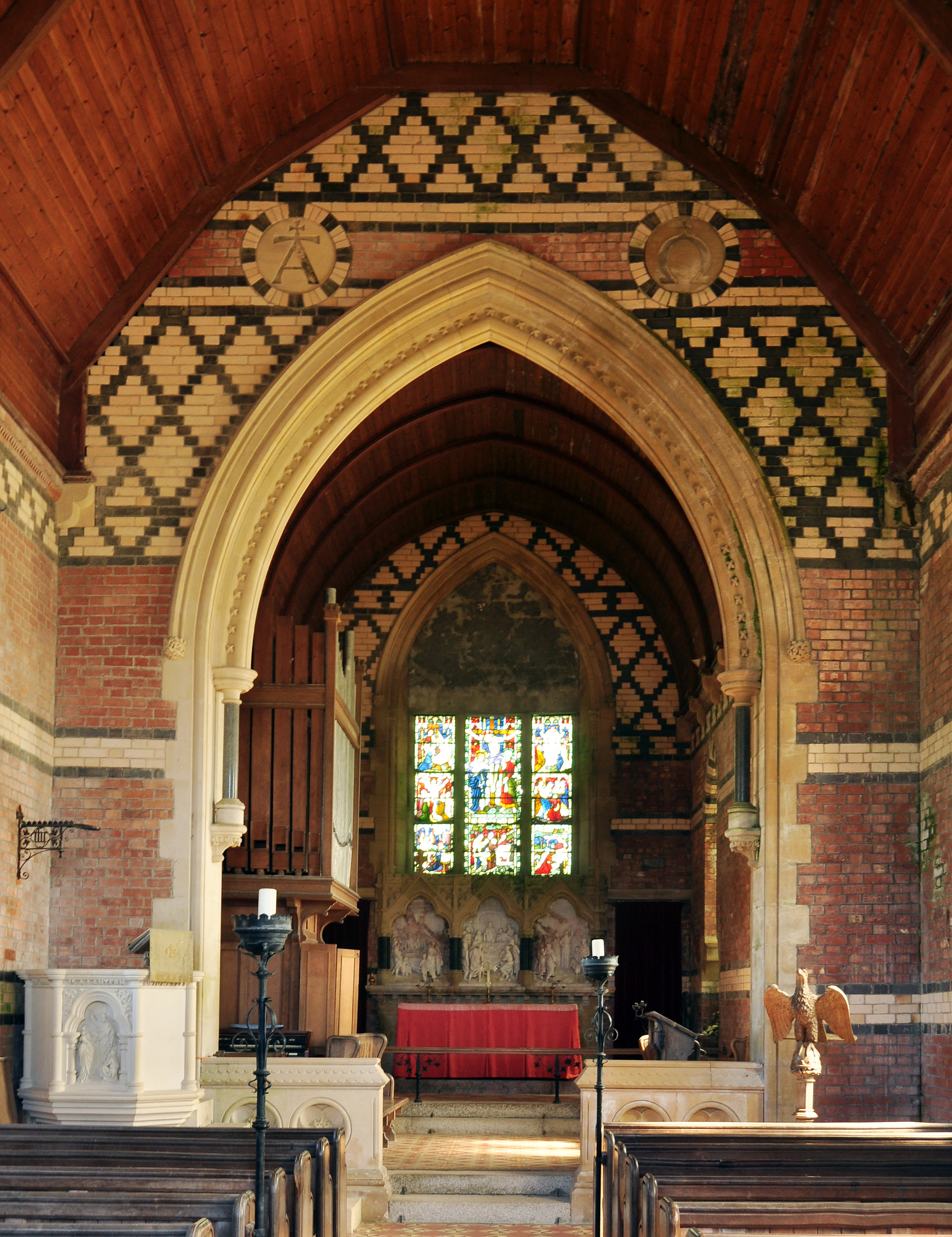
Interior of St. Helen's Church, prior to the east window's restoration in 2018

Exterior of St. Helen's Church, taken prior to the 2018 renovations

Government House, built in 1982

=== 18th and 19th centuries ===
The late 18th and early 19th centuries were years of lawlessness on Lundy, particularly during the ownership of Thomas Benson (1708–1772), a Member of Parliament for Barnstaple in 1747 and Sheriff of Devon, who notoriously used the island for housing convicts whom he was supposed to be deporting. Benson leased Lundy from its owner, John Leveson-Gower, 1st Earl Gower (1694–1754) (who was an heir of the Grenville family of Bideford and of Stowe, Kilkhampton in Cornwall), at a rent of £60 per annum and contracted with the Government to transport a shipload of convicts to Virginia, but diverted the ship to Lundy to use the convicts as his personal slaves. Later Benson was involved in an insurance swindle. He purchased and insured the ship Nightingale and loaded it with a valuable cargo of pewter and linen. Having cleared the port on the mainland, the ship put into Lundy, where the cargo was removed and stored in a cave built by the convicts, before setting sail again. Some days afterwards, when a homeward-bound vessel was sighted, the Nightingale was set on fire and scuttled. The crew were taken off the stricken ship by the other ship, which landed them safely at Clovelly.

Sir Vere Hunt, 1st Baronet of Curragh, a rather eccentric Irish politician and landowner, and unsuccessful man of business, purchased the island from John Cleveland in 1802 for £5,270. Hunt planted in the island a small, self-contained Irish colony with its own constitution and divorce laws, coinage, and stamps. The tenants came from Hunt's Irish estate and they experienced agricultural difficulties while on the island. This led Hunt to seek someone who would take the island off his hands; he failed in his attempt to sell it to the British government as a base for troops.

After the 1st Baronet's death his son, Sir Aubrey (Hunt) de Vere, 2nd Baronet, also had great difficulty in securing any profit from the property. In the 1820s, John Benison agreed to purchase the island for £4,500 but then refused to complete the sale, as he felt that de Vere could not make out a good title in respect of the sale terms, namely that the island was free from tithes and taxes.

William Hudson Heaven purchased Lundy in 1834, as a summer retreat and for hunting, at a cost of 9,400 guineas (£9,870). He claimed it to be a "free island", and successfully resisted the jurisdiction of the mainland magistrates. Lundy was in consequence sometimes referred to as "the kingdom of Heaven". It belonged in law to the county of Devon, and had long been part of the hundred of Braunton. Many of the buildings on the island, including St. Helen's Church, designed by the architect John Norton, and Millcombe House (originally known simply as "the Villa"), date from the Heaven period. The Georgian-style villa was built in 1836. However, the expense of building the road from the beach (no financial assistance being provided by Trinity House, despite their frequent use of the road following the construction of the lighthouses), maintaining the villa, and the general cost of running the island had a ruinous effect on the family's finances, which had been diminished by reduced profits from their sugar plantations, rum production, and livestock rearing in Jamaica.

In 1957, a message in a bottle from one of the seamen of HMS Caledonia was washed ashore between Babbacombe and Peppercombe in Devon. The letter, dated 15 August 1843, read: "Dear Brother, Please e God i be with y against Michaelmas. Prepare y search Lundy for y Jenny ivories. Adiue William, Odessa". The bottle and letter are on display at the Portledge Hotel at Fairy Cross, in Devon, England. Jenny was a three-masted full-rigged ship reputed to be carrying ivory and gold dust that was wrecked on Lundy on 20 January 1797 at a place thereafter called Jenny's Cove. Some ivory was apparently recovered some years later but the leather bags supposed to contain gold dust were never found.

=== 20th and 21st centuries ===
William Heaven was succeeded by his son the Reverend Hudson Grosset Heaven who, thanks to a legacy from Sarah Langworthy (née Heaven), was able to fulfil his life's ambition of building a stone church on the island. St Helen's was completed in 1896, and stands today as a lasting memorial to the Heaven period. It has been designated by English Heritage a Grade II listed building. He is said to have been able to afford either a church or a new harbour. His choice of the church was not however in the best financial interests of the island. The unavailability of the money for re-establishing the family's financial soundness, coupled with disastrous investment and speculation in the early 20th century, caused severe financial hardship.

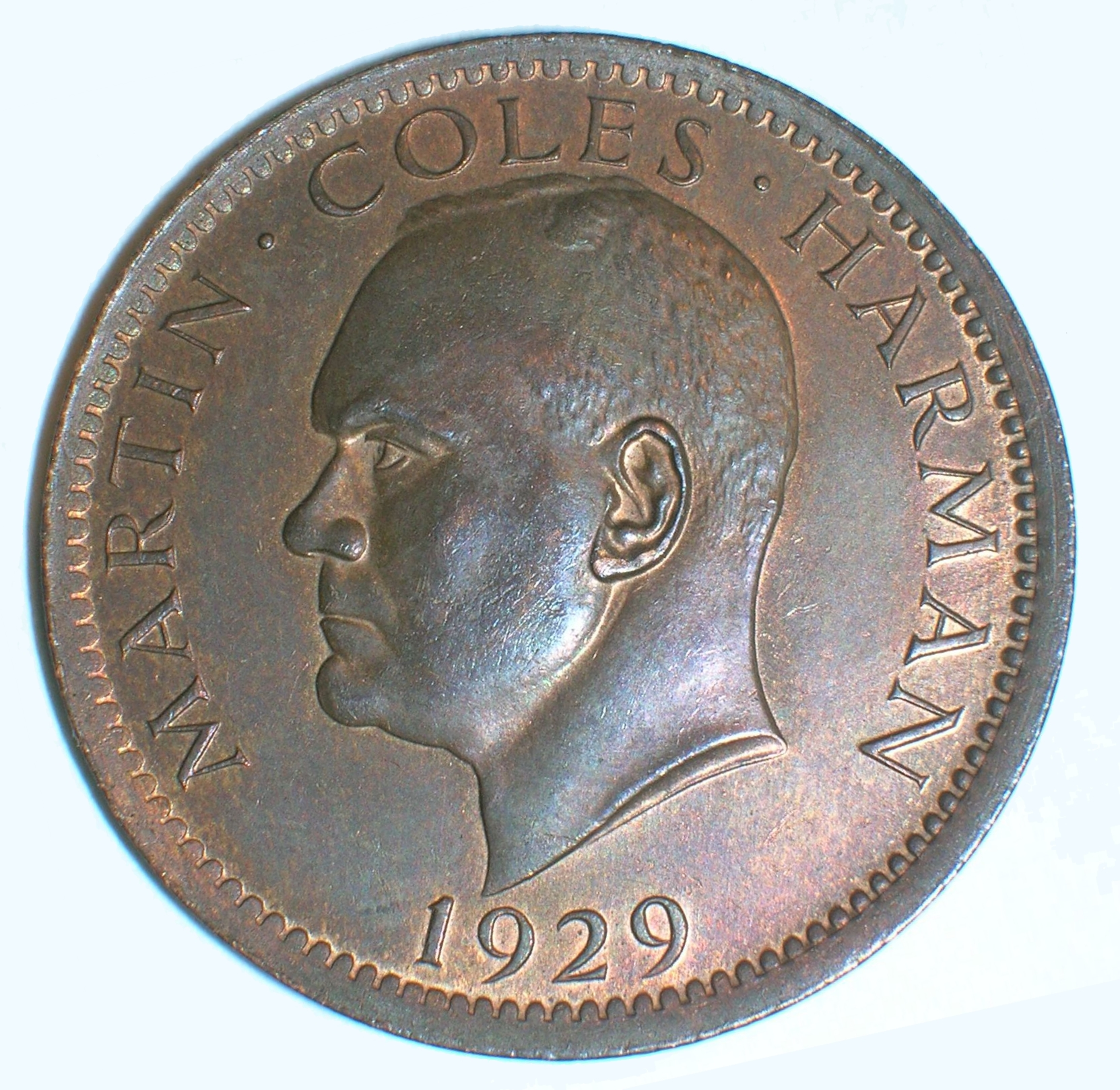
One Puffin coin of 1929, bearing the portrait of Martin Coles Harman

Hudson Heaven died in 1916, and was succeeded by his nephew, Walter Charles Hudson Heaven. With the outbreak of the First World War, matters deteriorated seriously, and in 1918 the family sold Lundy to Augustus Langham Christie. In 1924, the Christie family sold the island along with the mail contract and the MV Lerina to the businessman Martin Coles Harman. Harman issued two coins of Half Puffin and One Puffin denominations in 1929, nominally equivalent to the British halfpenny and penny, resulting in his prosecution under the Coinage Act 1870. His case was heard by Devon magistrates in April 1930, and he was fined £5 and ordered to pay £15/15s costs (equivalent to £283 and £890, respectively, in 2025). He appealed to the King's Bench Division of the High Court of Justice in 1931, but the appeal was dismissed. The coins were withdrawn and became collector's items. In 1965, a "fantasy" restrike four-coin set, a few in gold, was issued to commemorate 40 years since Harman purchased the island. Harman's son, John Pennington Harman was awarded a posthumous Victoria Cross during the Battle of Kohima, India in 1944. There is a memorial to him at the VC Quarry on Lundy. Martin Coles Harman died in 1954.

Residents did not pay taxes to the United Kingdom and had to pass through customs when they travelled to and from Lundy Island. Although the island was ruled as a virtual fiefdom, its owner never claimed to be independent of the United Kingdom, in contrast to later territorial "micronations".

Following the death of Harman's son Albion in 1968, Lundy was put up for sale in 1969. Jack Hayward, a British millionaire, purchased the island for £150,000 (equivalent to £2,180,000 in 2025) and gave it to the National Trust, who leased it to the Landmark Trust. The Landmark Trust has managed the island since then, deriving its income from arranging day trips, letting out holiday cottages and from donations. In May 2015 a sculpture by Antony Gormley was erected on Lundy. It is one of five life-sized sculptures, Land, placed near the centre and at four compass points of the UK in a commission by the Landmark Trust, to celebrate its 50th anniversary. The others are at Lowsonford (Warwickshire), Saddell Bay (Scotland), the Martello Tower (Aldeburgh, Suffolk), and Clavell Tower (Kimmeridge Bay, Dorset).

The island is visited by over 20,000 day trippers a year, but during September 2007, had to be closed for several weeks owing to an outbreak of norovirus.

An inaugural Lundy Island half-marathon took place on 8 July 2018 with 267 competitors.

=== Wrecked ships and aircraft ===
==== Wreck of Jenny ====
Near the end of a voyage from Africa to Bristol, the British merchant ship Jenny was wrecked on the coast of Lundy on 20 January 1797. Only the first mate survived. The site of the tragedy (51°10.87′N 4°40.48′W) has since been known as Jenny's Cove.

==== Wreck of Battleship Montagu ====
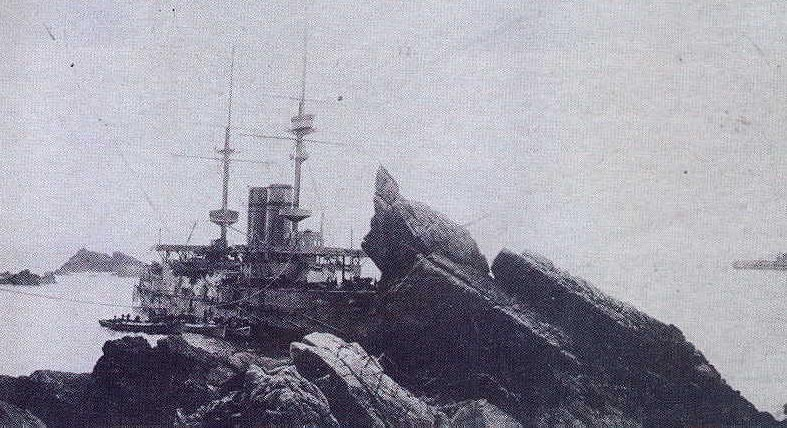
Battleship HMS Montagu aground on Lundy in 1906

On 30 May 1906 the Royal Navy battleship HMS Montagu was sailing in heavy fog when it ran hard aground near Shutter Rock on Lundy's southwest corner at about 2:00 a.m. Thinking they were aground at Hartland Point on the English mainland, a landing party went ashore for help, only finding out where they were after encountering the lighthouse keeper at the island's north light.

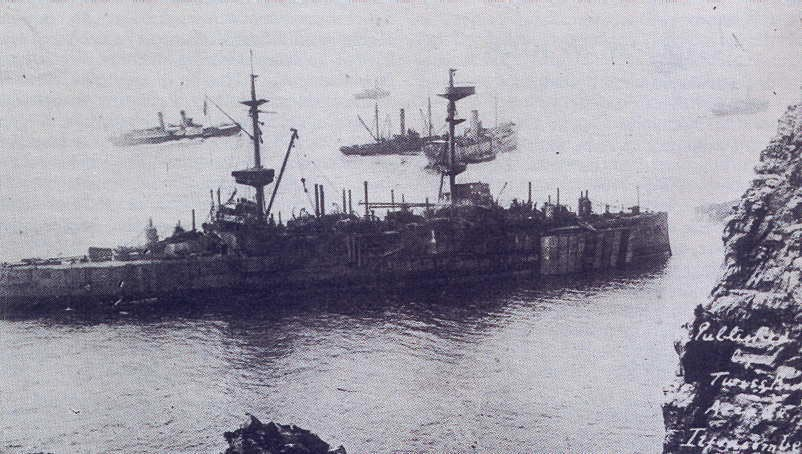
HMS Montagu during the failed salvage attempts of the summer of 1906

Efforts by the Royal Navy to salvage the badly damaged battleship during the summer of 1906 failed, and in 1907 it was decided to give up and sell her for scrap. Montagu was scrapped at the scene over the next fifteen years. Diving clubs still visit the site, where armour plating remains among the rocks and kelp.

==== Remains of a German Heinkel 111H bomber ====
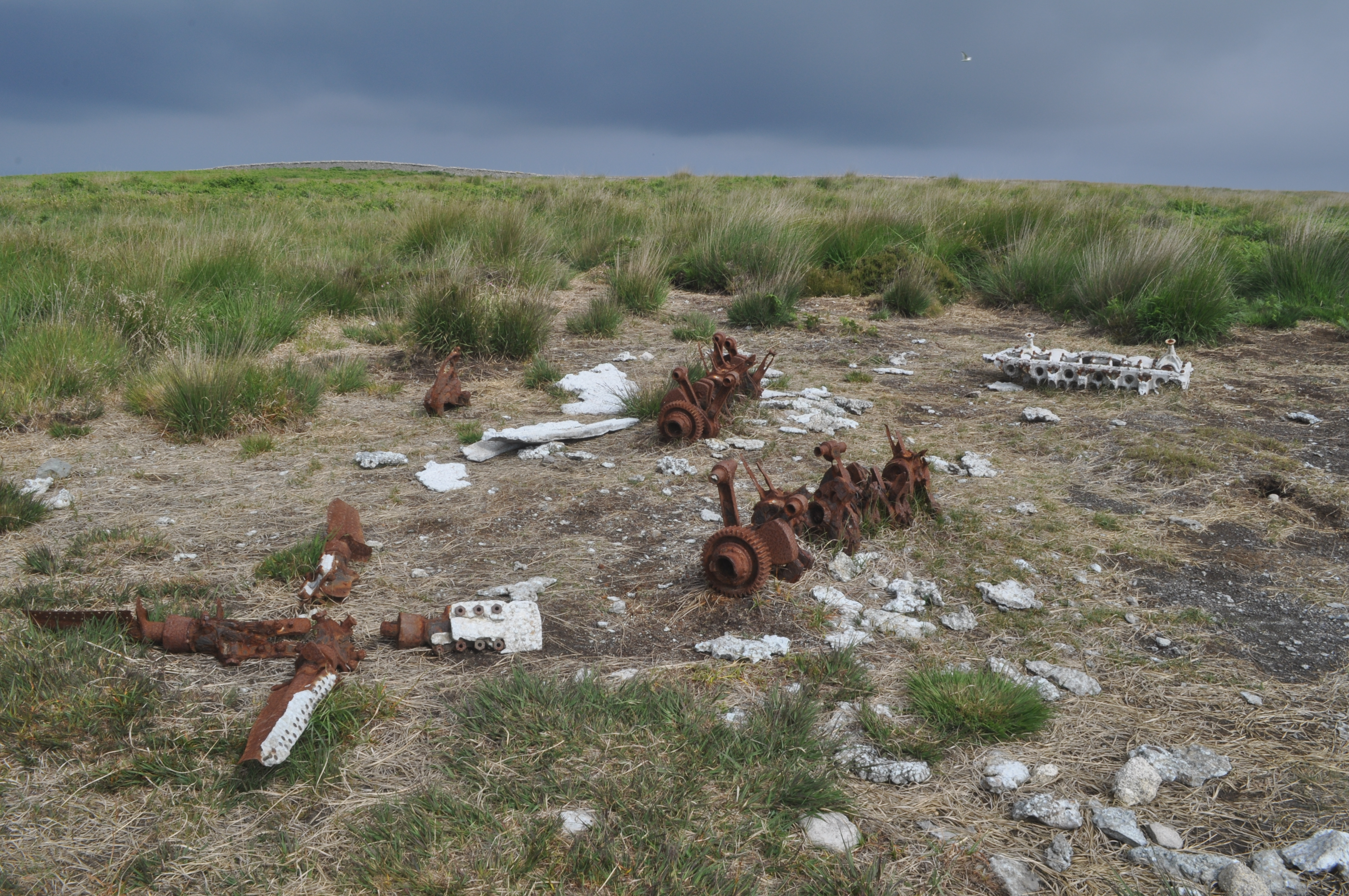
Remains of one of the Heinkels just south of Halfway Wall

During the Second World War two German Heinkel He 111 bombers crash-landed on the island in 1941. The first was on 3 March, when all the crew survived and were taken prisoner.

The second was on 1 April when the pilot was killed and the other crew members were taken prisoner. This plane had bombed a British ship and one engine was damaged by anti aircraft fire, forcing it to crash land. Most of the metal was salvaged, although a few remains can be found at the crash site to date. Reportedly, to avoid reprisals, the crew concocted the story that they were on a reconnaissance mission.

== Geography ==
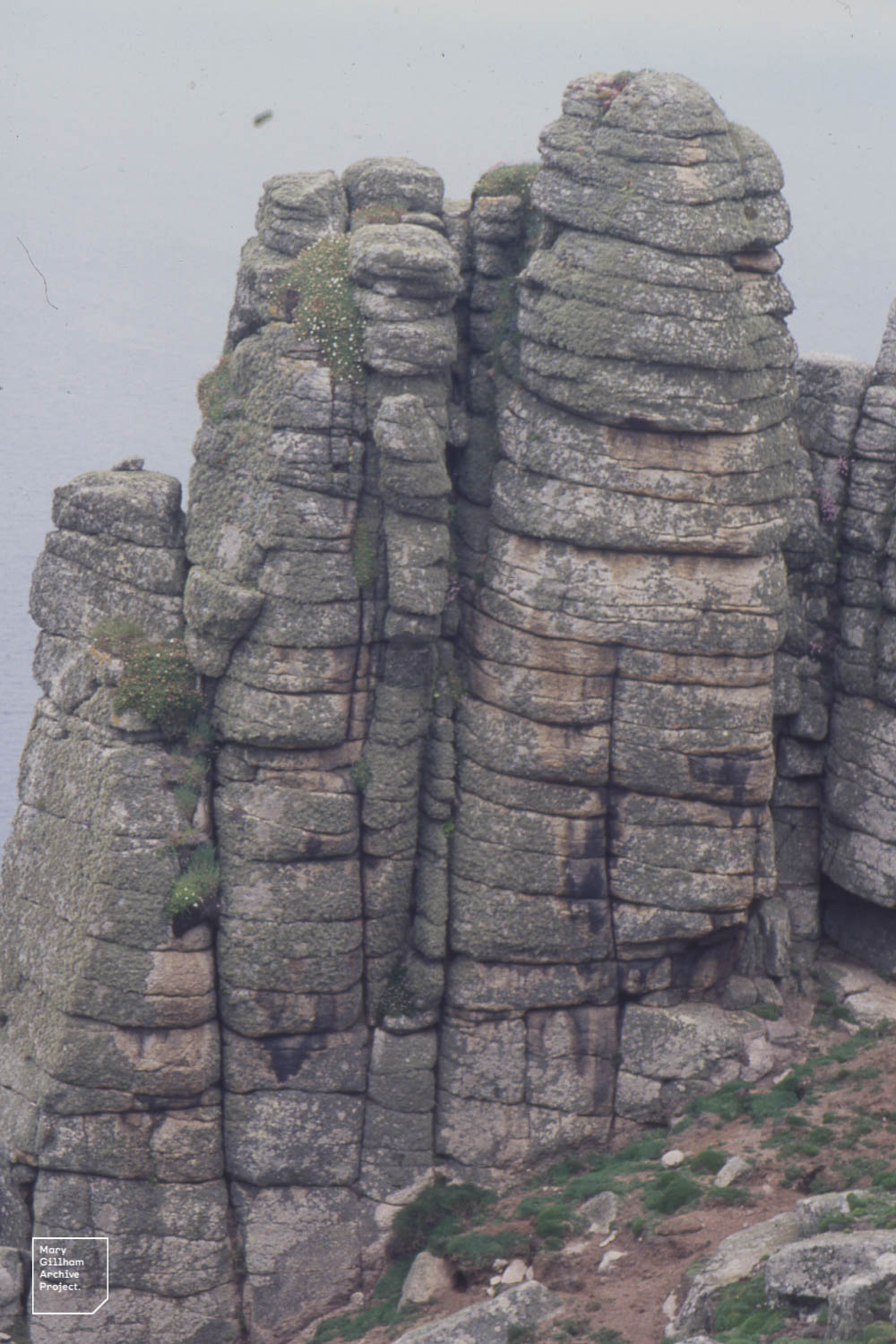
Lundy granite with joints

The island of Lundy is 3 miles (5 km) long from north to south by a little over 5/8 mile (1 kilometre) wide, with an area of 1,100 acres (450 hectares). The highest point is Beacon Hill, 469 feet (143 metres) above sea level. A few yards off the northeastern coast is Seal's Rock which is so called after the seals which rest on and inhabit the islet. It is less than 55 yards (50 metres) wide. Near the jetty is a small pocket beach. One of the Meteorological Office's 31 sea areas announced on the BBC Radio 4 shipping forecast is named Lundy.

=== Geology ===
The island is primarily composed of granite of 59.8 ± 0.4 – 58.4 ± 0.4 million years (from the Palaeocene epoch), with slate at the southern end; the plateau soil is mainly loam, with some peat. Among the igneous dykes cutting the granite are a small number composed of a unique orthophyre. This was given the name Lundyite in 1914, although the term – never precisely defined – has since fallen into disuse. It is possible, based on emplacement of magmas of the basalt, trachyte and rhyolite types at a high levels in Earth's crust, that a volcano system existed above Lundy.

=== Climate ===
Lundy lies on the line where the North Atlantic Ocean and the Bristol Channel meet, so it has quite a mild climate, with cool, wet winters and mild, wet summers. Although it is often windy and fog is frequently experienced. The record high temperature is 29.5 °C (85.1 °F) on 2 August 1990, and the record low temperature is −5.5 °C (22.1 °F) recorded just six months later on 8 February 1991. Lundy is in the USDA 9a plant hardiness zone.

Climate data for Lundy (1973–1994)
Month	Jan	Feb	Mar	Apr	May	Jun	Jul	Aug	Sep	Oct	Nov	Dec	Year
Record high °C (°F)	12.1 (53.8)	14.6 (58.3)	15.7 (60.3)	18.4 (65.1)	21.7 (71.1)	25.0 (77.0)	27.0 (80.6)	29.5 (85.1)	22.2 (72.0)	19.5 (67.1)	18.0 (64.4)	15.0 (59.0)	29.5 (85.1)
Mean maximum °C (°F)	10.2 (50.4)	10.2 (50.4)	11.3 (52.3)	14.3 (57.7)	17.4 (63.3)	20.2 (68.4)	21.2 (70.2)	21.5 (70.7)	19.1 (66.4)	16.6 (61.9)	14.5 (58.1)	11.6 (52.9)	23.0 (73.4)
Mean daily maximum °C (°F)	8.3 (46.9)	7.4 (45.3)	8.6 (47.5)	10.1 (50.2)	12.8 (55.0)	15.3 (59.5)	17.3 (63.1)	17.5 (63.5)	15.9 (60.6)	13.5 (56.3)	11.1 (52.0)	9.1 (48.4)	12.2 (54.0)
Daily mean °C (°F)	7.2 (45.0)	6.3 (43.3)	7.4 (45.3)	8.6 (47.5)	11.0 (51.8)	13.0 (55.4)	15.7 (60.3)	16.0 (60.8)	14.6 (58.3)	12.4 (54.3)	9.6 (49.3)	8.1 (46.6)	10.8 (51.5)
Mean daily minimum °C (°F)	6.0 (42.8)	5.2 (41.4)	6.3 (43.3)	7.1 (44.8)	9.1 (48.4)	12.7 (54.9)	14.3 (57.7)	14.7 (58.5)	13.4 (56.1)	11.3 (52.3)	8.9 (48.0)	7.0 (44.6)	9.7 (49.4)
Mean minimum °C (°F)	1.7 (35.1)	1.1 (34.0)	2.5 (36.5)	3.5 (38.3)	6.8 (44.2)	9.6 (49.3)	12.0 (53.6)	12.3 (54.1)	10.6 (51.1)	8.3 (46.9)	5.2 (41.4)	3.2 (37.8)	−0.4 (31.3)
Record low °C (°F)	−5.0 (23.0)	−5.5 (22.1)	−0.8 (30.6)	−0.9 (30.4)	3.0 (37.4)	5.0 (41.0)	10.4 (50.7)	3.2 (37.8)	8.4 (47.1)	5.1 (41.2)	1.0 (33.8)	0.6 (33.1)	−5.5 (22.1)
Average rainy days	19.2	14.5	17.4	13.0	13.0	12.7	13.2	13.1	16.5	18.5	18.8	19.5	189.4
Average snowy days	0.8	1.3	0.5	0.2	0.0	0.0	0.0	0.0	0.0	0.0	0.0	0.1	2.9
Average relative humidity (%)	84.4	85.6	86.1	85.6	83.4	84.9	84.9	80.2	82.5	81.7	82.0	80.3	83.5
Source 1: En.tutiempo
Source 2: Starlings Roost Weather

== Ecology ==
=== Flora ===
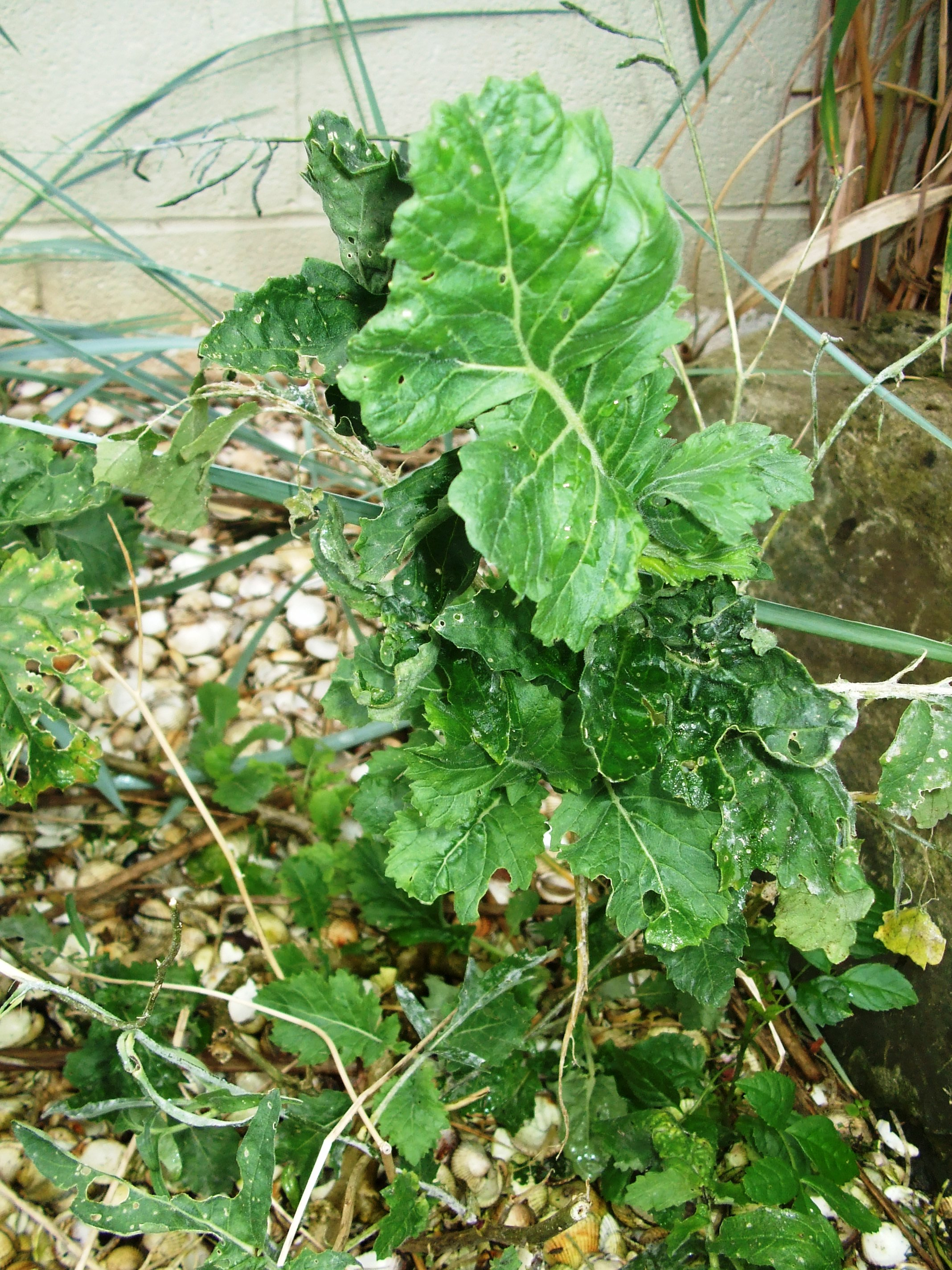
Lundy cabbage (growing at Bristol Zoo)

The vegetation on the plateau is mainly dry heath, with an area of waved Calluna heath; the northern end of the island is largely bare rock. This area is also rich in lichens, such as Teloschistes flavicans and several species of Cladonia and Parmelia.

Other areas are either a dry heath/acidic grassland mosaic, characterised by heaths and western gorse (Ulex gallii), or semi-improved acidic grassland in which Yorkshire fog (Holcus lanatus) is abundant. Tussocky (Thrift) (Holcus/Armeria) communities occur mainly on the western side, and some patches of bracken (Pteridium aquilinum) on the eastern side.

There is one endemic plant species, the Lundy cabbage (Coincya wrightii), a species of primitive brassica.

By the 1980s, the eastern side of the island had become overgrown by rhododendrons (Rhododendron ponticum) which had spread from a few specimens planted in the garden of Millcombe House in Victorian times, but in recent years significant efforts have been made to eradicate this non-native plant.

=== Fauna ===
==== Terrestrial invertebrates ====
Two invertebrate taxa are endemic to Lundy, with both feeding on the endemic Lundy cabbage (Coincya wrightii). These are the Lundy cabbage flea beetle (Psylliodes luridipennis), a species of leaf beetle (family Chrysomelidae) and the Lundy cabbage weevil (Ceutorhynchus insularis, formerly Ceutorhynchus contractus var. pallipes), a variety of true weevil (family Curculionidae). In addition, the Lundy cabbage is the main host of a flightless form of Psylliodes napi (another species of flea beetle) and a wide variety of other invertebrate species which are not endemic to the island. Another resident invertebrate of note is Atypus affinis, the only British species of purseweb spider.

==== Birds ====
The population of puffins (Fratercula arctica) on the island declined in the late 20th and early 21st centuries as a consequence of depredations by brown and black rats (Rattus rattus) and possibly also as a result of commercial fishing for sand eels, the puffins' principal prey. Since the elimination of rats in 2006, seabird numbers have increased. By 2023 the number of puffins had risen to 1,355 and the number of Manx shearwater to 25,000, representing 95% of England's breeding population of this seabird. The island has since 2014 become colonised by European storm petrel.

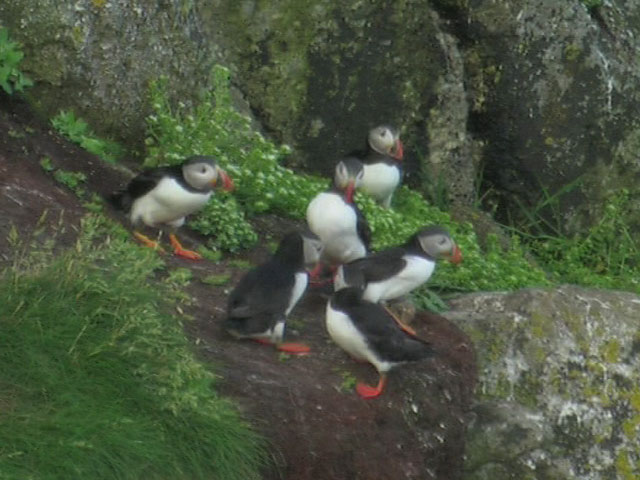
A group of six puffins on Lundy, June 2008

As an isolated island on major migration routes, Lundy has a rich bird life and is a popular site for birdwatching. Large numbers of black-legged kittiwake (Rissa tridactyla) nest on the cliffs, as do razorbill (Alca torda), common guillemot (Uria aalge), European herring gull (Larus argentatus), lesser black-backed gull (Larus fuscus), northern fulmar (Fulmarus glacialis), European shag (Phalacrocorax aristotelis), Eurasian oystercatcher (Haematopus ostralegus), Eurasian skylark (Alauda arvensis), meadow pipit (Anthus pratensis), common blackbird (Turdus merula), European robin (Erithacus rubecula), and linnet (Carduelis cannabina). There are also smaller populations of peregrine falcon (Falco peregrinus) and raven (Corvus corax).

Lundy has attracted many vagrant birds, in particular species from North America. As of 2007, the island's bird list totals 317 species. This has included the following species, each of which represents the sole British record: Ancient murrelet, eastern phoebe, and eastern towhee. Records of bimaculated lark, American robin, and common yellowthroat were also firsts for Britain (American robin has also occurred two further times on Lundy). Veerys in 1987 and 1997 were Britain's second and fourth records, a Rüppell's warbler in 1979 was Britain's second, an eastern Bonelli's warbler in 2004 was Britain's fourth, and a black-faced bunting in 2001 Britain's third.

Other British Birds rarities that have been sighted (single records unless otherwise indicated) are: little bittern; gyrfalcon (3 records); little and Baillon's crakes; collared pratincole; semipalmated (5 records), least (2 records), white-rumped, and Baird's (2 records) sandpipers; Wilson's phalarope; laughing gull; bridled tern; Pallas's sandgrouse; great spotted, black-billed, and yellow-billed (3 records) cuckoos; European roller; olive-backed pipit; citrine wagtail; Alpine accentor; thrush nightingale; red-flanked bluetail; western black-eared (2 records) and desert wheatears; White's, Swainson's (3 records), and grey-cheeked (2 records) thrushes; Sardinian (2 records), Arctic (3 records), Radde's, and western Bonelli's warblers; Isabelline and lesser grey shrikes; red-eyed vireo (7 records); two-barred crossbill; yellow-rumped and blackpoll warblers; yellow-breasted (2 records) and black-headed buntings (3 records); rose-breasted grosbeak (2 records); bobolink; and Baltimore oriole (2 records).

==== Mammals ====
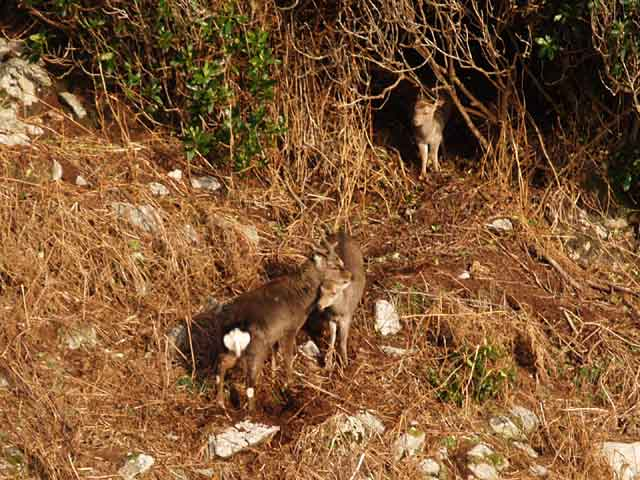
Sika deer

Lundy is home to an unusual range of introduced mammals, including a distinct breed of wild pony, the Lundy pony, as well as Soay sheep (Ovis aries), sika deer (Cervus nippon), feral goats (Capra aegagrus hircus), and European rabbits, some of which are melanistic.

Other mammals which have made the island their home include the grey seal (Halichoerus grypus) and the Eurasian pygmy shrew (Sorex minutus). Until their elimination in 2006, in order to protect the nesting seabirds, Lundy was one of the few places in the UK where the black rat (Rattus rattus) could be found regularly.

==== Marine habitat ====
In 1971, a proposal was made by the Lundy Field Society to establish a marine reserve, and the survey was led by Dr Keith Hiscock, supported by a team of students from Bangor University. Provision for the establishment of statutory Marine Nature Reserves was included in the Wildlife and Countryside Act 1981, and on 21 November 1986 the Secretary of State for the Environment announced the designation of a statutory reserve at Lundy.

There is an variety of marine habitats and wildlife, and a large number of rare and unusual species in the waters around Lundy, including some species of seaweed, branching sponges, sea fans, and cup corals.

In 2003, the first statutory No Take Zone (NTZ) for marine nature conservation in the UK was set up in the waters to the east of Lundy island. In 2008, this was declared as having been successful in several ways including the increasing size and number of lobsters within the reserve, and potential benefits for other marine wildlife. However, the no take zone has received a mixed reaction from local fishermen.

On 12 January 2010 the island became Britain's first Marine Conservation Zone designated under the Marine and Coastal Access Act 2009, designed to help to preserve important habitats and species.

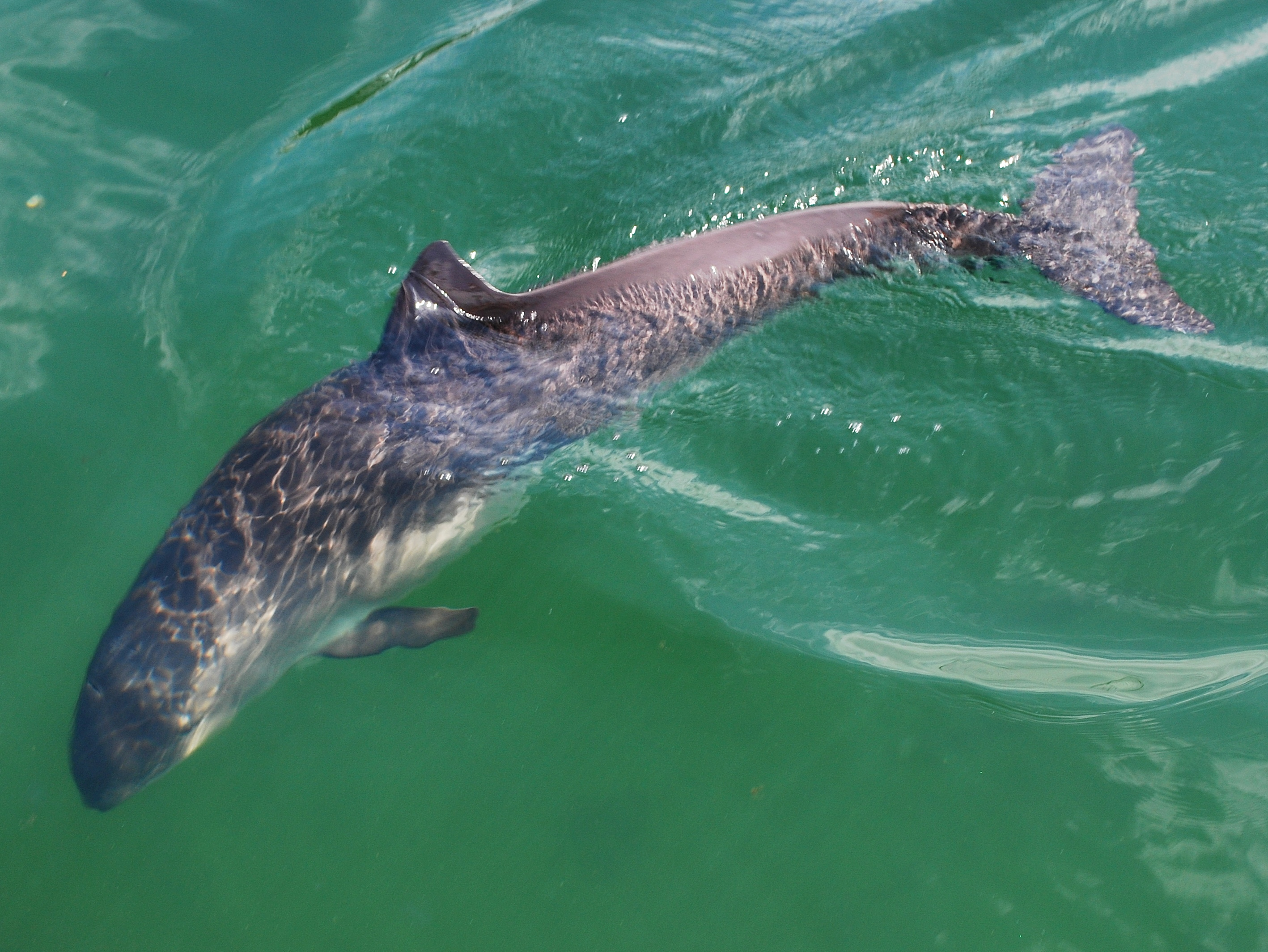
The harbour porpoise is probably the most common cetacean in the waters around Lundy.

Three species of cetacean are regularly seen from the island; these being the bottlenose dolphin (Tursiops truncatrus), common dolphin (Delphinus delphis), and harbour porpoise (Phocoena phocoena). Other cetacean species that are sighted from Lundy, albeit more rarely, are the minke whale (Balaenoptera acutorostrata), Risso's dolphin (Grampus griseus), and long-finned pilot whale (Globicephala melas). Basking sharks (Cetorhinus maximus), ocean sunfish (Mola mola), and leatherback sea turtles (Dermochelys coriacea) are also seen around Lundy, especially off the more sheltered eastern coast and only during the warmer months. Furthermore, there is a grey seal (Halichoerus grypus) colony consisting of roughly 60 animals that live around the island.

== Transport ==
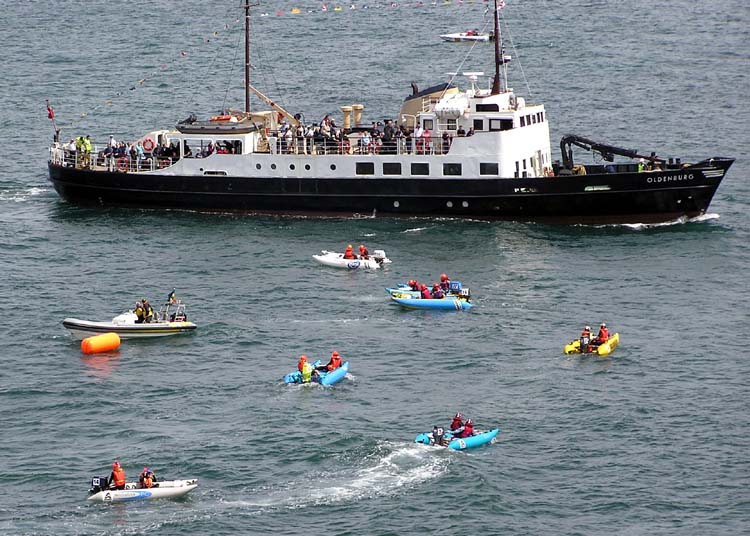
The Lundy ferry Oldenburg sails into Ilfracombe Harbour, North Devon, past inflatable ThunderCat powerboats waiting to begin an offshore race.

=== To the island ===
There are two ways to get to Lundy, depending on the time of year. In the summer months (April to October) visitors are carried on the Landmark Trust's own vessel, MS Oldenburg, which sails from both Bideford and Ilfracombe. Sailings are usually three days a week, on Tuesdays, Thursdays and Saturdays, with additional sailings on Wednesdays during July and August. The voyage takes on average two hours, depending on ports, tides and weather. The Oldenburg was first registered in Bremen, Germany, in 1958 and has been sailing to Lundy since being bought by the Lundy Company Ltd in 1985. In the winter months (November to March) the island is served by a scheduled helicopter service from Hartland Point. The helicopter operates on Mondays and Fridays. A grass runway of 435 by 30 yd (398 by 27 m) is available, allowing access to small STOL aircraft.

=== On the island ===
In 2007, Derek Green, Lundy's general manager, launched an appeal to raise £250,000 to save the 1-mile-long (1.5-kilometre) Beach Road, which had been damaged by heavy rain and high seas. The road was built in the first half of the 19th century to provide people and goods with safe access to the top of the island, 120 m (394 ft) above the only jetty. The fund-raising was completed on 10 March 2009.

=== Lighthouses ===
The island has a pair of active lights built in 1897, and an older lighthouse no longer in service.

== Flags ==
Since 2010, the Landmark Trust management has flown a 1954 flag to represent Lundy, being a white capital L on the hoist of a blue field.

The MS Oldenburg has flown an ensign displaying a puffin on a white circle on a red background since June 2000.

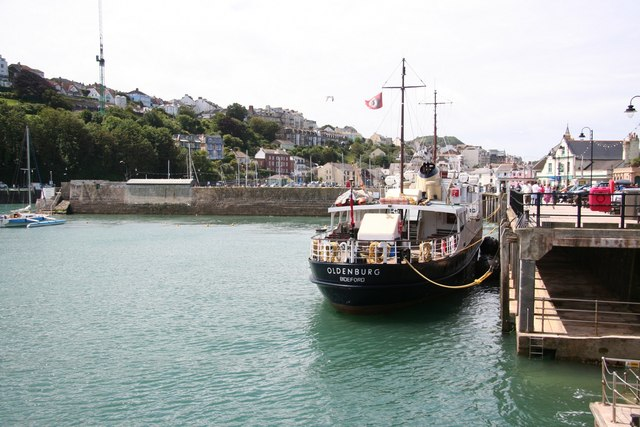
The Oldenburg, the ensign can be seen flying over it

The first flag of Lundy was introduced in 1932 by Martin Coles Harman, as part of his assertion that the island was "a self-governing dominion of the British Empire". The flag was a simple red capital L on a white field with a blue border.

The single flag would eventually rot, and a new one would be made by Harman at least before 1945. The new flag displayed a puffin on a white background with an outer blue and inner red border, and was named the 'Puffin Flag'.

That flag, too, would rot, and Harman would fly the flag of Iceland from the end of World War Two. Tony Langham, who wrote a number of books on the topic of Lundy, wrote in 1989 that he believed Harman's son, John Pennington Harman, who died in the war in 1944, may have been gifted the flag as a "keen flag flyer". In 1954, a new flag design was produced which displayed a white capital L on the hoist of a blue field.

In 1969, after the death of Albion Harman, the island ended up in the management of the Landmark Trust, which opted to instead fly the flag of England. However, in 2010, the trust restored the 1954 flag.

=== Historical flags ===
The first flag, introduced in 1932

The Puffin Flag, introduced in the 1930s–40s

The flag of Iceland, which was flown on the island from the end of World War Two in 1945

The current flag of Lundy, used 1954–1969 and 2010–present

== Electricity supply ==
There is a small power station comprising three Cummins B and C series diesel engines, offering an approximately 150 kVA 3-phase supply to most of the island buildings. Waste heat from the engine jackets is used for a district heating pipe. There are also plans to collect the waste heat from the engine exhaust heat gases to feed into the district heat network to improve the efficiency further. The power is normally switched off between 00:00 and 06:30.

== Administration ==
The island is an unparished area of Torridge district in the county of Devon. It forms part of the ward of Clovelly Bay. It is part of the constituency electing the Member of Parliament for Torridge and Tavistock and was from 1999 to 2020 part of the South West England constituency for the European Parliament.

In 2013, the island became a separate Church of England ecclesiastical parish.

=== Stamps ===
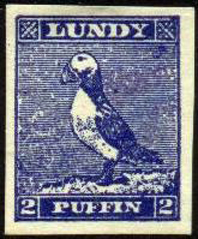
A two-puffin stamp from 1939

Owing to a decline in population and lack of interest in the mail contract, the General Post Office ended its presence on Lundy at the end of 1927. For the next two years Harman handled the mail to and from the island without charge.

On 1 November 1929, he decided to offset the expense by issuing two postage stamps (1/2 puffin in pink and 1 puffin in blue). One puffin is equivalent to one English penny. The printing of Puffin stamps continues to this day and they are available at face value from the Lundy Post Office. One used to have to stick Lundy stamps on the back of the envelope; but from 1962 Royal Mail allowed their use on the front of the envelope, but placed on the left side, with the right side reserved for the Royal Mail postage stamp or stamps. Lundy stamps are cancelled by a circular Lundy hand stamp. In 1974, the face value of the Lundy Island stamps was increased to include Royal Mail charges in addition to the charge for transporting mail to the mainland and so from that year it has not been necessary to affix a separate Royal Mail postage stamp.

Lundy stamps are a type of postage stamp known to philatelists as "local carriage labels" or "local stamps". Issues of increasing value were made over the years, including air mail, featuring a variety of subjects. The market value of the early issues has risen substantially over the years. For the many thousands of annual visitors Lundy stamps have become part of the collection of the many British Local Posts collectors. The first catalogues of these stamps included Gerald Rosen's 1970 Catalogue of British Local Stamps. Later specialist catalogues include Stamps of Lundy Island by Stanley Newman, first published in 1984, Phillips Modern British Locals CD Catalogue, published since 2003, and Labbe's Specialised Guide to Lundy Island Stamps, published since 2005 and now in its 11th Edition. Labbe's Guide is considered the gold standard of Lundy catalogues owing to its extensive approach to varieties, errors, specialised items, and "fantasy" issues.

There is a comprehensive collection of these stamps in the Chinchen Collection, donated by Barry Chinchen to the British Library Philatelic Collections in 1977 and now held by the British Library. This is also the home of the Landmark Trust Lundy Island Philatelic Archive which includes artwork, texts and essays as well as postmarking devices and issued stamps.

== See also ==
- Barbara Whitaker, former warden
- Coins of Lundy
- Puffin Island
