= Coins of Lundy =

Unofficial coinage

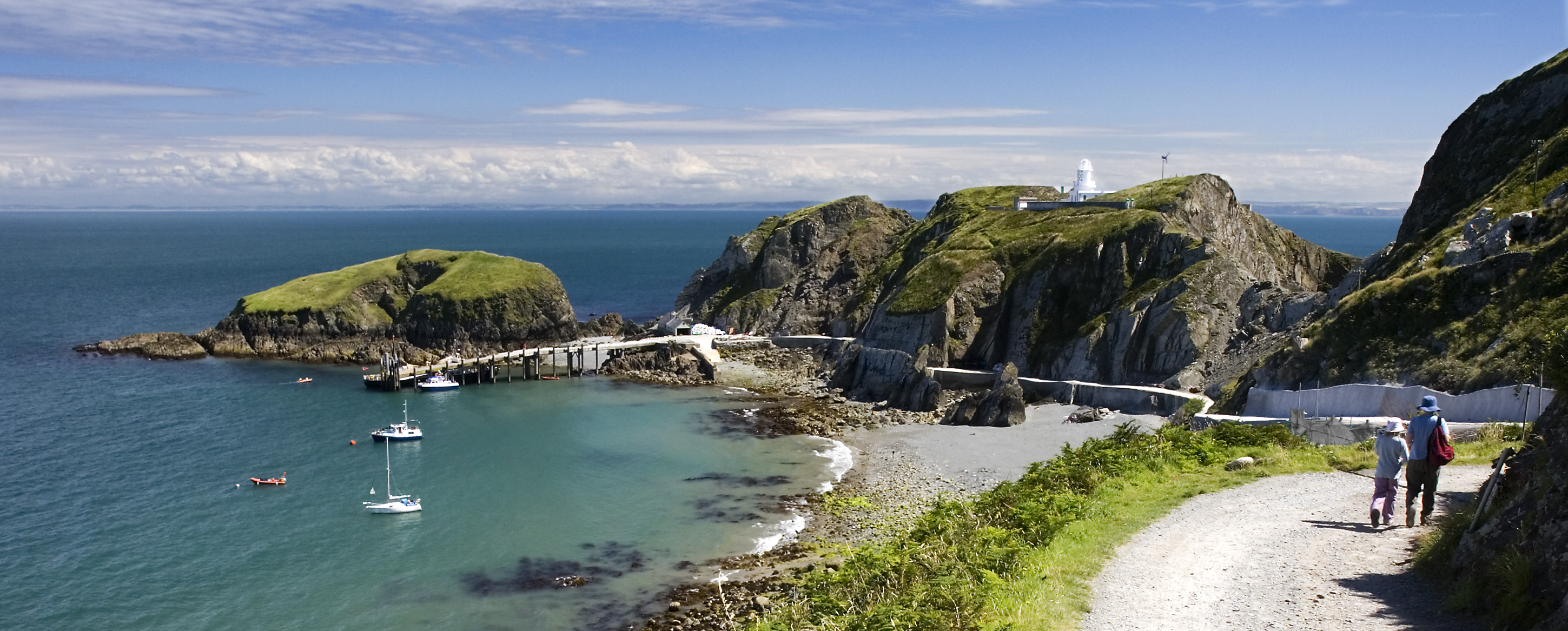
The harbour and jetty at Lundy

The coins of Lundy are unofficial issues of currency from the island of Lundy, in the Bristol Channel off the west coast of England. Two bronze coins, the "half puffin" and "one puffin", were issued with a 1929 date and featured a portrait of Martin Coles Harman, who owned the island and was responsible for the issue. The coins were struck again with slightly modified designs and updated dates in 1965, 1977, and 2011, as commemorative or fantasy tokens not intended for circulation.

== The coin issue of 1929 ==
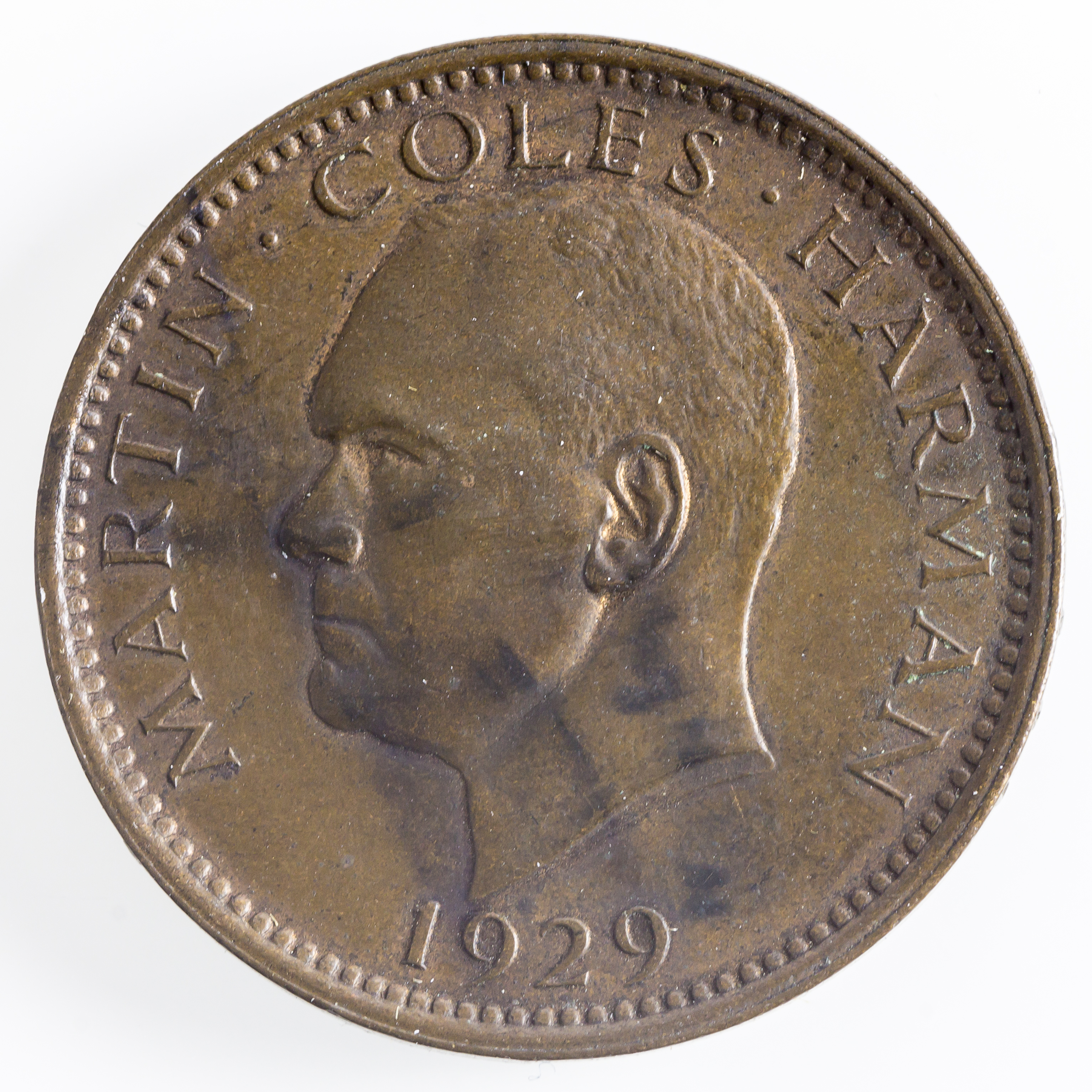
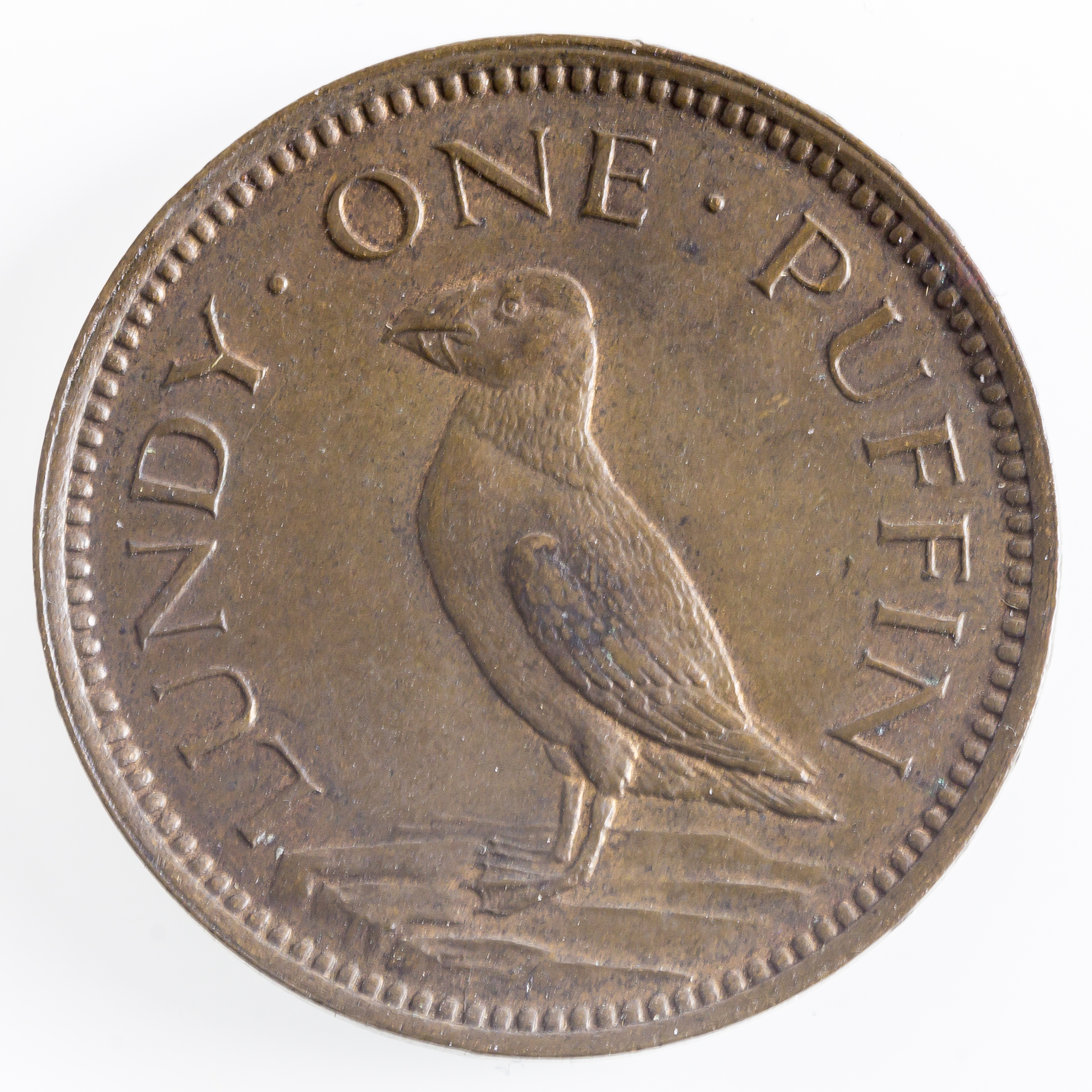
One Puffin 1929 Martin Coles Harman
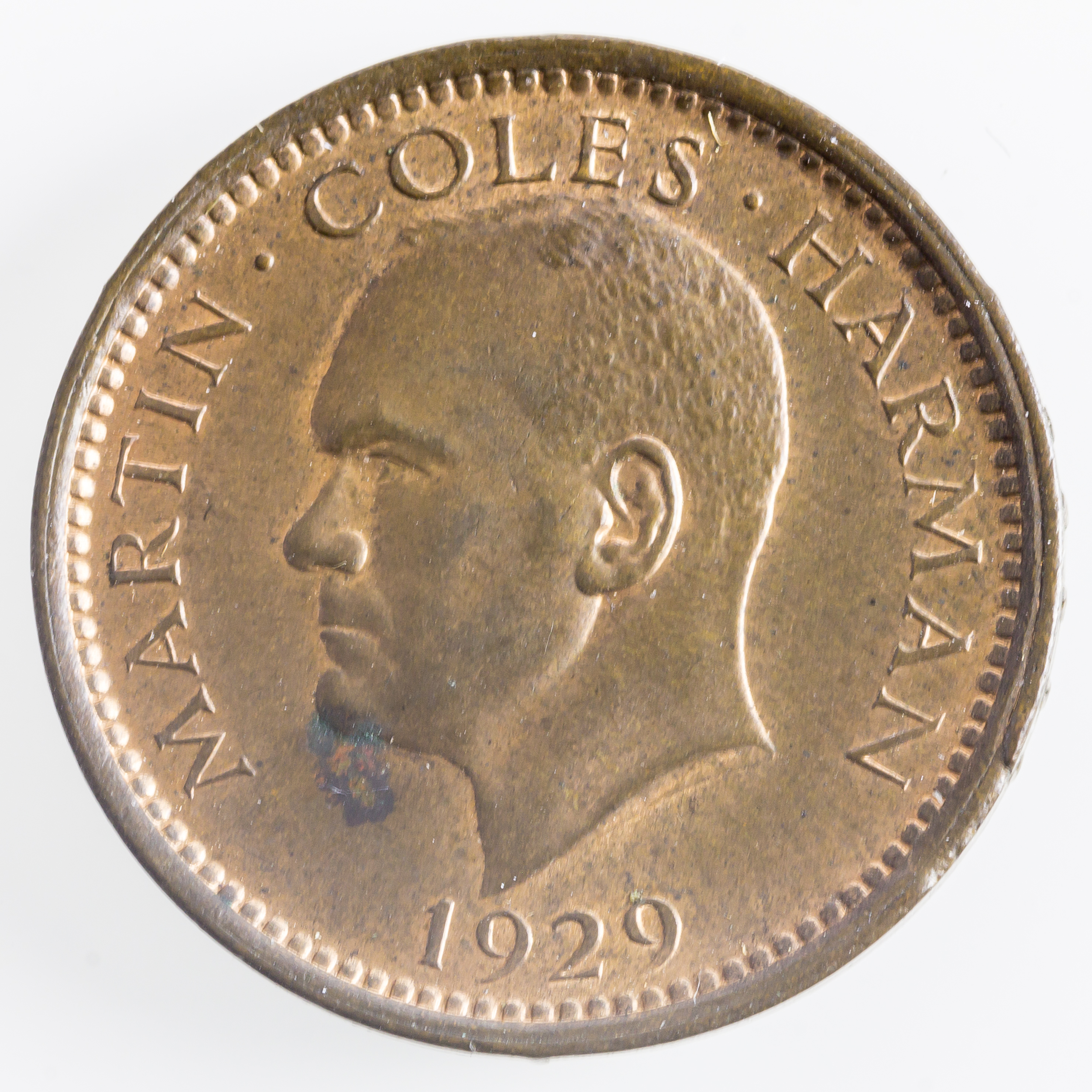
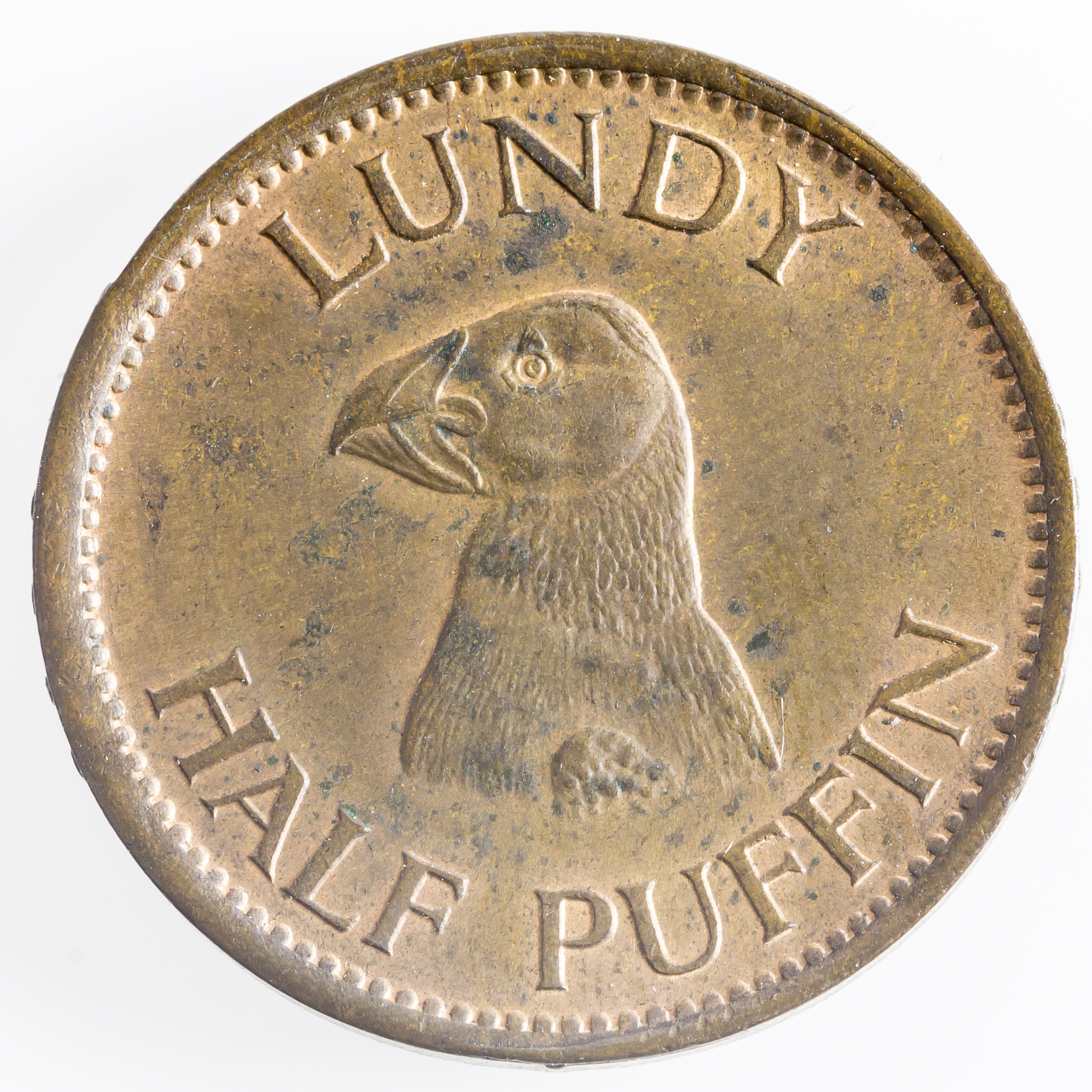
Half Puffin 1929 Martin Coles Harman

The first issue was issued in 1929 by the self-declared 'King of Lundy', Martin Coles Harman, who was an English businessman, born in 1885 in Steyning, Sussex, who bought Lundy in 1925. There were two coins – the Half Puffin and the One Puffin, which were rated at the same nominal value as the British halfpenny and penny. The obverse of the coins depict a portrait facing left with 'MARTIN·COLES·HARMAN'. The edges of the coins are lettered with the inscription 'LUNDY LIGHTS AND LEADS', a reference to the island's two lighthouses. The reverse of the Half Puffin coin depicts a puffin's head; half a Puffin.

The reverse of the One Puffin coin depicts a puffin facing left on a rocky ledge. The unfussy and strong design of the coins is regarded as more than competent with significant modernist touches which foresee the high 1930s design school. The coin was called the puffin because the islanders had a long history of bartering puffin feathers for food and other commodities. The coins were made of bronze, and landed Harman in trouble with the British authorities in 1930 for unauthorised minting of money.

Visitors from the island could exchange any remaining 'puffins' at the banks in Bideford, who then returned the Lundy coins to the island (Coin News 1999). The coins were struck in Birmingham by Ralph Heaton's Mint, Birmingham Ltd. The money saw real, if limited use. Martin Coles Harman died in 1954.

50,000 bronze tokens about the size of a penny were minted by Ralph Heaton & Sons, Birmingham in 1929, together with a similar number of articles about the size of a half-penny. The price was 50/9 per 1000 for the larger and 26/6 for the smaller, and there was a £100 fee for preparing the design and sinking the dies.

Bronze pattern coins of the 1929 issue exist with a thicker flange and the lack of an edge inscription. The details on the obverse and reverse also differ slightly. The coins are highly collectible, although on the open market their prices remain quite reasonable.

== The court cases ==
Harman had sent specimen coins to the Royal Mint and had been thanked for them, although they had warned him about section 5 of the Coinage Act 1870. Harman replied that Lundy was a little Kingdom in the British Empire, but out of England. He recognised King George V as the head of state, however he was adamant that Lundy was a self-governing dominion within the British Empire. This led to a visit from the Devon Constabulary and a Supt. Bolt and other officers reported seeing the coins (tokens) in use at the Marisco Tavern, mixed with standard British Imperial coinage. Harman lost his case at the Petty Sessions in Bideford and appealed to the High Court of Justice where he also lost and was fined £5, with fifteen guineas (£15 15s) costs.

=== Some details of the court cases ===
Sir Hugh N. Grenville Stucley was the presiding magistrate at the Petty Sessional Division court which tried the case of Supt. Bolt on behalf of the Director of Public Prosecutions v. Martin Coles Harman, charged with on the 5th day of March, 1930, in the Island of Lundy in the County of Devon, did unlawfully as a token for money issue a piece of metal to the value of one half-penny, contrary to Section 5 of the Coinage Act of 1870.

The appeal trial was held on 13 January 1931 at the King's Bench Division of the High Court of Justice, in London, and, it was hoped at the time, would settle the status of Lundy once and for all. It didn't – but it did show how utterly confused the situation was. In his defence, Harman said he had every right to mint money, for Lundy, in his words, was "a vest-pocket-size, self-governing dominion," out of the realm for every practical purpose. The Lundy residents, he pointed out, never had paid any taxes to England and were liable to customs when they went there, for Lundy itself was a free port. The Attorney General, who was prosecuting Harman, said that Lundy was surely a Utopia but that its inhabitants would be just as happy if the face of King George V, rather than of Harman, were depicted on the place's currency. (Harman's face was on the front of the coins, and that of a puffin on the back. There were two denominations, a one-puffin coin and a half-puffin coin, neatly convertible to a penny and a ha'penny at the legal rate of exchange.)

=== Time (America) report for Monday, January 20th, 1930 ===
Coins denominated the puffin and half-puffin—respectively worth a British penny and half-penny—have just gone into circulation among the 40 dwellers on Lundy Island in the Bristol Channel, also called "Puffin Island." Both half and whole puffins bear the likeness of Martin Coles Harman, Esq., London merchant, who bought Puffin Island in 1925 and plays at being its king. On the "tails" side of a puffin is the head of a puffin (sea bird with a parrotlike beak and white cheeks). Puffin Islanders also have puffin stamps. Red and green, in puffin and half-puffin denominations, each having a handsome steel engraving of a puffin perched on a rock.

== The 1965 issue of Lundy coinage ==
In 1965, a second issue of coins, made by John Pinches, was carried out. These were a commemorative issue to commemorate the 40th anniversary of Martin Coles Harman's purchase of Lundy. The coins are of the same design as the 1929 issue coins, but have plain edges and the 1965 date. They were struck in proof sets, in bronze, nickel-brass, and gold. They were issued in a special case of which at least two varieties exist. 3000 of the base metal sets were issued and 25 of the gold sets.

Apart from the sets, 25 each of the proof gold denominations were also issued for presentation purposes. It has been reported that Lundy puffin forgeries may exist. This seems unlikely and it may be that confusion with the 'pattern coins' or between the 1929 and 1965 issues has resulted in an erroneous interpretation. Unlike the 1929 issues, which did circulate, these are generally not considered numismatic items.

=== Lundy coins - 1929, 1965, 1977 and 2011 ===
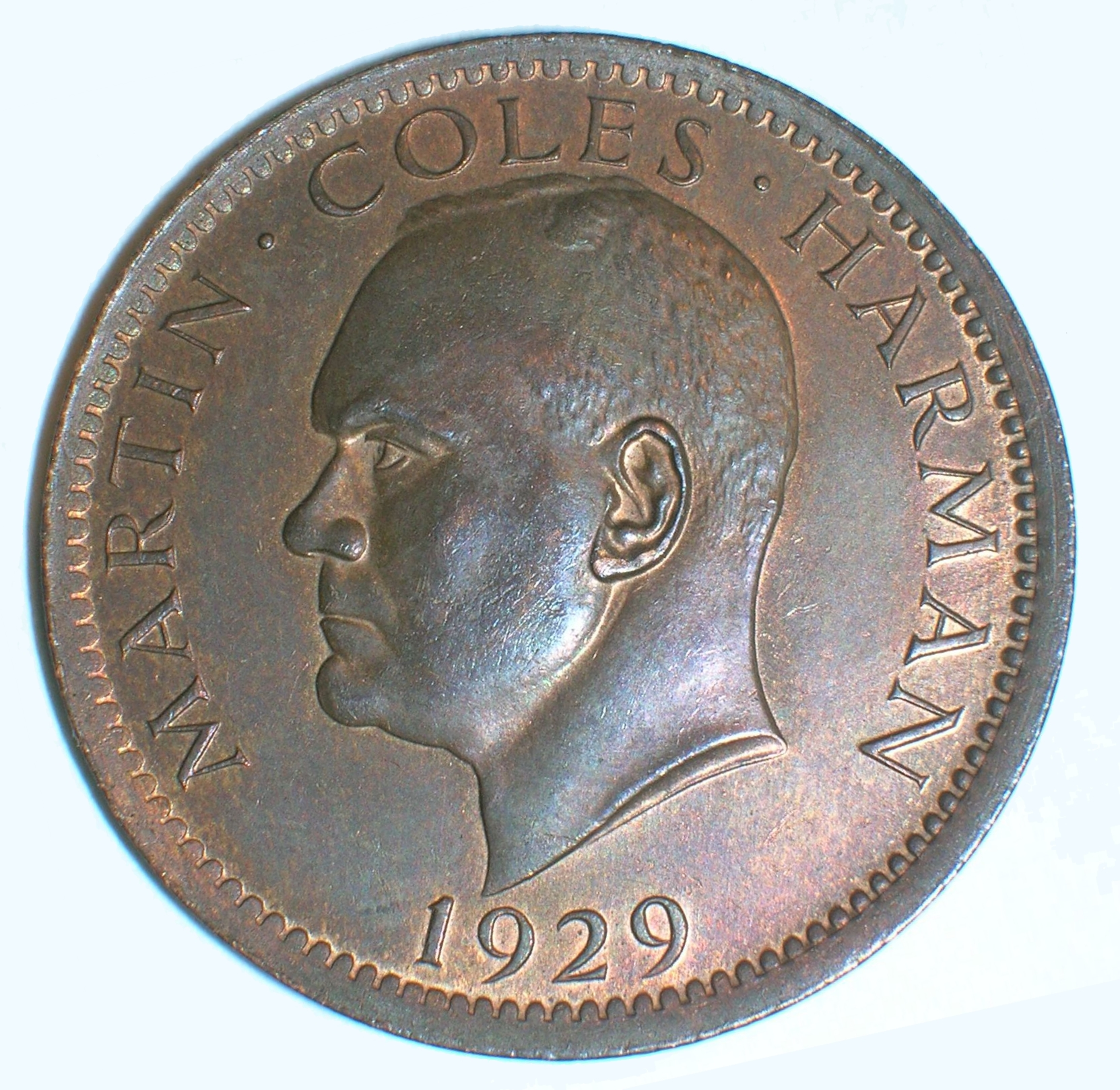
1929 1 Puffin coin

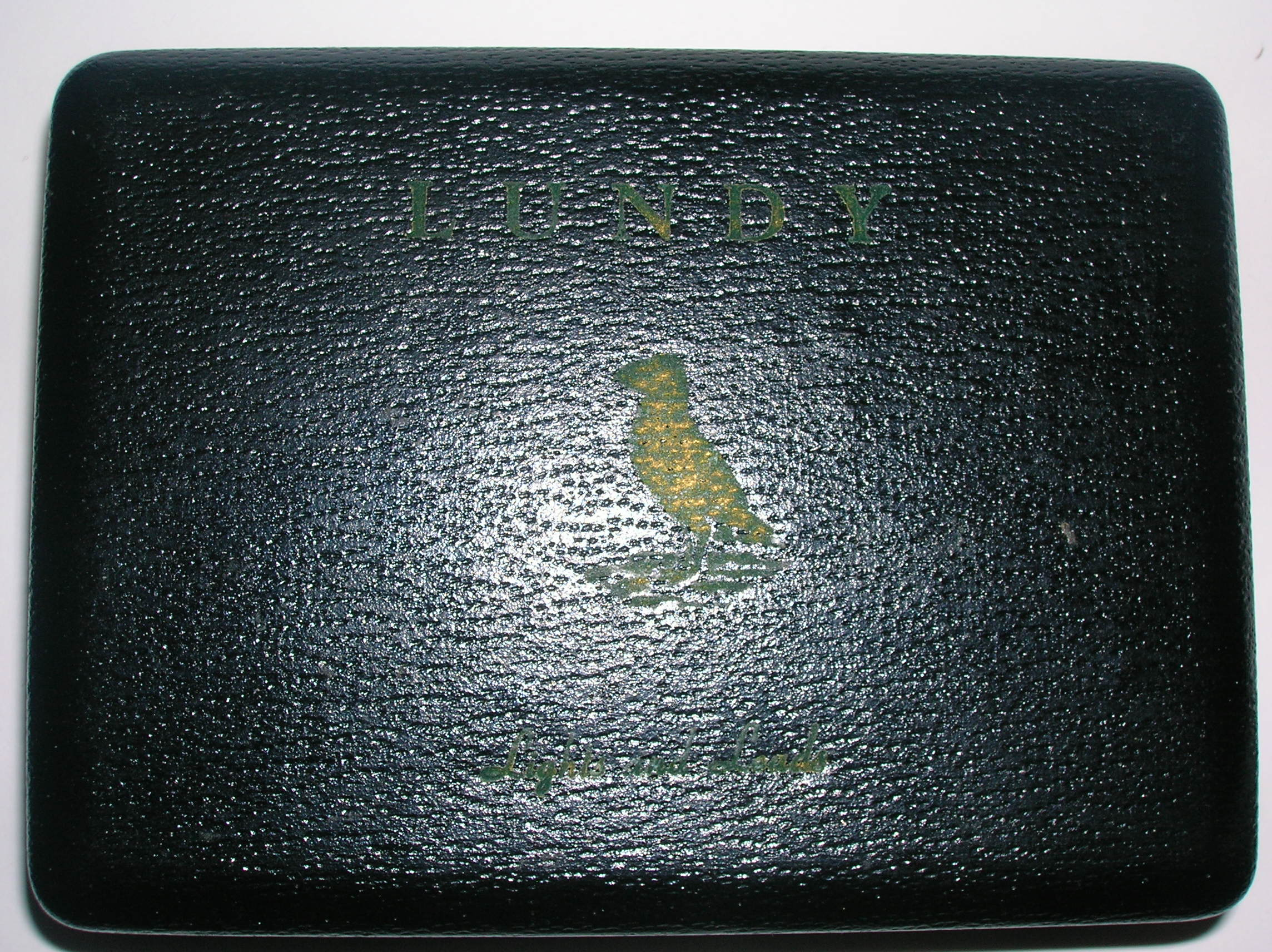
1965 fantasy coin case

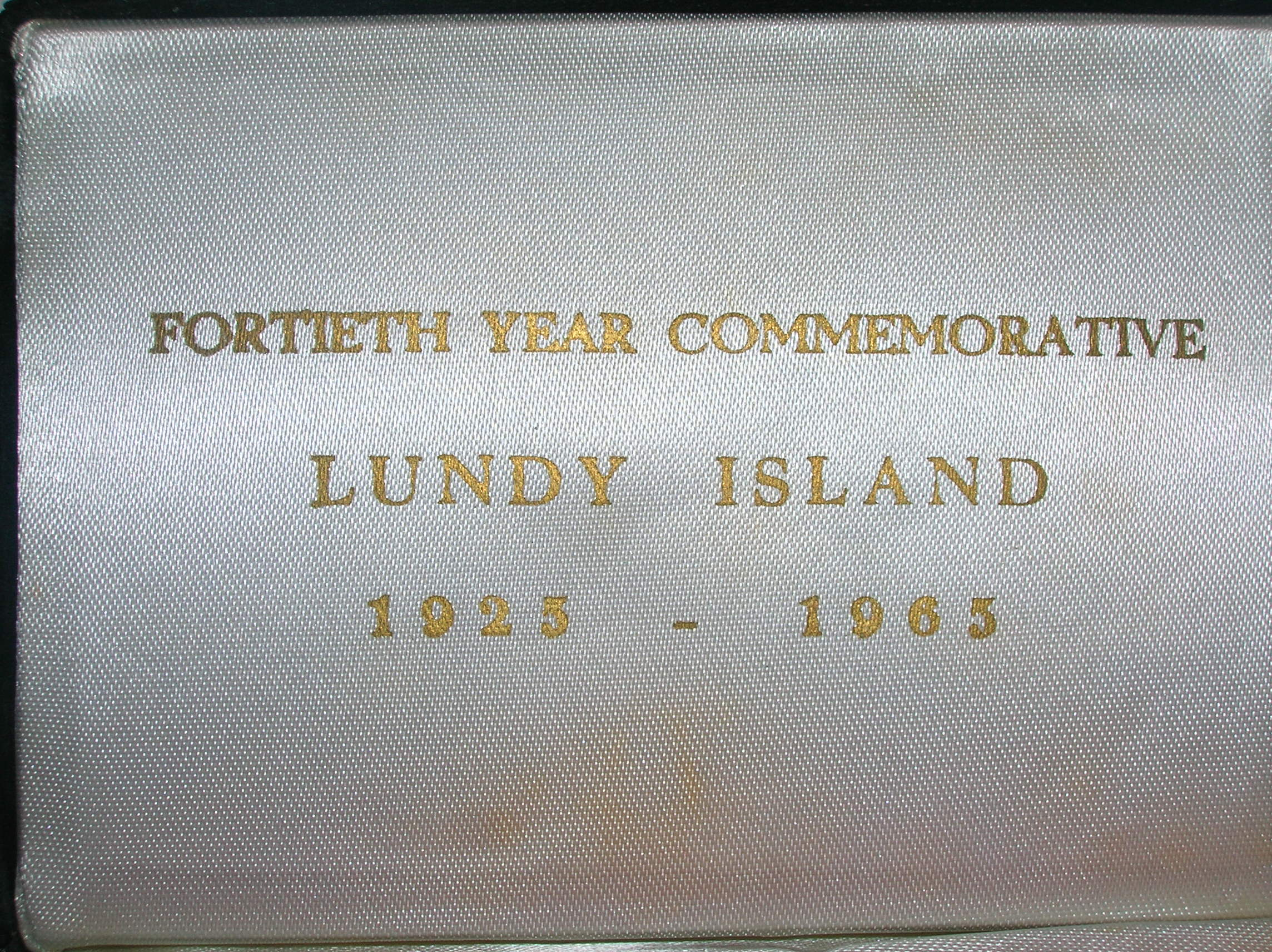
1965 fantasy coin set details

1965 fantasy coin set

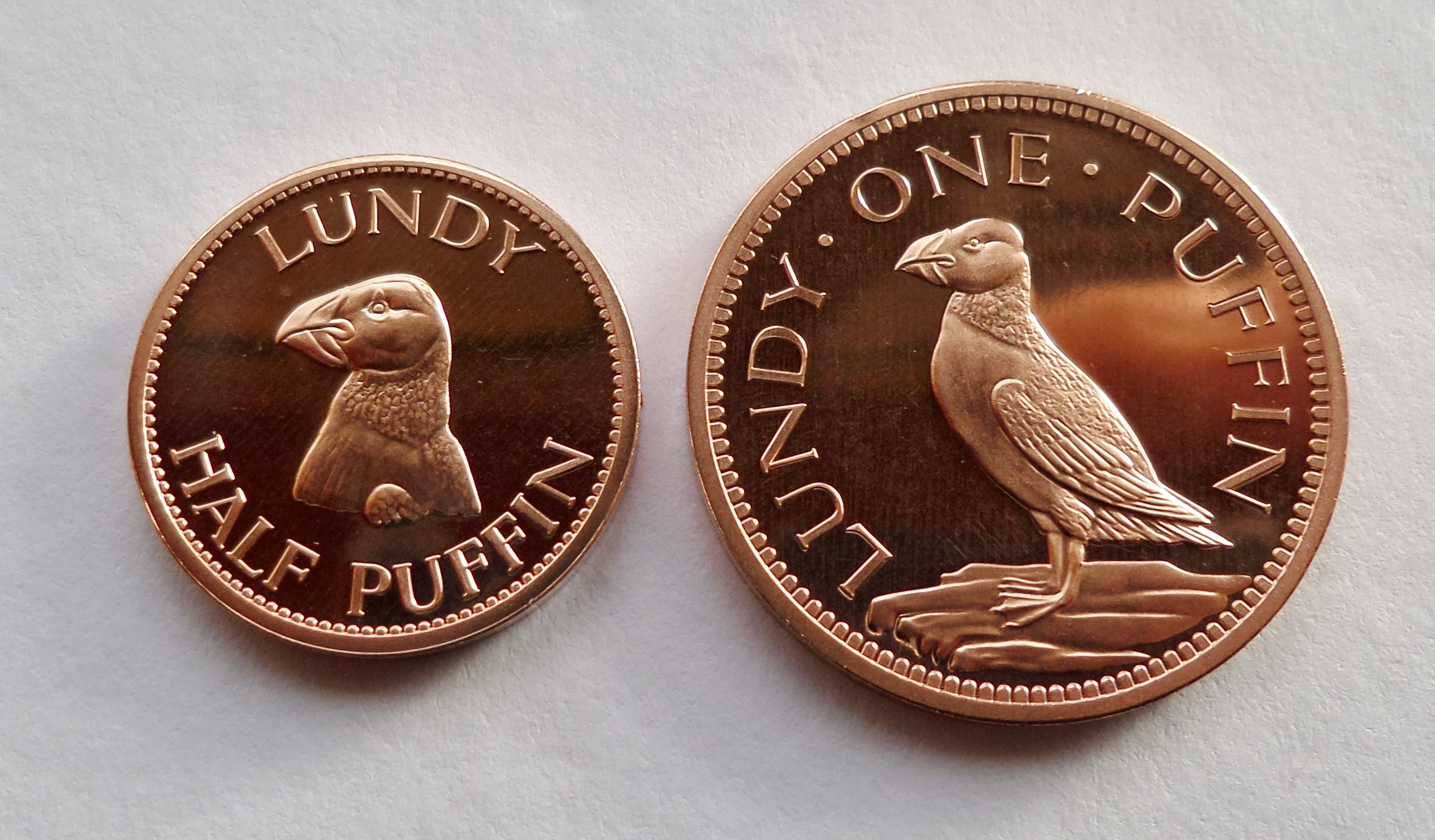
1977 Puffin Coins

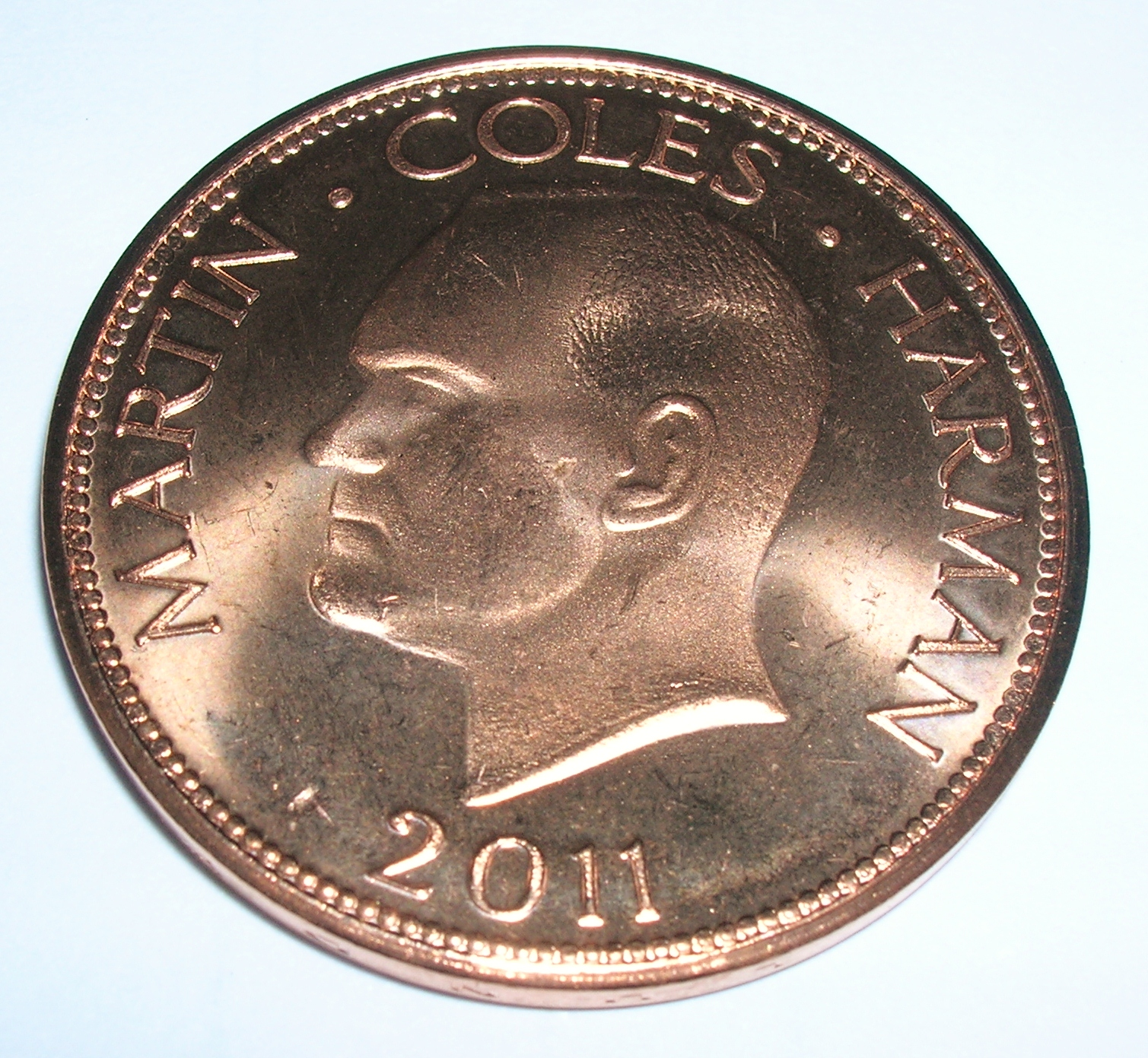
2011 1 Puffin coin

== 1977 coins ==
In 1977 Queen Elizabeth II visited Lundy Island as part of the celebrations of her Silver Jubilee. 1,977 Puffin and half Puffin proof grade copper tokens have been produced bearing this date. The designs are very similar if not identical to the 1929 and 1965 issues, however they do not carry the edge inscription. It is not clear when they were minted as they only came on to the numismatic market in 2014.

== 2011 coins ==
A set of five 'fantasy' Lundy coins were put on sale in 2011. These five coins are dated 2011 and are in the Puffin denominations: half, one, two, four and six P. This set is distinct since only half and one puffin coins had been issued in the past. They carry the same edge inscription as the original 1929 coins, though the inscription is incuse rather than raised and a similar, less boldly engraved portrait of Martin Coles Harman. The half and one P are copper plated brass, the two and four are in a brass and the six P is copper nickel. The half and one puffin coins are smaller in size. The 1929 & 1965 puffin is 29.29mm whilst the 2011 puffin is 27.3mm. The half puffins are nearly identical in size. The two P has two puffins flying, the four P a Lundy lighthouse with four puffins flying next to it, and the six P has Tresco Castle on the reverse with six puffins flying above it. The six P coin has a reeded edge and is crown size. The quality of these coins is quite high.

== Thomas Bushell and coins of the Civil War ==
Another possible coinage connection exists through the activities of Thomas Bushell, friend of Francis Bacon, a strong supporter of the Royalist cause during the First English Civil War, and an expert on mining and coining. It has been argued that during his stay on Lundy he produced coinage for King Charles I, however definitive proof has not been found and it remains speculation. He held Lundy for the king and this was the last part of the king's lands to capitulate to the victorious Parliamentary forces after a siege lasting a year.

== See also ==
- Token coins
- List of micronation currencies

== Bibliography ==
- Becker, Thomas W. (1961). The puffin coins of Lundy.
