= Martin Coles Harman =

English landowner and fraudster

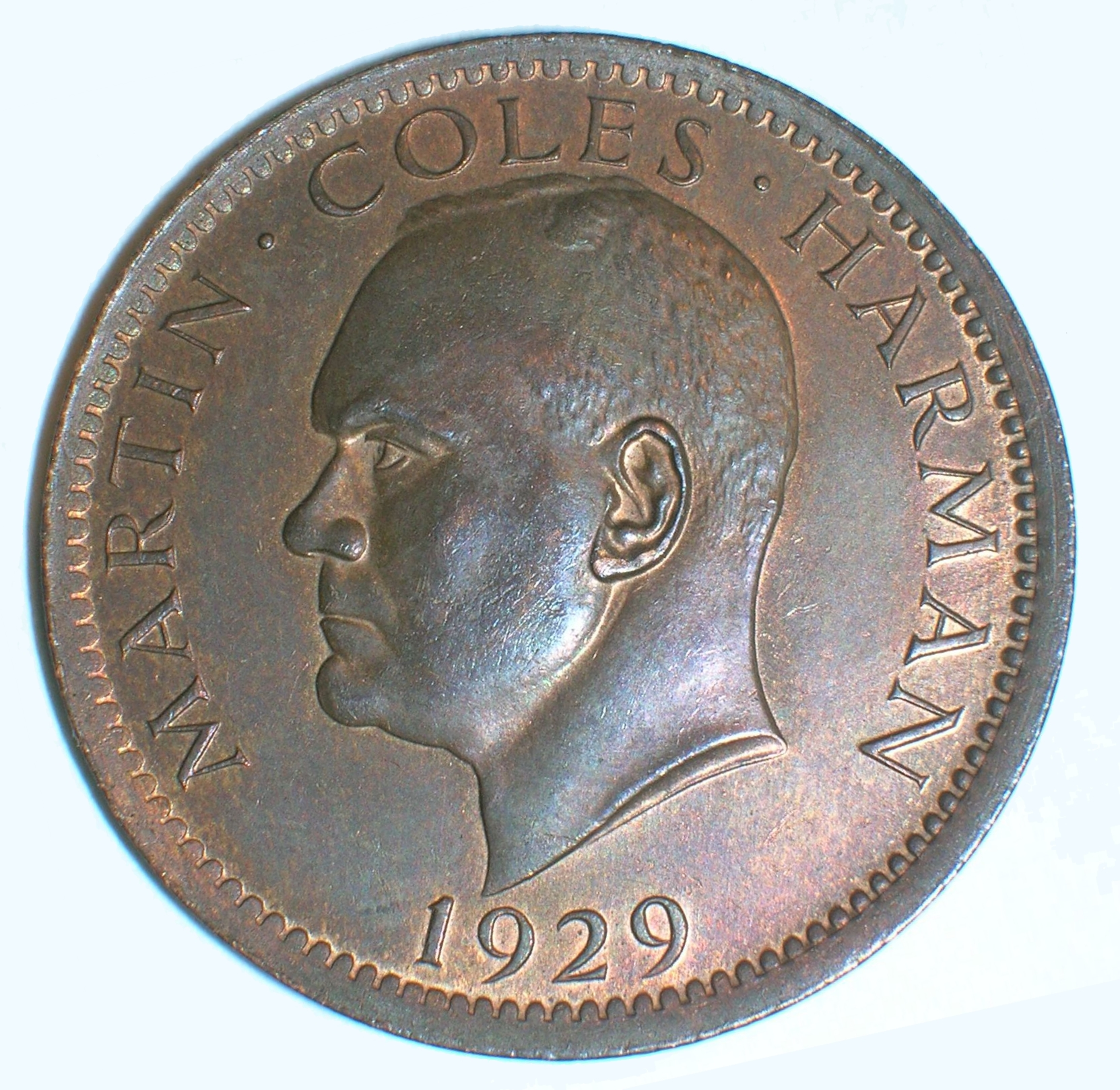
- A one Puffin coin of 1929, bearing the portrait of Martin Coles Harman

Sovereign/Lord of Lundy
- Reign: 1925 – c. November 1933
- Predecessor: Augustus Langham Christie (as immediate predecessor and private owner (Note: as cited in); Sir Vere Hunt, 1st Baronet (as notable predecessor and leader of an Irish colony on Lundy)
- Successor: Albion Harman
- Born: 1885; Steyning, Sussex, United Kingdom
- Died: 5 December 1954 (aged 68–69); Oxted, Surrey
- Spouse: Amy Ruth Bodger (m. 1913; died 1931)
- Children: John Pennington Harman; Albion Pennington Harman; Ruth Pennington Harman Jones; Diana Pennington Keast
Regnal name
- Sovereign Harman
- Occupation: Businessman

Criminal details
- Conviction(s): Unlawful currency production (first trial); Embezzlement (second trial)
- Criminal penalty: £5 fine (1st conviction); 18 months imprisonment (2nd conviction)
- Criminal status: Released

Martin Coles Harman (1885 – 5 December 1954) was an English businessman who, in 1925, bought the island of Lundy.

Born in Steyning in Sussex and educated at Whitgift School in Croydon, Harman had six brothers and five sisters. At the age of 16, he left school to work for Lazard, and became an influential figure in early 20th-century corporate finance in the City of London. In 1913, he married Amy Ruth Harman (née Bodger), and, in June 1919, Mr Harman moved to Chaldon, Surrey, where he lived with his wife and their four children. In 1926, he donated land he owned in the village to the National Trust which was subsequently named "Six Brothers Field" at his request.

Harman bought Lundy island and its supply boat the MV Lerina in 1925 for £25,000 (Note: the island alone cost £16,000) (equivalent to £1,314,090 in 2025). In 1927, the GPO ended postal services to the island. For the next two years, Harman handled, and covered the costs of all the island's postage himself. On 1 November 1929, Harman introduced his own "Puffin" stamps to offset this cost. One Puffin is equivalent to one English penny, and printing of the stamps continues today covering the cost of shipping to the mainland, and postage in the UK and abroad. He later issued an independent Lundy currency of half Puffin and one Puffin coins, which were nominally equivalent to the British halfpenny and penny. This resulted in his prosecution by UK authorities for issuing illegal coinage under the Coinage Act 1870. He was found guilty in 1931, and was fined £5 (equivalent to £294 in 2025) with fifteen guineas (£15 15s) expenses (equivalent to £928 in 2025). The coins were withdrawn and have since become collector's items.

In 1928, Harman established the Lundy pony.

By 1928, Harman controlled a portfolio of companies worth an estimated £12 million. However, in 1931, his wife Amy died of kidney failure aged 47, and one year later Harman was declared bankrupt. As Lundy had been held in trust, Harman was able to keep his ownership of the island despite his bankruptcy. In November 1933, Harman was found guilty on charges of conspiracy to defraud in connection with a Korean syndicate, and was sentenced to 18 months in prison.

Harman's son, John Pennington Harman was awarded a posthumous Victoria Cross in Kohima, India in 1944. There is a memorial to him at the "VC Quarry" on the east side of Lundy.

== Bibliography ==
- Best, Brian (2017). The Victoria Cross Wars: Battles, Campaigns and Conflicts of All the VC Heroes. Barnsley, South Yorkshire: Pen and Sword. ISBN 978-1-4738-8738-1. Archived from the original on 9 May 2022.
- Blunt, W (1986). John Christie of Glyndebourne. London, UK: Geoffrey Bles.
- Coutanche, André (n.d.). "History 1925–1969 – the Harman era". The Lundy Field Society. Archived from the original on 20 May 2022.
- Fookes, Gwyneth (n.d.). Packham, Roger; Fookes, Gwyneth (eds.). Village Histories 7. Chaldon. Vol. 7. Surrey, England: The Bourne Society. Archived from the original on 20 May 2022.
- Graham, J A. Maxtone (19 March 1972). "Lundy Is 12 Miles Off England's Coast But Centuries Away in Tradition". The New York Times. Vol. 121, no. 41693 (Late City ed.). p. XX9 – via TimesMachine.
- Harfield, Clive (1997). "Rebels and Recluses: Lundy's history in context" (PDF). In Irving, RA; Schofield, AJ; Webster, CJ (eds.). Island Studies: Fifty Years of the Lundy Field Society. Bideford, Devon: The Lundy Field Society. pp. 39–58. ISBN 0-9530532-0-2. Archived from the original (PDF) on 17 June 2022.
- Joint, Laura (13 May 2010). "Delivering a unique postal service in Lundy". BBC News. Archived from the original on 9 May 2022.
- "King of Lundy Island' Is Dead at 69; M. C. Harman Bought Vest-Pocket Domain Off England in '25". The New York Times. Vol. 104, no. 35381 (Late City ed.). 7 December 1954. p. 24. Archived from the original on 10 June 2022 – via TimesMachine.
- Palmer, Robert (13 October 2019). "A concise biography of Lance Corporal John Pennington HARMAN, V.C." (PDF). British Military History. Archived (PDF) from the original on 9 May 2022.
- Stables, Daniel (24 May 2021). "Lundy: The tiny isle with a wild, lawless past". BBC Travel. BBC. Archived from the original on 6 December 2021.
- "The Harman Years". landmarktrust.org.uk/lundyisland/. Landmark Trust. n.d. Archived from the original on 20 May 2022.
- Tikkanen, Amy (6 May 2008) [20 July 1998]. "Martin Coles Harman". Encyclopaedia Britannica. Encyclopaedia Britannica, Inc. Archived from the original on 18 May 2022.
