= Donald Easten =

British Army officer

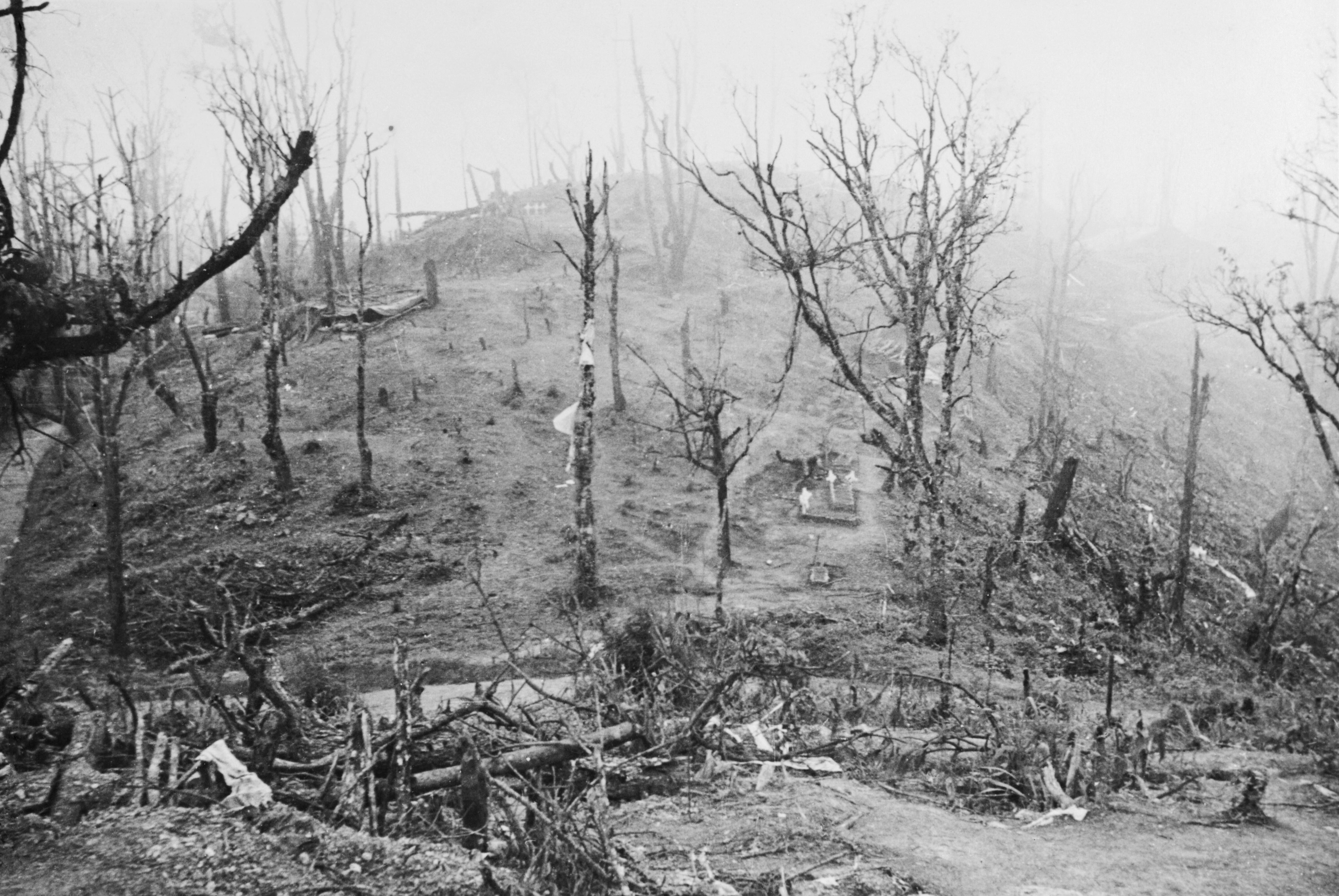
Garrison Hill battlefield, the key to the British defences at Kohima.

Donald Friswell Easten MC (15 July 1918 – 28 February 2017) was a British Army officer of the Royal West Kents who was awarded the Military Cross for his actions during the defence of Kohima from Japanese attack during the Second World War. In retirement he bred Hampshire Down sheep and was Master of Hounds to both the Colchester Garrison Beagles and the Eastern Counties Otter Hounds .

== Second World War service ==
Originally a clerk working in the City of London, Easten joined the Territorial Army (TA), the part-time reserve force of the British Army, in 1938. He was commissioned from the Honourable Artillery Company as a second lieutenant into the Queen's Own Royal West Kent Regiment on 14 January 1940, over four months after the outbreak of the Second World War. His service number was 113515. Joining the 4th Battalion of his regiment in 1942, Easten was in North Africa and Iraq before reaching India in 1943.

By 1944, as a captain, Easten was commanding D Company of the 4th Battalion, Queen's Own Royal West Kent Regiment. On 5 April 1944, as the Japanese Army laid siege to Kohima, his company led the 161st Indian Infantry Brigade convoy as it tried to re-enter the village. Despite being recommended for an immediate award on 10 May 1944, Easten was not awarded the Military Cross (MC) until 8 February 1945. His award was for bravery both in the Arakan from 16 to 23 March and during the Battle of Kohima from 7 to 8 April 1944. On both occasions he showed "complete disregard for his own safety". On 9 April 1944, one of Easten's soldiers, Lance Corporal John Harman, was shot while performing actions that caused him to later be awarded the Victoria Cross (VC). On seeing Harman fall, Easten ran to him and managed to pull him into a trench, only for him to die in Easten's arms.

At the end of the war, Easten was Mentioned in Dispatches for gallant and distinguished service during the Burma campaign.

== Post-war military service ==
On 2 August 1947, Easten relinquished his emergency commission in the Royal West Kent Regiment together with his war-substantive rank of captain to take a regular commission as a lieutenant in the Royal Army Service Corps. For his previous service with the Royal West Kent Regiment, Easten was belatedly awarded the Efficiency Medal (Territorial) in August 1949. By this time, although still a substantive lieutenant, he had attained the temporary rank of major in the Royal Army Service Corps. He was promoted to substantive major on 8 November 1952. He was further promoted to lieutenant colonel on 22 August 1960 and to colonel on 14 June 1965. After more than 33 years of military service, Colonel Easten retired from the regular Army on 31 January 1973.
