= Battle of Kohima =

1944 battle around Kohima, Nagaland, India

- Part of Operation U-Go during the Burma campaign of World War II
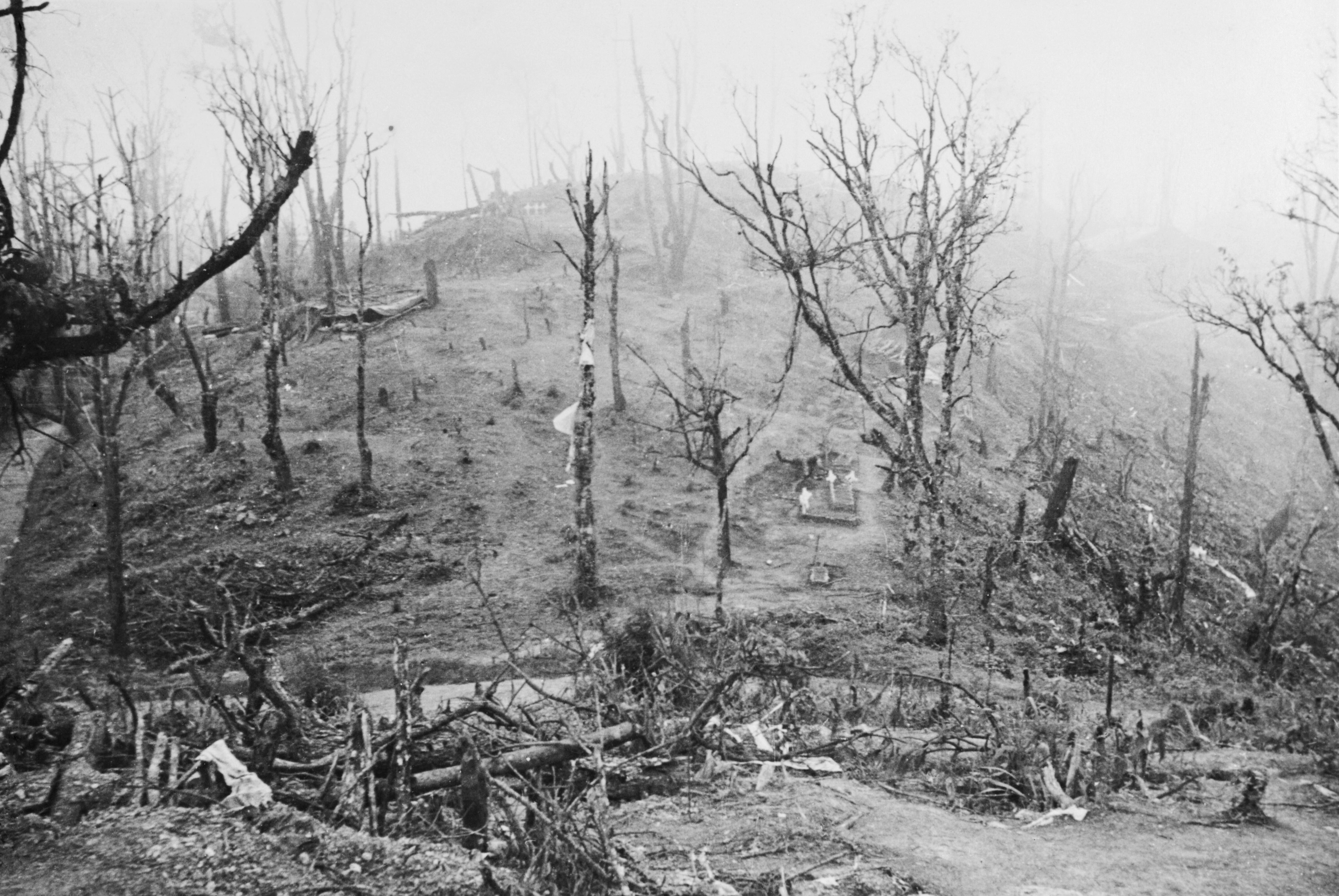
- View of the Garrison Hill battlefield, the key to the British defences at Kohima
Date	4 April – 22 June 1944
Location	Kohima, Naga Hills District, Assam Province, British India (now Nagaland, India) 25.66639°N 94.10035°E
Result	Allied victory

Belligerents
United Kingdom: (British Raj) India; Nepal	(Empire of Japan) Japan: (India) Azad Hind

Commanders and leaders
(United Kingdom) Montagu Stopford	(Empire of Japan) Kōtoku Satō

Strength
Start: 1 infantry brigade (1,500); End: 2 infantry divisions 1 Chindit brigade 1 motor brigade	1 infantry division (15,000–20,000)

Casualties and losses
4,064	5,764–7,000 (Combat deaths only, more lost to disease and starvation)

The Battle of Kohima was the turning point of the Japanese U-Go offensive into British India in 1944 during the Second World War. It took place in three stages from 4 April to 22 June 1944 around the town of Kohima, now the capital city of the state of Nagaland in Northeast India. From 3 to 16 April, the Japanese attempted to capture Kohima ridge, a feature which dominated the road by which the besieged British and Indian troops of IV Corps at Imphal were supplied. By mid-April, the small British and British Indian force at Kohima was relieved.

From 18 April to 13 May British and British Indian reinforcements counter-attacked to drive the Japanese from the positions they had captured. The Japanese abandoned the ridge at this point but continued to block the Kohima–Imphal road. From 16 May to 22 June the British and British Indian troops pursued the retreating Japanese and reopened the road. The battle ended on 22 June when British and British Indian troops from Kohima and Imphal met at Milestone 109, ending the Siege of Imphal.

The Battles of Kohima and Imphal have been referred to by authors such as Martin Dougherty, Frank McLynn, and Jonathan Ritter as the "Stalingrad of the East".

== Background ==
The Japanese plan to invade India, codenamed U-Go, was originally intended as a spoiling attack against the British IV Corps at Imphal in Manipur, to disrupt the Allied offensive plans for that year. The commander of the Japanese Fifteenth Army, Lieutenant General Renya Mutaguchi, enlarged the plan to invade India itself and perhaps even overthrow the British Raj. (Note: According to Julian Thompson, "To this day [in 2010] there is disagreement on whether or not Mutaguchi intended to stop at Imphal. He favoured pressing on into India, and with help from uprisings by Indian nationalists in India, throwing the British out. … A possible indicator of Mutaguchi’s aspirations… was the inclusion of the 1st Indian National Army (INA) Division [an anti-British force]…. The INA was ineffective in battle so Mutaguchi’s motive for saddling himself with seven thousand useless mouths could only have been to use them for propaganda on arrival in India".)

If the Japanese were able to gain a strong foothold in India they would demonstrate the weakness of the British Empire and provide encouragement to Indian nationalists in their decolonization efforts. Moreover, occupation of the area around Imphal would severely impact American efforts to supply Chiang Kai-shek's army in China. The objections of the staffs of various headquarters were eventually overcome, and the offensive was approved by Imperial General Headquarters on 7 January 1944.

Part of the plan involved sending the Japanese 31st Division (which was composed of the 58th, 124th and 138th Infantry Regiments and the 31st Mountain Artillery Regiment) to capture Kohima and thus cut off Imphal. Mutaguchi wished to exploit the capture of Kohima by pushing the 31st Division on to Dimapur, the vital railhead and logistic base in the Brahmaputra River valley.

The 31st Division's commander, Lieutenant General Kōtoku Satō, was unhappy with his role. He had not been involved in the planning of the offensive, and had grave misgivings about its chances. He had already told his staff that they might all starve to death. In common with many senior Japanese officers, Sato considered Mutaguchi a "blockhead". He and Mutaguchi had also been on opposite sides during the split between the Toseiha and Kodoha factions within the Japanese Army during the early 1930s, and Sato believed he had reason to distrust Mutaguchi's motives.

== Prelude ==
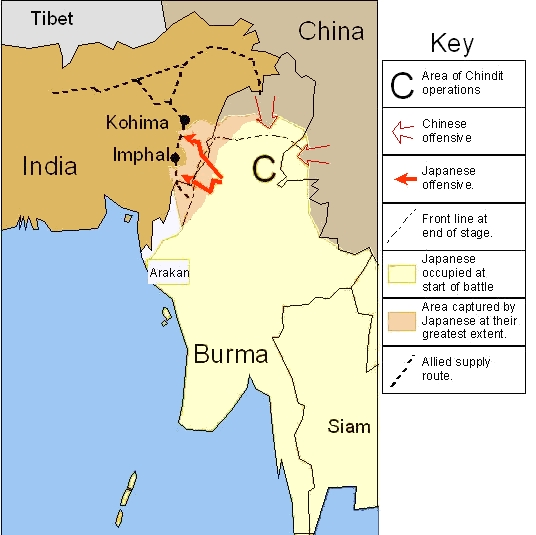
Imphal and Kohima campaign

Starting on 15 March 1944, the Japanese 31st Division crossed the Chindwin River near Homalin and moved north-west along jungle trails on a front almost 60 miles (97 km) wide. Because of a shortage of transport, half the artillery regiment's mountain guns and the infantry regiments' heavy weapons were left behind. Only three weeks' supply of food and ammunition was carried.

Although the march was arduous, good progress was made. The left wing of the division, consisting of the bulk of the 58th Regiment and commanded by the division's Infantry Group commander, (Note: A Japanese Infantry Division had a separate "Infantry Group" or "Infantry Brigade" headquarters which, as in this case, could control any substantial detachment from the main body of the division) Major General Shigesaburō Miyazaki, was ahead of the neighbouring formation (the Japanese 15th Infantry Division) when they clashed with Indian troops covering the northern approaches to Imphal on 20 March.

The Indian troops were the 50th Indian Parachute Brigade under Brigadier Maxwell Hope-Thomson, at Sangshak. Although they were not Miyazaki's objective, he decided to clear them from his line of advance. The Battle of Sangshak continued for six days. The parachute brigade's troops were desperately short of drinking water, but Miyazaki was handicapped by lack of artillery until near the end of the battle. Eventually, as some of the Japanese 15th Division's troops joined the battle, Hope-Thomson withdrew. The 50th Parachute Brigade lost 600 men, while the Japanese had suffered over 400 casualties. Miyazaki had also captured some of the food and munitions that had been dropped by the Royal Air Force (RAF) to the defenders of Sangshak. However, his troops, who had the shortest and easiest route to Kohima, were delayed by a week.

Meanwhile, the commander of the British Fourteenth Army, Lieutenant General William Slim, belatedly realised (partly from Japanese documents that had been captured at Sangshak) that a whole Japanese division was moving towards Kohima. He and his staff had originally believed that, because of the forbidding terrain in the area, the Japanese would only be able to send a regiment to take Kohima. (Note: A Japanese regiment was approximately 2,600 men, while a division varied between 12,000 and 22,000 men.)

Slim knew that there were few fighting troops, as opposed to soldiers in line-of-communication units and supporting services, in Kohima and none at all at the vital base of Dimapur 30 miles (48 km) to the north. Dimapur contained an area of supply dumps 11 miles (18 km) long and 1 mile (1.6 km) wide. As the fall of Dimapur would have been disastrous for the Allies, Slim asked his superior, General George Giffard (commanding Eleventh Army Group), for more troops to protect Dimapur and to prepare to relieve Imphal.

The Allies were already hastily reinforcing the Imphal Front. As part of this move, the infantry and artillery of the 5th Indian Infantry Division were flown from the Arakan, where they had just participated in the defeat of a subsidiary Japanese offensive at the Battle of the Admin Box. While the main body of the division went to Imphal (where some units had been isolated and almost all of IV Corps' reserves had already been committed), the 161st Indian Infantry Brigade, commanded by Brigadier Dermot Warren and with 24th Mountain Artillery Regiment, Indian Artillery attached, were flown to Dimapur.

Early in March, the 23rd Long Range Penetration Brigade was removed from Major General Orde Wingate's Chindit force, and was dispatched by rail from around Lalaghat to Jorhat, 50 miles (80 km) north of Dimapur, where they could threaten the flank of any Japanese attack on the base. Giffard and General Claude Auchinleck, the Commander-in-Chief of the British Indian Army, also prepared to send the British 2nd Division and Indian XXXIII Corps HQ under Lieutenant General Montagu Stopford from reserve in southern and central India to Dimapur, by road and rail.

Until XXXIII Corps headquarters could arrive at Dimapur, the HQ of 202 Line of Communication Area under Major General Robert Philip Lancaster-Ranking took command of the area.

== Battle ==
=== Geography ===
Kohima's strategic importance in the wider 1944 Japanese Chindwin offensive lay in that it was the summit of a pass that offered the Japanese the best route from Burma into India. Through it ran the road which was the main supply route between the base at Dimapur in the Brahmaputra River valley and Imphal, where the British and Indian troops of IV Corps (consisting of the 17th, 20th and 23rd Indian Infantry Divisions) faced the main Japanese offensive.

Kohima Ridge itself runs roughly north and south. The road from Dimapur to Imphal climbs to its northern end and runs along its eastern face. In 1944, Kohima was the administrative centre of Nagaland. The Deputy Commissioner was Charles Pawsey. His bungalow stood on the hillside at a bend in the road, with its gardens and tennis court, and a clubhouse, on terraces above. Although some terraces around the village were cleared for cultivation, the steep slopes of the ridge were densely forested.

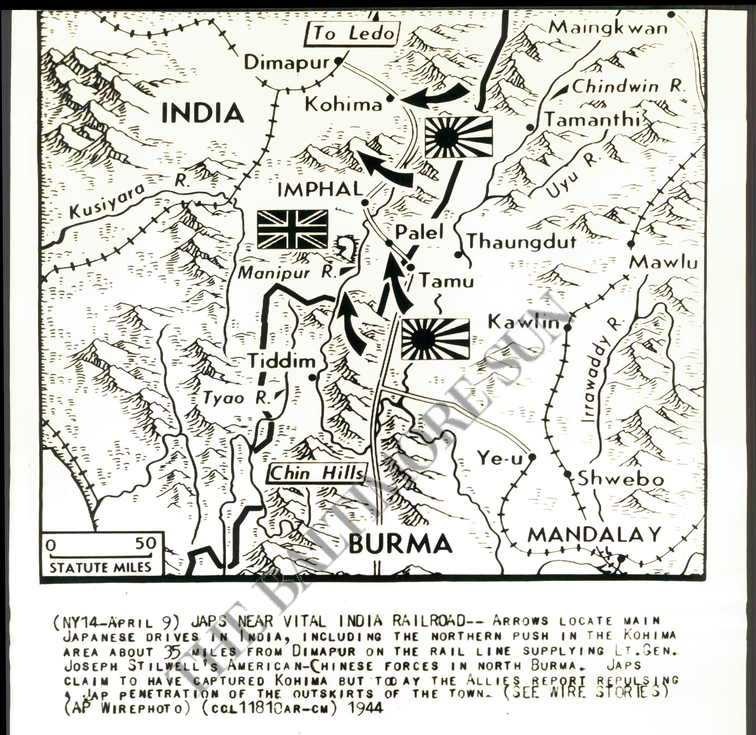
News image showing the Japanese Army approaching Kohima.

North of the ridge lay the densely inhabited area of Naga Village, crowned by Treasury Hill, and Church Knoll (Baptist and other Christian missionaries had been active in Nagaland over the preceding half century). South and west of Kohima Ridge were GPT Ridge and the jungle-covered Aradura Spur. The various British and Indian service troop encampments in the area gave their names to the features which were to be important in the battle e.g. "Field Supply Depot" became FSD Hill or merely FSD. The Japanese later assigned their own code-names to the features; for example, Garrison Hill, which overlooked Kohima, was known as Inu (dog) and Kuki Piquet (see map of Kohima Ridge) as Saru (monkey).

=== Siege ===
Before the 161st Indian Brigade arrived, the only fighting troops in the Kohima area were the newly raised 1st Battalion, the Assam Regiment and a few platoons from the 3rd (Naga Hills) Battalion of the paramilitary Assam Rifles. Late in March 161st Brigade deployed in Kohima, but Major-General Ranking ordered them back to Dimapur, as it was felt initially that Dimapur had more strategic importance. Kohima was regarded as a roadblock, while Dimapur was the railhead where the majority of Allied supplies were stored. Slim also feared that the Japanese might leave only a detachment to contain the garrison of Kohima while the main body of the 31st Division moved by tracks to the east to attack Dimapur.

To Slim's relief, Satō concentrated on capturing Kohima. (Early in the siege, on 8 April, Mutaguchi directly ordered Sato to send a detachment to advance on Dimapur. Satō unwillingly dispatched a battalion of the 138th Regiment but a few hours later Mutaguchi's superior, Lieutenant General Masakasu Kawabe commanding Burma Area Army, vetoed the move.)

As the right wing and centre of the Japanese 31st Division approached Jessami, over 80 miles (130 km) by road to the east of Kohima, elements of the Assam Regiment fought delaying actions against them commencing on 1 April. Nevertheless, the men in the forward positions were soon overrun and the Assam regiment was ordered to withdraw. By the night of 3 April, Miyazaki's troops reached the outskirts of the Naga village and began probing Kohima from the south.

Stopford's Corps HQ took over responsibility for the front from Ranking on 3 April. The next day, he ordered the 161st Indian Brigade to move forward to Kohima again, but only one battalion, 4th Battalion Queen's Own Royal West Kent Regiment commanded by Lieutenant Colonel John Laverty, and a company of the 4th Battalion, 7th Rajput Regiment arrived in Kohima before the Japanese cut the road west of the ridge. Besides these troops from 161st Brigade, the garrison consisted of a raw battalion (the Shere Regiment) from the Royal Nepalese Army, some companies from the Burma Regiment, some of the Assam Regiment which had retired to Kohima and various detachments of convalescents and line-of-communication troops. The garrison numbered about 2,500, of which about 1,000 were non-combatants and was commanded by Colonel Hugh Richards, who had served formerly with the Chindits.

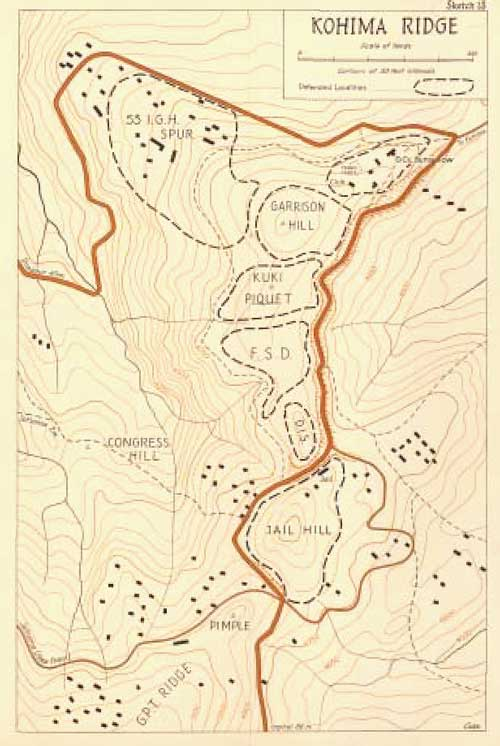
Kohima Ridge

The siege began on 6 April. The garrison was continually shelled and mortared, in many instances by Japanese using weapons and ammunition captured at Sangshak and from other depots, and was slowly driven into a small perimeter on Garrison Hill. They had artillery support from the main body of 161st Brigade, who were themselves cut off 2 miles (3.2 km) away at Jotsoma, but, as at Sangshak, they were very short of drinking water. The water supply point was on GPT Ridge, which was captured by the Japanese on the first day of the siege. Some of its defenders were unable to retreat to other positions on the ridge and instead withdrew towards Dimapur. Canvas water tanks on FSD and at the Indian General Hospital had neither been filled nor dug in to protect them from fire. While a small spring was discovered on the north side of Garrison Hill, it could be reached only at night. The medical dressing stations were exposed to Japanese fire, and wounded men were often hit again as they waited for treatment.

Some of the heaviest fighting took place at the north end of Kohima Ridge, around the Deputy Commissioner's bungalow and tennis court, in what became known as the Battle of the Tennis Court. The tennis court became a no man's land, with the Japanese and the defenders of Kohima dug in on opposite sides, so close to each other that grenades were thrown between the trenches. The American historians Alan Millet and Williamson Murray wrote about the fighting at Kohima between the Japanese vs. the Anglo-Indian troops: "Nowhere in World War II – even on the Eastern Front – did the combatants fight with more mindless savagery".

On the night of 17/18 April, the Japanese finally captured the DC's bungalow area. Other Japanese captured Kuki Picquet, cutting the garrison in two. The defenders' situation was desperate, but the Japanese did not follow up by attacking Garrison Hill as by now they were exhausted by hunger and by the fighting, and when daylight broke, troops of 161st Indian Brigade arrived to relieve the garrison.

=== Relief ===
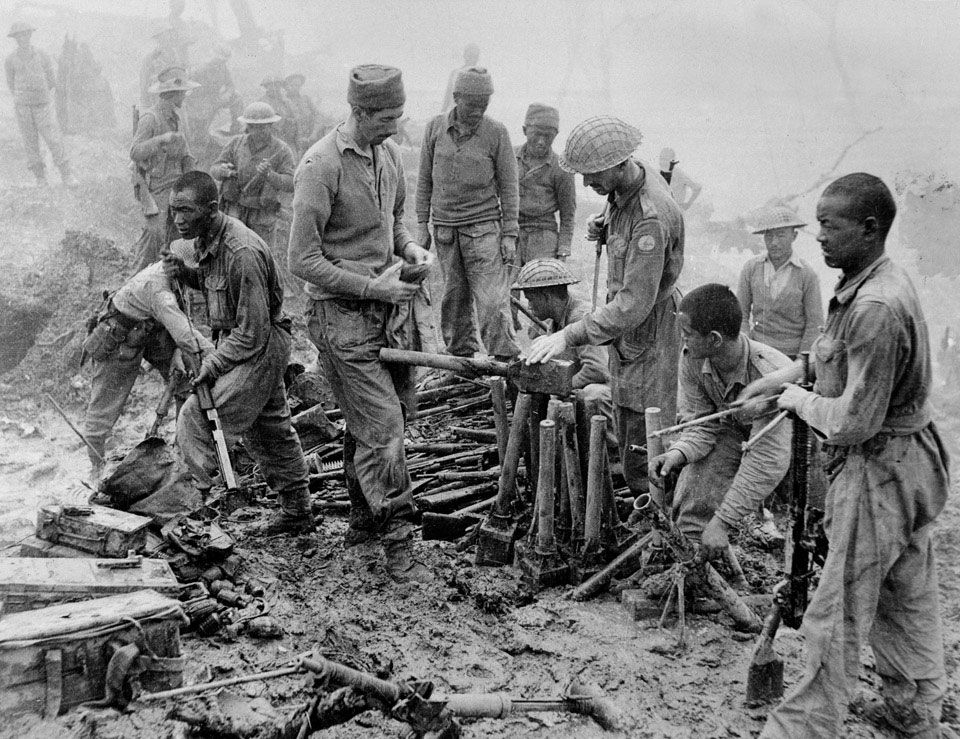
Indian soldiers of the British Indian Army inspect captured Japanese ordnance during the Kohima battle, April 1944

The British 2nd Division, commanded by Major General John M. L. Grover, had begun to arrive at Dimapur in early April. By 11 April, the Fourteenth Army had about the same number of troops in the area as the Japanese. The British 5th Brigade of the 2nd Division broke through Japanese roadblocks to relieve 161st Brigade in Jotsoma on 15 April. The British 6th Brigade took over 161st Brigade's defensive position (the "Jotsoma Box"), allowing the 161st Brigade with air, artillery and armour support to launch an attack towards Kohima on 18 April. After a day's heavy fighting, the leading troops of the Brigade (1st Battalion, 1st Punjab Regiment and tanks of the 149 Regiment Royal Armoured Corps) broke through and started to relieve the Kohima garrison. By this point, Kohima resembled a battlefield from the First World War, with smashed trees, ruined buildings and the ground covered in craters.

Under cover of darkness, the wounded (numbering 300) were brought out under fire. Although contact had been established, it took a further 24 hours to fully secure the road between Jotsoma and Kohima. During 19 April and into the early hours of 20 April, the British 6th Brigade replaced the original garrison and at 06:00 hours on 20 April, the garrison commander (Colonel Richards) handed over command of the area. 6th Brigade observers were taken aback by the condition of the garrison; one battle hardened officer commented: "They looked like aged, bloodstained scarecrows, dropping with fatigue; the only clean thing about them was their weapons, and they smelt of blood, sweat and death."

Miyazaki continued to try to capture Garrison Hill, and there was heavy fighting for this position for several more nights, with high casualties on both sides. The Japanese positions on Kuki Picquet were only 50 yards (46 m) from Garrison Hill, and fighting was often hand-to-hand. On the other flank of Garrison Hill, on the night of 26/27 April, a British attack recaptured the clubhouse above the Deputy Commissioner's bungalow, which overlooked most of the Japanese centre.

=== Counter-offensive ===
The mined tennis court and terraces of the District Commissioner's bungalow in Kohima

The Japanese reorganised their forces for defence. Their Left Force under Miyazaki held Kohima Ridge with four battalions. The divisional HQ under Sato himself and the Centre Force under Colonel Shiraishi held Naga Village with another four battalions. The much smaller Right Force held villages to the north and east.

To support their attack against the Japanese position, the British had amassed thirty-eight 3.7 Inch Mountain Howitzers, forty-eight 25-pounder field guns and two 5.5-inch medium guns. The RAF (chiefly Hurricane fighter-bombers of 34 Squadron and Vultee Vengeance dive-bombers of 84 Squadron) also bombed and strafed the Japanese positions. The Japanese could oppose them with only seventeen light mountain guns, with very little ammunition. Nevertheless, the progress of the British counter-attack was slow. Tanks could not easily be used, and the Japanese occupied bunkers which were very deeply dug in, well-concealed and mutually supporting.

While the British 6th Brigade defended Garrison Hill, the other two brigades of 2nd Division tried to outflank both ends of the Japanese position, in Naga Village to the north and on GPT Ridge to the south. The monsoon had broken by this time and the steep slopes were covered in mud, making movement and supply very difficult. In places the British 4th Brigade had to cut steps up hillsides and build handrails in order to make progress. On 4 May, the British 5th Brigade secured a foothold in the outskirts of Naga Village but lost it to a counter-attack. On the same day, the British 4th Brigade, having made a long flank march around Mount Pulebadze to approach Kohima Ridge from the south-west, attacked GPT Ridge in driving rain and captured part of the ridge by surprise but were unable to secure the entire ridge. Two successive commanders of British 4th Brigade were killed in the subsequent close-range fighting on the ridge.

Both outflanking moves having failed because of the terrain and the weather, the British 2nd Division concentrated on attacking the Japanese positions along Kohima Ridge from 4 May onwards. Fire from Japanese posts on the reverse slope of GPT Ridge repeatedly caught British troops attacking Jail Hill in the flank, inflicting heavy casualties and preventing them from capturing the hill for a week. However, the various positions were slowly taken. Jail Hill, together with Kuki Picquet, FSD and DIS, was finally captured on 11 May, after a barrage of smoke shells blinded the Japanese machine-gunners and allowed the troops to secure the hill and dig in.

The last Japanese positions on the ridge to be captured were the tennis court and gardens above the Deputy Commissioner's bungalow. On 13 May, after several failed attempts to outflank or storm the position, the British finally bulldozed a track to the summit above the position, up which a tank could be dragged. A Lee tank crashed down onto the tennis court and destroyed the Japanese trenches and bunkers there. The 2nd Bn, the Dorsetshire Regiment, followed up and captured the hillside where the bungalow formerly stood, thus finally clearing Kohima Ridge. The terrain had been reduced to a fly and rat-infested wilderness, with half-buried human remains everywhere. The conditions under which the Japanese troops had lived and fought have been described by several sources, including author Frank McLynn, as "unspeakable".

The situation worsened for the Japanese as yet more Allied reinforcements arrived. The 7th Indian Infantry Division, commanded by Major General Frank Messervy, was arriving piecemeal by road and rail from the Arakan. Its 33rd Indian Brigade had already been released from XXXIII Corps reserve to join the fighting on Kohima Ridge on 4 May. The 114th Indian Infantry Brigade and the Division HQ arrived on 12 May and (with 161st Brigade under command) the division concentrated on recapturing the Naga Village from the north. The independent 268th Indian Infantry Brigade was used to relieve the brigades of British 2nd Division and allow them to rest, before they resumed their drive southwards along the Imphal Road.

Nevertheless, when the Allies launched another attack on 16 May, the Japanese continued to defend Naga Village and Aradura Spur tenaciously. An attack on Naga Hill on the night of 24/25 May gained no ground. Another attack, mounted against both ends of Aradura Spur on the night of 28/29 May was even more decisively repulsed. The repeated setbacks, with exhaustion and the effects of the climate began to affect the morale of the British 2nd Division especially.

=== Japanese retreat ===
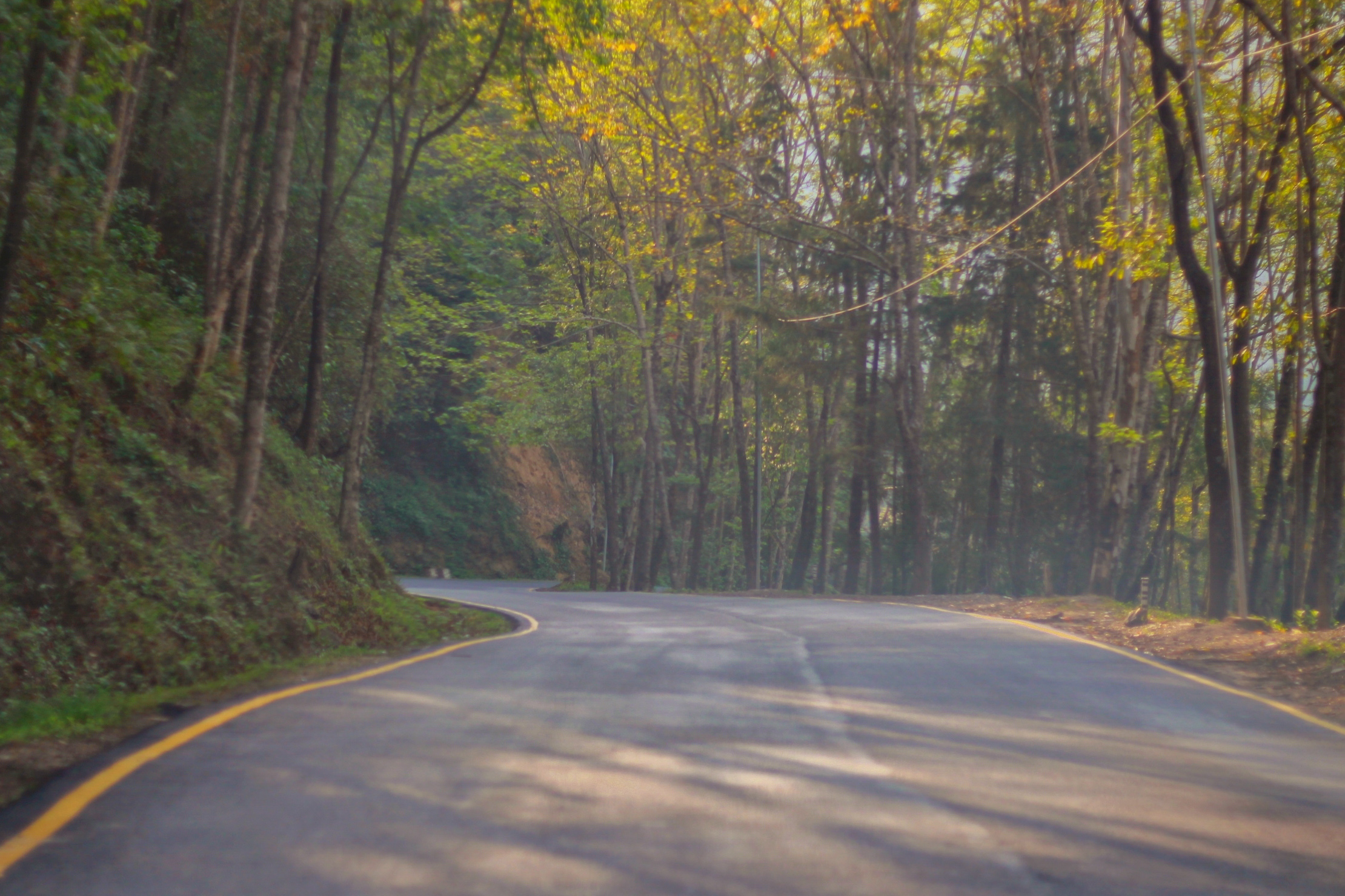
Historic Kohima–Imphal road in 2018

The decisive factor was the Japanese lack of supplies. The Japanese 31st Division had begun the operation with only three weeks' supply of food. Once these supplies were exhausted, the Japanese had to exist on meagre captured stocks and what they could forage in increasingly hostile local villages. (Shortly before the siege of Kohima began, the Japanese had captured a huge warehouse in Naga Village with enough rice to feed the division "for three years", but it was immediately bombed and the stock of rice was destroyed.) The British 23rd LRP Brigade, which had been operating behind the Japanese division, cut the Japanese supply lines and prevented them foraging in the Naga Hills to the east of Kohima. The Japanese had mounted two resupply missions, using captured jeeps to carry supplies forward from the Chindwin to 31st Division, but they brought mainly artillery and anti-tank ammunition, rather than food.

By the middle of May, Satō's troops were starving. He considered that Mutaguchi and the HQ of Japanese Fifteenth Army were taking little notice of his situation, as they had issued several confusing and contradictory orders to him during April. Because the main attack on Imphal faltered around the middle of April, Mutaguchi wished 31st Division or parts of it to join in the attack on Imphal from the north, even while the division was struggling to capture and hold Kohima. Satō considered that Fifteenth Army headquarters were issuing unrealistic orders to his division without proper planning or consideration for the conditions. Nor did he believe that they were exerting themselves to move supplies to his division. He began considering pulling his troops back to allow for resupply.

On 25 May, Satō notified Fifteenth Army HQ that he would withdraw on 1 June, unless his division received supplies. Finally on 31 May, he abandoned Naga Village and other positions north of the road, in spite of orders from Mutaguchi to hang on to his position. (For a divisional commander to retreat without orders or permission from his superior was unheard-of in the Japanese Army.) This allowed XXXIII Corps to outflank Miyazaki's position on Aradura Spur and begin pushing south.

Miyazaki's detachment continued to fight rearguard actions and demolish bridges along the road to Imphal, but was eventually driven off the road and forced to retreat eastwards. The remainder of the Japanese division retreated painfully south but found very little to eat, as most of what few supplies had been brought forward across the Chindwin had been consumed by other Japanese units, who were as desperately hungry as Satō's men. Many of the 31st Division were too enfeebled to drag themselves further south than Ukhrul (near the Sangshak battlefield), where hospitals had been set up (but with no medicines, medical staff or food), or Humine 20 miles (32 km) south of Ukhrul, where Sato vainly hoped to find supplies.

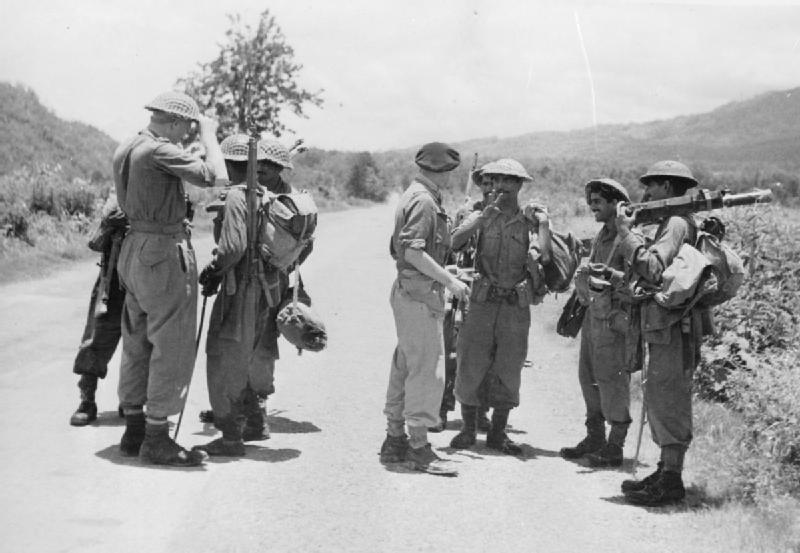
The link-up at Milestone 109 between the two arms of the 14th Army which relieved the Japanese siege of Imphal.

Indian XXXIII Corps followed up the retreating Japanese. The British 2nd Division advanced down the main road, while the 7th Indian Division (using mules and jeeps for most of its transport), moved through the rough terrain east of the road. On 22 June, the leading troops of British 2nd Division met the main body of 5th Indian Infantry Division advancing north from Imphal at Milestone 109, 30 miles (48 km) south of Kohima. The siege of Imphal was over, and truck convoys quickly carried vital heavy supplies to the troops at Imphal.

During the Battle of Kohima, the British and Indian forces had lost 4,064 men, dead, missing and wounded. Against this the Japanese had lost at least 5,764 battle casualties in the Kohima area, and many of the 31st Division subsequently died of disease or starvation, or took their own lives.

== Aftermath ==
After ignoring army orders for several weeks, Satō was removed from command of Japanese 31st Division early in July. The entire Japanese offensive was broken off at the same time. Slim derided Satō as the most unenterprising of his opponents, and even dissuaded the RAF from bombing Satō's HQ because he wanted him kept alive, as doing so would help the Allied cause. Japanese sources, however, blame his superior, Mutaguchi, for both the weaknesses of the original plan, and the antipathy between himself and Sato which led Sato to concentrate on saving his division rather than driving on distant objectives.

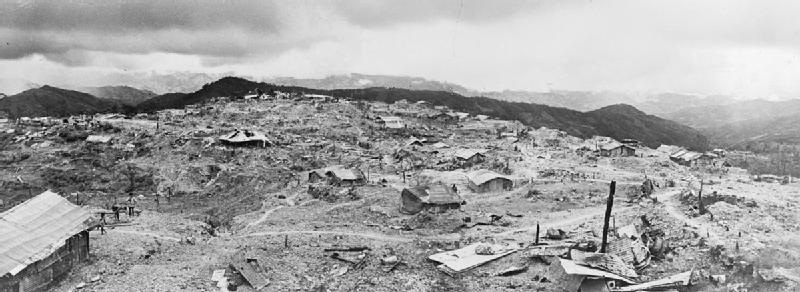
View of Kohima Ridge after the battle.

After Satō was removed from command, he refused an invitation to commit seppuku and demanded a court martial to clear his name and make his complaints about Fifteenth Army HQ public. At Kawabe's prompting, Satō was declared to have suffered a mental breakdown and was unfit to stand trial. He was replaced as commander of the 31st Division by Lieutenant General Tsuchitaro Kawada. Major General Miyazaki was promoted and appointed to command the Japanese 54th Division, serving in Arakan.

The huge losses the Japanese suffered in the Battles of Imphal and Kohima (mainly through starvation and disease) crippled their defence of Burma against Allied attacks during the following year.

On the Allied side, Major General Grover was dismissed from command of the British 2nd Division on 5 July, for perceived slowness in conducting the offensive, and also after complaints about his handling of Indian formations (161st and 33rd Indian Brigades) attached to his division, and replaced by Major General Cameron Nicholson. He accepted his dismissal stoically and was appointed Director of Army Welfare Services at the War Office. Seventy years after the Battle of Kohima a memorial to him was unveiled at Jotsoma, the site of his 2nd Division Headquarters. Brigadier Dermot Warren, who commanded the 161st Indian Brigade during the siege, was promoted to command the 5th Indian Division, but was killed in an air crash the following year.

=== Aerial resupply ===
The aerial resupply of Kohima was part of an effort that, at its height, delivered around 500 tons of supplies per day to Allied forces in the theatre. At the sieges of both Kohima and Imphal, the Allies relied entirely on resupply from the air by British and American aircraft flying from India until the road from the railhead at Dimapur was cleared. At Kohima, due to the narrow ridgelines, accuracy in the dropping of air delivered logistics proved to be a considerable problem and as the fighting intensified and the defended area decreased, the task became harder and more dangerous. In order to improve the accuracy of the drops, the Dakota pilots were forced to fly "dangerously low".

The increasing dominance of Allied airpower by this stage of the Burma campaign was a major factor in helping the Allies turn the tide of the war in this theatre. Allied air supply enabled British and Indian troops to hold out in positions that they might otherwise have had to abandon due to shortages of ammunition, food and water, as reinforcements and supplies could be brought in even when garrisons were surrounded and cut off. Conversely, the Japanese found their own supply situation harder to resolve and in the end it was one of the deciding factors in the battle.

=== Victoria Cross ===
Three Victoria Crosses were awarded for actions during the Battle of Kohima:

- Lance Corporal John Pennington Harman, 4th Battalion, Queen's Own Royal West Kent Regiment, 161st Indian Infantry Brigade, 5th Indian Infantry Division. During heavy fighting around "Detail Hill" (FSD?) during the siege, he single-handedly took out two Japanese machine gun posts, the first on 7/8 April and a second on 8/9 April. He was killed withdrawing from the second attack and was later awarded a posthumous Victoria Cross for these actions.
- Captain John Niel Randle, 2nd Battalion, Royal Norfolk Regiment, 4th Infantry Brigade, 2nd British Infantry Division.
- Jemadar Abdul Hafiz, 9th Jat Regiment. At 18 years old Abdul Hafiz became the youngest VC recipient from the British Indian Army. He is buried in Imphal Indian War Cemetery.

== Legacy ==
=== War Cemetery ===
The War Cemetery in Kohima of 1,420 Allied war dead is maintained by the Commonwealth War Graves Commission. The cemetery lies on the slopes of Garrison Hill, in what was once the Deputy Commissioner's tennis court. The epitaph carved on the memorial of the 2nd British Division in the cemetery has become world-famous as the Kohima Epitaph. It reads:

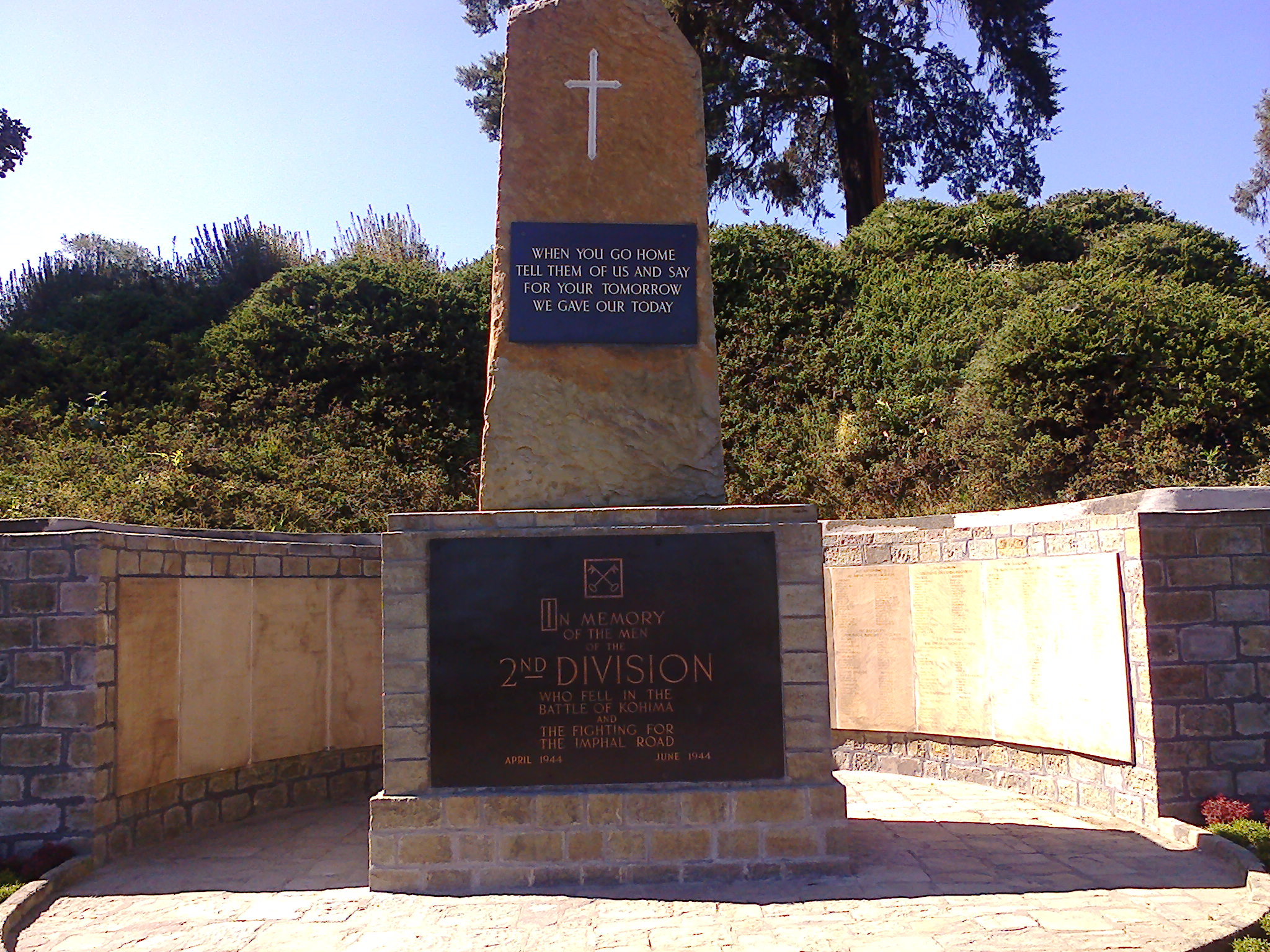
The memorial in Kohima

When you go home, tell them of us and say,
For your tomorrow, we gave our today

The verse is attributed to John Maxwell Edmonds (1875–1958), and is thought to have been inspired by the epitaph written by Simonides to honour the Spartans who fell at the Battle of Thermopylae in 480 BC.

=== Peace Memorial ===
In 2024 the Nagaland Government unveiled the Kohima Peace Memorial along with Hiroshi Suzuki, the Japanese Ambassador to India. The memorial along with the adjoining Eco-Park was funded by the Japan International Cooperation Agency (JICA) through its 'Official Development Assistance' programme. The project was implemented by Nagaland Forest Management Project. The complex also has a museum, stalls, restaurants, and a Japanese kitchen. The museum exhibits contain personal diary excerpts of Japanese and British soldiers documenting their wartime experiences in the area.

== See also ==
- India in World War II

== Bibliography ==
- Allen, Louis (2000) [1984]. Burma: The Longest War 1941–45. London: Phoenix Press. ISBN 978-1-84212-260-0.
- Ashcroft, Michael (2007). Victoria Cross Heroes. London: Headline Review. ISBN 978-0-75531-633-5.
- Brayley, Martin (2002). The British Army 1939–45 (3): The Far East. London: Osprey Publishing. ISBN 978-1-84176-238-8.
- Brett-James, Antony (1951). Ball of Fire: The Fifth Indian Division in the Second World War. Aldershot: Gale & Polden. ISBN 978-1-78331-096-8. OCLC 4275700. Archived from the original on 29 January 2020.
- Dennis, Peter; Lyman, Robert (2010). Kohima 1944: The Battle That Saved India. Osprey. ISBN 978-1-84603-939-3.
- Dougherty, Martin J. (2008). Land Warfare. Thunder Bay Press. ISBN 978-1-59223-829-3.
- Fowler, William (2009). We Gave Our Today: Burma 1941–1945. Hachette. ISBN 978-0-29785-761-7.
- Hantzis, Steven James (2017). Rails of War: Supplying the Americans and Their Allies in China-Burma-India. Lincoln: University of Nebraska Press. ISBN 978-1-61234-937-4.
- Keane, Fergal (2010). Road of Bones: The Siege of Kohima 1944. London: HarperPress. ISBN 978-0-00713-240-9.
- Luto, James (2013). Fighting with the Fourteenth Army in Burma. Pen and Sword Military. ISBN 978-1-78303-031-6.
- Ministry of Defence (2004). 60th Second World War Anniversary—The Battle of Kohima, North East India, 4 April – 22 June 1944 (PDF). Ministry of Defence.
- McLynn, Frank (2011). The Burma Campaign: Disaster Into Triumph, 1942–45. New Haven: Yale University Press. ISBN 978-0-30017-162-4.
- Murray, Williamson; Millet, Alan (2000). A War To Be Won. Cambridge, Mass.: Harvard. ISBN 978-0-67400-163-3.
- Ritter, Jonathan Templin (2017). Stillwell and Mountbatten in Burma: Allies at War, 1943–1944. University of North Texas Press. ISBN 978-1-57441-674-9.
- Rooney, David (1992). Burma Victory: Imphal and Kohima, March 1944 to May 1945. London: Cassell. ISBN 978-0-30435-457-3.
- Slim, William (1956). Defeat into Victory. London: Cassell. ISBN 978-0-33050-997-8. OCLC 891162827.
- Swinson, Arthur (2015) [1966]. Kohima. Head of Zeus. ISBN 978-1-78408-177-5.
- Thompson, Julian (2010). Forgotten Voices of Burma: The Second World War's Forgotten Conflict (illustrated, reprint ed.). Random House. ISBN 978-0-09193-237-4.
- Wilson, David (2001). The Sum of Things. Staplehurst: Spellmount. ISBN 978-1-86227-134-0.
