= Shigesaburō Miyazaki =

- 宮崎 繁三郎
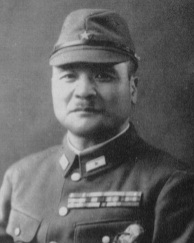
- Born: January 4, 1892; Gifu, Japan
- Died: August 30, 1965 (aged 73); Setagaya, Tokyo, Japan
- Education: Imperial Japanese Army Academy
- Military career
- Allegiance: Empire of Japan
- Branch: Imperial Japanese Army
- Service years: 1911–1945
- Rank: Lieutenant General
- Commands: 31st Division
- Conflicts: Inner Mongolia Campaign; Defense of the Great Wall; World War II; Burma campaign of 1944; Battle of Shangshak; Battle of Kohima
- Other work: Owner of the Gifuya Ceramic retail store

Shigesaburō Miyazaki (宮崎 繁三郎, Miyazaki Shigesaburō; January 4, 1892 – August 30, 1965) was a Japanese major general of the Imperial Japanese Army who was notable for commanding the Japanese 31st Division in the Burma Campaign of 1944. His eldest son was Shigeki Miyazaki who was the former president of Meiji University.

== Biography ==
=== Early years ===
Miyazaki was born in the Gifu Prefecture on January 4, 1892. He graduated from the Gifu Prefectural High School and graduated from the Imperial Japanese Army Academy on the 26th term with his seat being no. 236 out of 736. He was assigned to the 16th Infantry Regiment which was stationed at Shibata, Niigata in December 1911.

=== Battles of Khalkhin Gol ===
After working in the China Group of the General Staff Headquarters, he became an assistant to the Harbin Special Affairs Agency. He was involved in craft activities such as Masahiko Amakasu's goal to destabilize Manchuria and expand the power of the Imperial Japanese Army. A few days after the Liutiaohu Incident, his wife, Akiko, witnessed the scene where Amakura, who visited the official residence in Miyazaki, exploded a grenade as a false flag operation on her way home.

During the Defense of the Great Wall, he was transferred to the 2nd Captain of the 31st Infantry Regiment. He was stationed at the Liu estuary and stayed there for two consecutive nights and on May 10, launched a night attack to succeed the eighth division commanded by Yoshikazu Nishi. For his efforts, he was awarded the tertiary Order of the Golden Kite. After returning to the inland of the unit, he was promoted to Lieutenant Colonel and became the Chief of the Cryptography Group, China Division, General Staff Headquarters. He remained completely indifferent to the faction conflicts within the Army, which peaked at the February 26 Incident, and to the politics of the Army ministry officers.

After working as the Chief of the Guangdong Special Affairs Agency, he served as the Chief of Staff of the Taiwan Army of Japan and the Chief of Staff of the 21st Army, he became the commander of the 16th Infantry Regiment stationed in Manchuria. When the Battles of Khalkhin Gol occurred, he served under the Katayama Detachment of the 2nd Division and led the regiment to participate in the battle at the end of the incident. The troops at the Lake Doroto Highlands were well prepared and attacked at night to rout the Soviet troops. He repelled the next day's counterattack by more than 100 Soviet tanks at great cost. The ceasefire was decided in this state, but Miyazaki gathered soldiers with experience in masonry and buried more than a dozen stone monuments along the front line. In the border development negotiations after the incident, the borders claimed by the Soviet Union and Mongolia were agreed as borders, but in the southern part, which under occupation by the 16th Regiment, Miyazaki's wit set a border favorable to Manchuria and Japan. For his efforts, Miyazaki was awarded the Order of the Rising Sun, 4th class with golden rays.

=== Battle of Imphal ===
After working as the director of the Shanghai Special Affairs Agency, he was the leader of the 26th Brigade of the 13th Division. The 13th Division was seen as the backbone of the planned Chongqing invasion operation at the time. Miyazaki was sent to Burma along with the 58th Infantry Regiment attached to the brigade due to the worsening war situation in the south, and he was supplemented by the 31st Division under the command of Kōtoku Satō.

The Fifteenth Army commander, Renya Mutaguchi issued a reckless operation known as the Battle of Imphal which caused high casualties among the Imperial Japanese Army, blatantly ignoring the supply lines. Miyazaki only commanded the 58th Regiment out of the three regiments under his command, and led 3,000 soldiers, including one mountain gun battalion to capture Kohima, north of Imphal.

The Miyazaki Detachment left Homalin, began heading for Kohima beyond the Mintami Mountains but the Indian 50th Parachute Brigade intercepted but the Japanese took the equipment and routed the Indians at the Battle of Sangshak. After taking a half-day rest here, Miyazaki went north on the Imphal Highway at Tohema between Kohima and Imphal. The British army was fortifying a position in Kohima, but Miyazaki's rapid advance exceeded expectations, and the British Indian Army were surprised to withdraw from the center of Kohima and fled to the hills where the British Attorney's official residence was located southwest of the three-way junction which began the Battle of Kohima. The occupation of Kohima by the 58th Regiment blocked the Imphal Highway between Dimapur and Imphal, which was a supply line to Imphal. Miyazaki was further from the British Commissioner's official residence was ordered to capture the surrounding area, which did not fulfill due to the resistance of the British at the Battle of the Tennis Court. After that, the Miyazaki Detachment stubbornly resisted the Kohima recapture operation carried out by the British Army with two divisions, but suffered great damage without receiving support from other units of the 31st Division, and the number of troops was three minutes of the initial number. It decreased to one. After the retreat of the 31st Division due to the insubordination of Division Commander Satō, Miyazaki was sent an order from the military headquarters ignoring the situation, "Endure on the Imphal Highway until the occupation of Imphal." Miyazaki divided the unit, which had already lost all guns and reduced to 600 infantry, and said

While one resists the British troops, the other repeatedly builds a position on the Imphal highway behind it, gradually moving south on the highway. I made a plan to do it. If you can endure for a month on the road, it would be a world record!

He encouraged the soldiers and boosted their morale, but on the 17th day, their defenses were finally breached by a British tank at Karon, and the supply line to Imphal was regained.

The Miyazaki Detachment, which was surrounded by British troops in the mountainous area to the east of the highway, was finally ordered to withdraw from the military headquarters. With the belief that he would not leave the injured on the battlefield, Miyazaki also carried the injured stretcher and gave him his own food when asked for food. When he found dead or injured soldiers from another party, his body was buried and contained the injured soldiers.

In the troops whose motto was "quality over quantity, sum over quality", Miyazaki always kept "leading in the attack, last in the retreat", and the unit maintained control until the end while suffering great damage.

=== Later in Burma ===
Miyazaki, who became the Commander of the 54th Division after the Battle of Imphal, fought a defense battle near the lower Irrawaddy River in April 1945. However, General Heitarō Kimura, the commander of the Burmese Front, abandoned the headquarters and fled, so the Miyazaki Division, which lost its command system, became completely isolated among the enemies. On the verge of being annihilated, he abandoned his heavy equipment and fled to the bamboo grove of the Bago Mountains, but the 54th Division lost supply and contact, and this time the entire army was on the verge of starvation. There, in late July, they were forced to disperse and attempt to break through the enemy, but many of the soldiers died, and less than half reached the destination on the eastern bank of the Sittang River, initiating the Battle of the Sittang Bend. Miyazaki also persistently developed a defensive battle there, ending the war at Juuejin.

After that, he was detained in a camp in Burma, and when he was a prisoner of war in the British Army, he never fell asleep even if his subordinates were treated improperly, and each time he protested the British Army and protected his subordinates. Miyazaki never abandoned his duty as a commander, even after the battle was over and he was taken prisoner. He returned to Japan in May 1947.

=== Postwar life ===
After returning to Japan, he ran the Gifuya Ceramics Retail Store in a shopping district near the Shimo-kitazawa Station on the Odakyū Odawara Line, and ended his life as a store owner. In 1958, he wrote a memoir entitled Fighting the 16th Infantry Regiment in the magazine "Maru".

Minoru Murata (Lt. Col., Chief of Staff of the 54th Division), who visited the site just before his death, said that Miyazaki had repeatedly said, "Did you definitely take control of the unit that was separated by breaking through the enemy?"
