= Tim Hope-Thomson =

Brigadier Tim Hope-Thomson DSO OBE MC
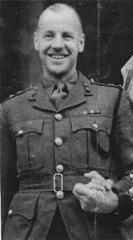
- Hope-Thomson in 1945
- Born: Maxwell Richard Julian Hope-Thomson; 2 May 1911; Edinburgh, Midlothian, Scotland
- Died: 1 June 1990 (aged 79); Kirriemuir, Angus, Scotland
- Alma mater: Wellington College; Royal Military College, Sandhurst
- Spouse: Audrey Anne Mathias (m. 1945; died 1990)
- Military career
- Allegiance: United Kingdom
- Branch: British Army; British Indian Army
- Service years: 1931–1964
- Rank: Brigadier
- Service number: 52731
- Units: Royal Scots Fusiliers; 50th Parachute Brigade; 5th Battalion Dorsetshire Regiment; 1st Battalion, Worcestershire Regiment; Combined Operations Headquarters
- Commands: 50th Parachute Brigade; 1st Battalion Worcestershire Regiment; 4th/5th Battalion Royal Scots Fusiliers; 1st Battalion Royal Scots Fusiliers
- Conflicts: Second World War; Western Front; Burma campaign; Battle of Shangshak
- Awards: Military Cross; Distinguished Service Order; Officer of the Most Excellent Order of the British Empire

Brigadier Maxwell Richard Julian Hope-Thomson DSO OBE MC (2 May 1911 – 1 June 1990), known as Tim Hope-Thomson or M. R. J. Hope Thomson was a British Brigadier and commander of the 50th Parachute Brigade during the Battle of Shangshak of the Burma campaign in the Second World War. Between 1962 and 1964, Hope-Thomson was the Aide-de-camp to Queen Elizabeth II.

== Early life ==
Maxwell Richard Julian Hope-Thomson was born in Edinburgh in 1911 to Major James Thomson (1874–1917) of the Royal Artillery who died of wounds sustained in the Balkan Front of the First World War, and Edith Annie Dunbar (1877–1959). Hope-Thomson was educated at Wellington College and the Royal Military College, Sandhurst, graduating from the latter in 1931 as an officer cadet, before being commissioned into the Royal Scots Fusiliers.

== Military career ==
In 1936 Hope-Thomson served as signal officer with the 1st Battalion Royal Scots Fusiliers in Mandatory Palestine. In November 1936 he was awarded the Military Cross (MC) for gallant and distinguished services rendered in connection with the emergency operations in Palestine. In August 1939 he was promoted to the rank of Captain. After the outbreak of the Second World War, Hope-Thomson became an adjutant in the British Expeditionary Force (BEF).

In 1942, Hope-Thomson was briefly the Commanding Officer of the 4th Battalion, Parachute Regiment, an Army Reserve unit.

=== Burma campaign ===
In May 1943, Hope-Thomson replaced Brigadier Gough as commander of the 50th Parachute Brigade, whom at the age of forty-three, was considered too old to command a parachute brigade in action. Upon his appointment, Hope-Thomson became one of the youngest brigade commanders in India Command, and possibly in the entire army. In The Battle At Sangshak: Prelude to Kohima, author Harry Seaman wrote that Hope-Thomson was "tall, fair and athletic in build, impassive and reserved in manner, he was a total contrast to his gregarious and extrovert predecessor." He also earnt the nickname "Bonnie Prince Charlie" by some lower-ranked members for wearing the glengarry of the Royal Scots Fusiliers, rather than the customary scarlet-braided cap of his rank.

In 1943, Hope-Thomson was effectively the only airborne expert in India Command, which led to frequent absences advising headquarters, requiring deputies to fill his role. During this time, Bernard Abbot rose to full Colonel, and Paul Hopkinson took command of the 152nd (Indian) Battalion.

=== Battle of Shangshak ===
The first engagement at Shangshak unfolded rapidly in mid-March 1944, as Hope-Thomson's 50th Indian Parachute Brigade was pushed into a role it had neither expected nor been properly prepared to fulfil. On 14 March, the 152nd (Gurkha) Battalion arrived at Shangshak ahead of the rest of the brigade and took over positions vacated by 49 Brigade. In line with the prevailing assumption that the area was quiet, Hope-Thomson's forces were dispersed across a vast area: companies of 152nd Battalion were placed forward at Point 7378 and Sheldon's Corner to watch the approaches from Ukhrul, while 4/5th Mahrattas were held in reserve at Kidney Camp. The brigade was still deploying and lacked full cohesion when reports began to emerge, between 18 and 19 March, of Japanese forces advancing westward. Hope-Thomson's brigade was placed in an exposed, lightly defended area that higher command wrongly believed would see little action. He never received warnings that a large Japanese force was crossing the Chindwin River, so he remained unaware that his small unit faced an imminent attack by an entire division. On 20 March 1944, his troops suddenly spotted large Japanese columns advancing on their exposed position. C Company of the 152nd Battalion, holding a forward hilltop, was surrounded by a much larger Japanese force and fought fiercely despite being heavily outnumbered. After enduring repeated assaults, suffering heavy casualties, and running low on ammunition, the unit was eventually overwhelmed. Even the Japanese account acknowledged the defenders' bravery, noting a final desperate counterattack and an officer's suicide, as well as significant Japanese losses during the battle.

By 21 March, the brigade's situation deteriorated under Japanese pressure. The brigade withdrew from Sheldon's Corner toward Shangshak, where a misdirected supply drop had to be destroyed. On arrival, they found Japanese forces had cut the road to Imphal, making further retreat impossible. Hope-Thomson then concentrated about 1,850 troops into a defensive perimeter in Shangshak. This improved coordination and fire support but created problems, including poor defensive ground, lack of water, and vulnerability to shellfire. On 22 March, Hope-Thomson misidentified an approaching force as his own, but it was actually a Japanese column under Major-General Miyazaki, who, despite Shangshak not being his objective, chose to attack and launched a poorly supported night assault in the early hours of 23 March that was shattered by strong British artillery and mortar fire. The following day, the British, encouraged by their successful defence, briefly held a strong position, but a failed airdrop left them critically short of supplies, forcing them onto the defensive as Japanese forces completed the encirclement, began shelling and night raids, and gradually wore down the exhausted garrison, even as a captured Japanese map with valuable intelligence was sent to higher command but seemingly underused.

By 26 March, with the Japanese tightening their encirclement and no relief in sight, higher command ordered Hope-Thomson to breakout. That night, the garrison withdrew under darkness in scattered groups, after destroying their equipment and leaving behind severely wounded men, ending a costly but determined defense.

Historian Robert Lyman praised Hope-Thomson's actions during the Battle of Shangshak, and said that his plan was a "superb defensive position".

== Personal life ==
Hope-Thomson married Audrey Anne Mathias in 1945 and had two kids. He died in June 1990 in Kirriemuir, Angus, Scotland.

== List of honours ==
Officer of the Most Excellent Order of the British Empire (OBE)	1 January 1951
Distinguished Service Order (DSO)	24 January 1946
Military Cross (MC)	6 November 1936

== See also ==
- List of British generals and brigadiers

== Bibliography ==
- Allen, Louis (1984). Burma: The Longest War. Dent Publishing. ISBN 0-460-02474-4.
- McLynn, Frank (2011). The Burma Campaign: Disaster Into Triumph 1942–45. Yale University Press. ISBN 978-0-300-17162-4.
- Seaman, Harry (1989). The Battle At Sangshak: Prelude to Kohima. Pen and Sword. ISBN 9780850527209.
- Lyman, Robert (9 August 2022). "Sangshak: The First Battle for Kohima". robertlyman.substack.com – via Substack.
- "Recommendation for Award for Hope Thomson | Distinguished Service Order". discovery.nationalarchives.gov.uk. The National Archives. 1946.
- "Recommendation for Award for Hope Thomson | Officer of the Most Excellent Order of the British Empire". discovery.nationalarchives.gov.uk. The National Archives. 1951.
- "No. 34338 | The London Gazette, 6 November 1936". thegazette.co.uk. London Gazette. 6 November 1936. p. 7123.
- "No. 42652 | Supplement to The London Gazette of Tuesday, 17th April 1962". thegazette.co.uk. London Gazette. 17 April 1962. p. 3265.
- "No. 43365 | Supplement to The London Gazette of Tuesday, 23rd June 1964". thegazette.co.uk. London Gazette. 23 June 1964. p. 5529.
