= Burma campaign (1944) =

Aspect of the South-East Asian Theatre of World War II

Burma Campaign 1943–1944
- Part of the Burma campaign of World War II
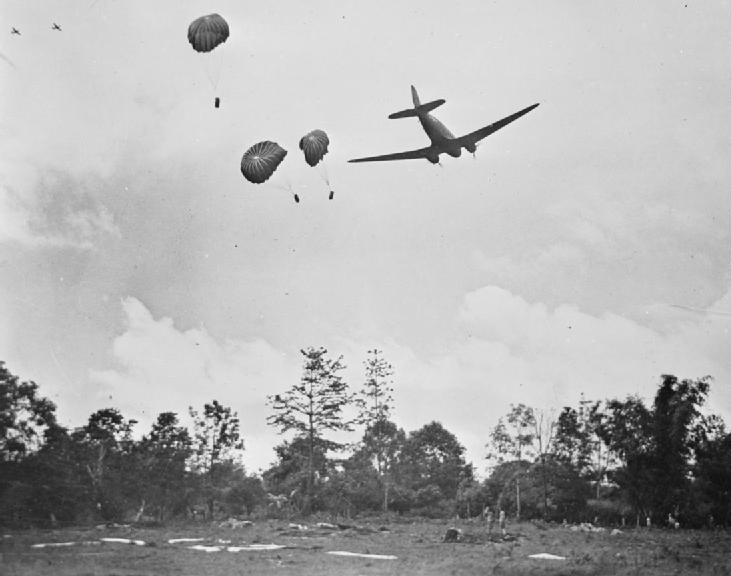
- A C-47 transport aircraft drops supplies by parachute to Allied troops in action against Japanese forces; a common event during the fighting in Burma and India during 1944
Date	October 1943 – November 1944
Location	State of Burma; Assam, British India; Yunnan, Republic of China
Result	Allied victory

Belligerents
United Kingdom and Empire: India; Burma; Gambia; Gold Coast; Kenya; Nigeria; Northern Rhodesia; Southern Rhodesia; Nyasaland; Uganda; Nepal (See also Gurkha) (Republic of China (1912–1949)) China; United States	Japan: (India) Azad Hind (INA)

Commanders and leaders
(United Kingdom) Louis Mountbatten; (United Kingdom) William Slim; (Republic of China (1912–1949)) Wei Lihuang; (United States) Joseph Stilwell	(Empire of Japan) Masakazu Kawabe; (Empire of Japan) Renya Mutaguchi; (India) Subhas Chandra Bose

Casualties and losses
29,324 (British Commonwealth)	71,289 (Japanese)

The fighting in the Burma campaign in 1944 was among the most severe in the South-East Asian Theatre of World War II. It took place along the borders between Burma and India, and Burma and China, and involved the British Commonwealth, Chinese and United States forces, against the forces of Imperial Japan and the Indian National Army. British Commonwealth land forces were drawn primarily from the United Kingdom, British India and Africa.

The Allies had overcome the logistic and organisational difficulties which had crippled their earlier efforts, and they were preparing to invade Japanese-occupied Burma at several widely separated points. The Japanese forestalled them by launching their own offensive into India, and this offensive became larger in scope than originally intended. By the end of the year, the Allies had achieved significant territorial gains only in one sector, the extreme north-east of Burma, but the Japanese attack on India had been defeated with very heavy casualties. This handicapped the Japanese attempts to defend Burma against renewed Allied offensives in the following year.

== Rival plans ==
=== Allied plans ===
After the Japanese invasion of Burma in early 1942, the Allies had launched tentative counterattacks in late 1942 and early 1943, despite lack of preparation and resources. This resulted in an Allied defeat in the coastal Arakan Province of Burma, and a questionable success in the first Chindit long-range raid into Burma (codenamed Operation Longcloth).

In August 1943 the Allies created South East Asia Command (SEAC), a new combined command responsible for the South-East Asian Theatre. Its Commander in Chief was Admiral Louis Mountbatten. This brought a new sense of purpose and in November, when SEAC took over responsibility for Burma, the newly formed British Fourteenth Army was ready to take the offensive. The substantial improvement in the effectiveness of the troops which Fourteenth Army inherited has been credited to its commander, Lieutenant General William Slim. He enforced the use of anti-malarial drugs as part of an emphasis on individual health, established realistic jungle warfare training, rebuilt the army's self-respect by winning easy small-scale victories and developed local military infrastructure.

Slim's efforts were aided by improvements to the Allied lines of communication. By October 1944, capacity on the North-East Indian Railways had been raised from 600 tons a day at the start of the war to 4,400 tons a day. The Allied Eastern Air Command, which consisted mainly of Royal Air Force squadrons but also several units of the Indian Air Force and bomber and transport units of the United States Army Air Forces (USAAF), had gained air superiority and this allowed the Allies to employ new tactics, relying upon air support and aerial resupply of troops.

SEAC had to accommodate several rival plans:

- Admiral Mountbatten, as a naval officer who had previously served as commander of Combined Operations HQ, favoured amphibious landings. The first of these was to be on the Andaman Islands (Operation "Buccaneer"), but the landing craft assigned to the operation were recalled to Europe in preparation for the Normandy Landings.
- The previous year, a British attack into the Burmese coastal province of Arakan had been heavily defeated. Having been reorganised, XV Corps had taken over this part of the front and was preparing to renew the offensive with the aim of capturing Akyab Island, important for its port and airfield. A limited amphibious move (Operation "Pigstick") in support of this attack had to be abandoned for lack of the necessary landing craft and other shipping.

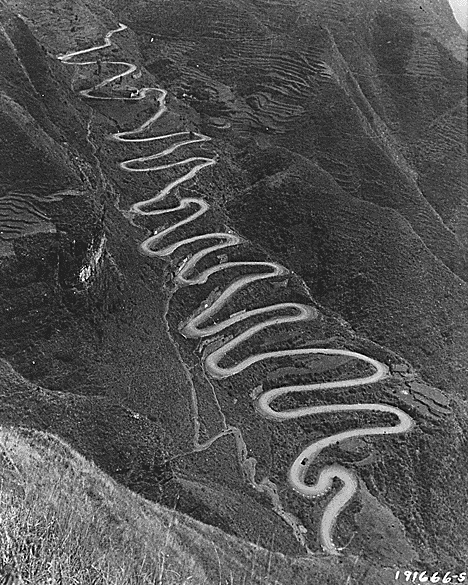
A section of the Ledo Road

- The American aim in the China Burma India Theater was to maintain military aid and supplies to the Republic of China under Chiang Kai-shek, with its wartime capital in Chungking. They had established an air supply route, known as the Hump, over the Himalayas to Kunming in the Chinese province of Yunnan. Some Chinese forces which had retreated into India in early 1942 had been re-equipped and retrained by an American military mission under Lieutenant General Joseph Stilwell, who was also Chief of Staff to Chiang Kai-shek and Deputy Commander of SEAC. Stilwell proposed to construct a new road, the Ledo Road, to link India and China by land, although British leaders were sceptical about the value of this road and the effort devoted to it. By the start of 1944, the new road had reached the far side of the Patkai mountains, and Stilwell was preparing to advance on Kamaing and Myitkyina in northern Burma.
- Chiang Kai-shek had agreed to mount an offensive across the Salween River into eastern Burma from Yunnan. When the Andaman Island landings were cancelled, he claimed this was a breach of faith and cancelled the Yunnan offensive, although he later reinstated it.
- After a long-distance raid (Operation "Longcloth") in 1943 by a long-range penetration force known as the Chindits, British Major-General Orde Wingate had gained approval for the force and its scope of operations to be greatly expanded. This was opposed by Slim and others who felt that this was too great a drain on manpower and resources, but under political pressure from Winston Churchill, Wingate's plans went ahead. The Chindits, designated Indian 3rd Infantry Division for cover purposes, were to assist Stilwell by disrupting the Japanese lines of supply to the northern front.
- Wingate had originally planned that an airborne brigade would capture a Japanese-held airfield at Indaw, which would then be garrisoned by a line infantry division as a base for further Chindit raids. This second part of the plan for Wingate's Special Force, which would have imposed heavy demands on the available transport aircraft and also required troops already allocated to other operations, was later dropped.

After protracted staff discussions within India and between the Allied staffs and commanders in London, Washington and Chungking, the Allied plans for 1944 were reduced to: the offensive by Stilwell's Chinese troops from Ledo; the Chindit operation in support of Stilwell; the renewed overland attack in Arakan; and a rather ill-defined offensive across the Chindwin River from Imphal in support of the other operations.

=== Japanese plans ===
About the same time that SEAC was established, the Japanese had created a new headquarters, Burma Area Army, commanded by Lieutenant General Masakazu Kawabe. Its subordinate formations were the Japanese Fifteenth Army in the north and east of Burma and the Japanese Twenty-Eighth Army in the south and west.

By chance or design, the new commander of Fifteenth Army, Lieutenant General Renya Mutaguchi, had played a major part in many recent Japanese triumphs. He had for example been the officer immediately concerned in the Marco Polo Bridge Incident in 1937, which started hostilities between Japan and China, and stated his belief that it was his destiny to win the war for Japan. He was keen to mount an offensive against India. Burma Area Army originally quashed this idea, but Mutaguchi's persistent advocacy won over officers at Southern Expeditionary Army Group at Singapore, the HQ of all Japanese forces in southern Asia. Finally, Imperial General Headquarters in Tokyo approved Mutaguchi's plan. Officers who opposed Mutaguchi's plans were transferred or sidelined. Neither Kawabe, nor Field Marshal Hisaichi Terauchi, the commander in chief of Southern Expeditionary Army Group, were given any opportunity to veto Mutaguchi's plan, or to control the operation once it had started.

The Japanese were influenced to an unknown degree by Subhas Chandra Bose, commander of the Indian National Army. This was composed largely of Indian soldiers who had been captured in Malaya or Singapore, and some Tamil labourers living in Malaya. At Bose's instigation, a substantial contingent of the INA joined in this Chalo Delhi ("March on Delhi"). Both Bose and Mutaguchi emphasised the advantages which would be gained by a successful attack into India. With misgivings on the part of several of Mutaguchi's superiors and subordinates, Operation U-Go was launched.

== Northern front ==
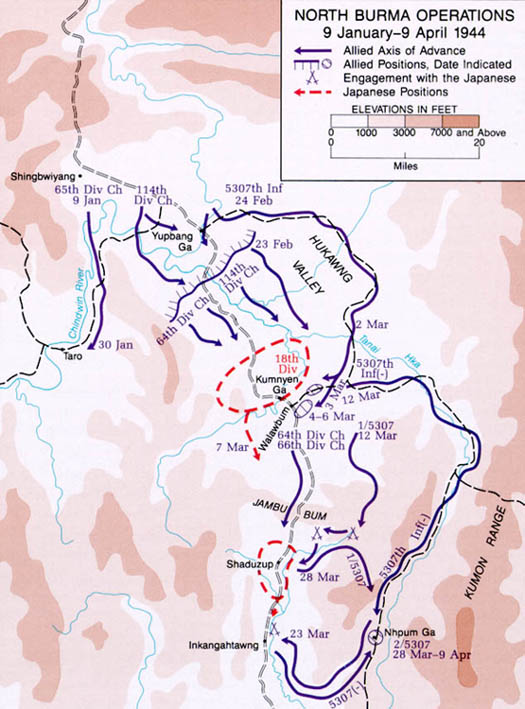
Stilwell's operations in North Burma

Stilwell's forces, the Northern Combat Area Command, initially consisted of two American-equipped Chinese divisions, with a Chinese-manned M3 Light Tank battalion and an American long-range penetration brigade known after its commander as "Merrill's Marauders". Three Chinese divisions were later flown from Yunnan to Ledo to reinforce Stilwell.

In October 1943 the Chinese 38th Division, led by Sun Li-jen, began to advance from Ledo towards Shinbwiyang, while American engineers and Indian labourers extended the Ledo Road behind them. The Japanese 18th Division advanced to the Chindwin to stop them, but found itself outmatched. Whenever the Chinese 22nd and 38th Divisions ran into Japanese strong points, the Marauders were used to outflank Japanese positions by going through the jungle. A technique which had served the Japanese so well earlier in the war before the Allies had learnt the arts of jungle warfare was now being used against them. At Walawbum, for example, if the Chinese 38th Division had been a little swifter and linked up with the Marauders it could have encircled the Japanese 18th Division.

Not only were the Japanese driven back, but the Allies were able to use the trace of the track the Japanese had constructed to supply 18th Division, to speed their construction of the Ledo Road.

=== Second Chindit Expedition ===
In Operation Thursday the Chindits were to support Stilwell's advance by interdicting Japanese supply lines in the region of Indaw. On 5 February 1944, Brigadier Bernard Fergusson's 16th Brigade set out from Ledo, on foot. They crossed exceptionally difficult terrain which the Japanese had not guarded, and penetrated the Japanese rear areas. In early March, three other brigades were flown into landing zones behind Japanese lines by the USAAF 1st Air Commando Group, from where they established strongholds on most of the Japanese road and rail links to their northern front. Over the next two and a half months the Chindits were involved in many very heavy battles with the Japanese.

Brigadier Michael Calvert's 77th Brigade successfully defended one of the landing zones, codenamed "Broadway", and established a road and railway block at Mawlu, north of Indaw. This position, codenamed the "White City", was successfully held for several weeks. Not all communications to the Japanese northern front were blocked, as only a single Chindit battalion operated against the road from Bhamo to Myitkyina, beyond the range of effective Allied air support.

On 24 March, Fergusson's brigade attempted to capture the airfield at Indaw but was repulsed, after which the exhausted brigade was withdrawn to India. On the same day, Wingate, the commander of the Chindits, was killed in an aircrash. His replacement was Brigadier Joe Lentaigne, formerly the commander of the 111th Brigade, one of the Chindit formations.

On 17 May, overall control of the Chindits was transferred from Slim's Fourteenth Army to Stilwell's NCAC. The Chindits evacuated "Broadway" and the "White City", and moved from the Japanese rear areas to new bases closer to Stilwell's front. They were given additional tasks for which they were not equipped. At the same time, the Japanese replaced the scratch "Takē Force" which had been trying to defend their rear areas with the newly formed headquarters of the Japanese Thirty-Third Army, and deployed 53rd Division against the Chindits.

The 111th Brigade, commanded by John Masters, tried to establish another road and rail block codenamed "Blackpool" near Hopin, but were forced to retreat on 25 May after 17 days of battle. The monsoon had broken, making movement difficult and preventing the other Chindit formations reinforcing Masters's brigade.

=== Yunnan Front ===
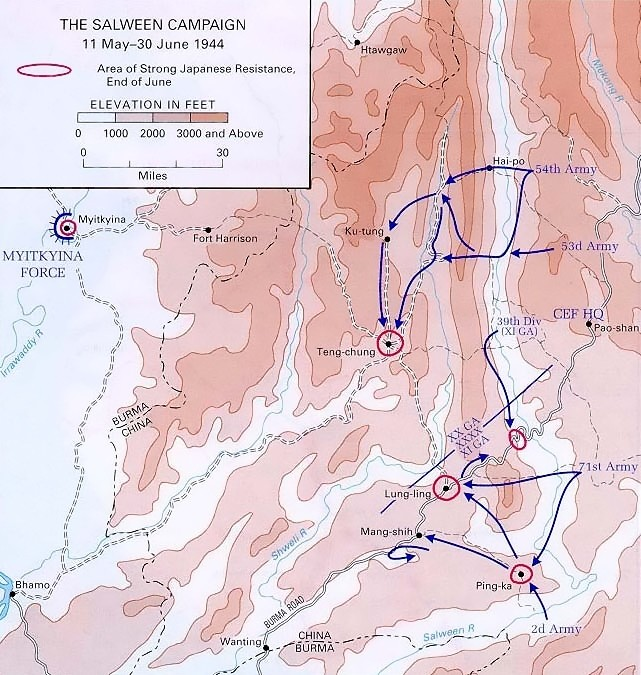
The Salween Campaign, 1944

The Chinese forces on the Yunnan front mounted an attack starting in the second half of April, with nearly 40,000 troops crossing the Salween River on a 200-mile (320 km) front. Within a few days some twelve Chinese Divisions, totalling 72,000 men under the command of General Wei Lihuang, were attacking the Japanese 56th Division. The Japanese forces in the North were now fighting on two fronts, against the Allies from the North West and the Nationalist Chinese from the North East.

The Chinese Yunnan offensive was hampered by the monsoon rains and lack of air support. American observers with the Chinese armies also criticised the Chinese leadership. The Chinese nevertheless succeeded in surrounding the garrison of Tengchung at the end of May. The defenders held out before being annihilated in late September. Further south, the Chinese captured Lungling at the end of August after overcoming determined Japanese resistance, in which the Japanese were helped when Chinese plans and codes fell into their hands by chance. At this point, the Japanese moved reinforcements amounting to a further division in strength to Yunnan and counter-attacked, temporarily halting the Chinese advance.

=== Myitkynia and Mogaung ===
While the Japanese offensive on the Central Front was being waged, Stilwell's forces continued to make gains. On 19 May, the Chinese 22nd and 38th Divisions encircled Kamaing. Two days before, on 17 May, Merrill's forces captured the airfield at Myitkyina after a march across the Kumon Bum Mountains which nearly crippled the already weary Marauders. If Chinese troops from Ledo had been flown in that afternoon to attack the town immediately they could have overwhelmed the small garrison, but support and logistic units were flown in first and the opportunity to capture the town easily was lost, as Japanese reinforcements arrived in the town.

The resulting prolonged siege was not very well directed and cost the allies many men, particularly amongst the Marauders who were kept in the line for reasons of American prestige, and among the Chindits who were forced to remain in the field to disrupt Japanese relief attempts far longer than had been planned. However, because of the deteriorating situation on the other fronts, the Japanese never regained the initiative on the Northern Front.

In late May, Stilwell ordered the Chindits to capture Mogaung to cut the Japanese line of communication to Myitkyina. Calvert's 77th Brigade began the attack, anticipating that the town would be captured by 5 June. The Japanese garrison actually outnumbered the attackers. The 77th Brigade eventually captured Mogaung after a siege which ended on 27 June, at the cost of 50 percent casualties. By July, it had become clear that all the Chindits were exhausted by continuous marching and fighting under heavy monsoon rains, and they were withdrawn. By the end of the campaign the Chindits had lost 1,396 killed and 2,434 wounded. Over half the remainder had to be hospitalised with a special diet afterwards. The British 36th Division was transferred from the Arakan to Stilwell's command to replace the Chindits.

The still continuing siege of Myitkyina resulted in heavy Japanese losses. When the airfield was captured, the Japanese in the town at first intended to fight a delaying action only, aided by the monsoon rains. On 10 July, Major General Genzo Mizukami, who had been sent with reinforcements and placed in charge of the garrison, was ordered personally to "Defend Myitkyina to the death". The Japanese dug in and repelled several Chinese attacks. Further resistance appeared hopeless by the end of July. Mizukami evacuated the survivors of the garrison before fulfilling the letter of his orders by taking his own life inside the defended perimeter. Myitkyina was finally captured on 3 August. The capture of Mogaung and Myitkyina marked the end of the initial phase of Stilwell's campaign. It was the largest seizure of Japanese-held territory to date in the Burma campaign. The airfield at Myitkyina became a vital link in the air route over the Hump.

== Southern front 1943–1944 ==
In Arakan, XV Corps, commanded by Lieutenant General Philip Christison, renewed the advance on the Mayu peninsula. Ranges of steep hills channelled the advance into three attacks; by 5th Indian Division along the coast, 7th Indian Division along the Kalapanzin River and 81st (West Africa) Division along the Kaladan River. The 5th Indian Division captured the small port of Maungdaw on 9 January 1944. The Corps then prepared to capture two disused railway tunnels which linked Maungdaw with the Kalapanzin valley. However, the Japanese struck first. A strong force from the Japanese 55th Division infiltrated Allied lines to attack the 7th Indian Division from the rear, overrunning the divisional HQ.

Unlike previous occasions on which this had happened, the Allied forces stood firm against the attack, and supplies were dropped to them by parachute. In the Battle of the Admin Box from 5–23 February, the Japanese concentrated on XV Corps' Administrative Area, defended mainly by service troops, but they were unable to deal with tanks supporting the defenders. Troops from 5th Indian Division broke through the Ngakyedauk Pass to relieve the defenders of the box. Although battle casualties were approximately equal, the overall result was a heavy Japanese defeat. Their infiltration and encirclement tactics had failed to panic Allied troops, and as the Japanese were unable to capture enemy supplies, they themselves starved.

Two fresh Allied divisions (the 26th Indian Division and the British 36th Division) took over the front in the Mayu peninsula and resumed the offensive. However, XV Corps's offensive wound down over the next few weeks, as the Allies concentrated their resources, particularly transport aircraft, on the Central Front. After capturing the railway tunnels and some hills which dominated the Maungdaw-Buthidaung road, XV Corps halted during the monsoon. Some ground in the malarial Kalapanzin valley was given up to reduce losses to disease, and Japanese counter-attacks forced the isolated 81st (West Africa) Division to retreat up the Kaladan Valley.

== Central front ==
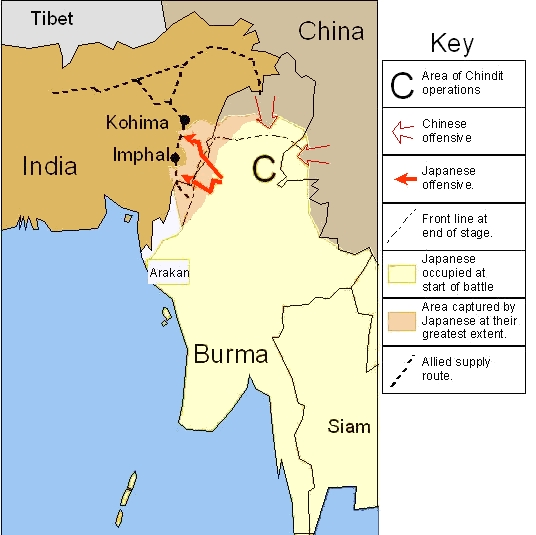
Imphal and Kohima Campaign

At Imphal, IV Corps under Lieutenant-General Geoffry Scoones had pushed forward two divisions to the Chindwin River. One division was in reserve at Imphal. There were indications that a major Japanese offensive was building, and Slim and Scoones planned to withdraw and force the Japanese to fight at the end of impossibly long and difficult supply lines. However, they misjudged the date on which the Japanese were to attack, and the strength they would use against some objectives.

The main body of the Japanese Fifteenth Army, consisting of the 33rd Division, 15th Division and the brigade-sized "Yamamoto Force", planned to cut off and destroy the forward divisions of IV Corps before capturing Imphal. The 31st Division would meanwhile isolate Imphal by capturing Kohima. Mutaguchi intended to exploit this victory by capturing the strategic city of Dimapur, in the Brahmaputra River valley. If this could be achieved, his army would be through the mountainous border region and the whole of North East India would be open to attack. Units of the Indian National Army were to take part in the offensive and raise rebellion in India. The capture of the Dimapur railhead would also sever the land communications to the airbases used to supply the Chinese via the "Hump", and cut off supplies to General Stilwell's forces fighting on the Northern Front.

=== Preliminary battles ===
The Japanese began crossing the Chindwin River on 8 March. Scoones only gave his forward divisions orders to withdraw to Imphal on 13 March. The 20th Indian Division withdrew from Tamu without difficulty, but the 17th Indian Division was cut off at Tiddim by the Japanese 33rd Division. From 18–25 March, the 17th Division was able to fight its way back through four Japanese road blocks, thanks to air re-supply by the RAF and U.S. Troop Carrier Command crews in their Douglas C-47 Skytrains, and assistance from Scoones's reserve, the 23rd Indian Division. The two divisions reached the Imphal plain on 4 April.

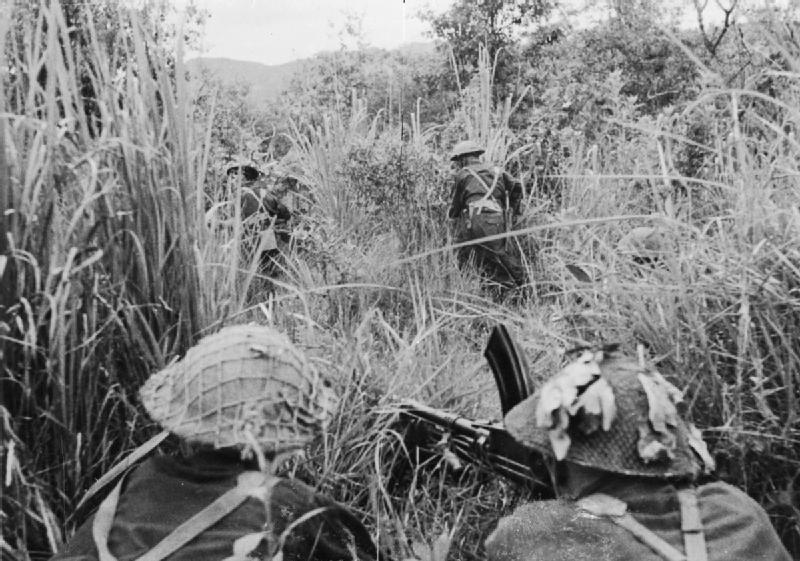
British soldiers search through long grass for Japanese snipers while covered by a Bren gun team

Meanwhile, Imphal had been left vulnerable to the Japanese 15th Division. The only force left covering the northern approaches to the base, 50th Indian Parachute Brigade, was roughly handled at the Battle of Sangshak and forced to withdraw by a regiment from the Japanese 31st Division on its way to Kohima. However, the diversionary attack launched by Japanese 55th division in Arakan had already been defeated, and in late March Slim was able to move the battle-hardened 5th Indian Division, with all its artillery, jeeps, mules and other materiel, by air from Arakan to the Central Front. The move was completed in only eleven days. The division's HQ and two brigades went to Imphal, the other brigade (the 161st Indian Infantry Brigade) went to Dimapur from where it sent a detachment to Kohima.

=== Kohima ===
While the Allied forces in Imphal were cut off and besieged, the Japanese 31st Division, consisting of 20,000 men under Lieutenant-General Kotoku Sato, advanced up the Imphal–Dimapur road. Instead of isolating the small garrison at Kohima and pressing on with his main force to Dimapur, Sato chose to concentrate on capturing the hill station. The Japanese records indicate that Sato (and Mutaguchi's other divisional commanders) had severe misgivings about Fifteenth Army's plan. In particular, they thought the logistic gambles were reckless, and were unwilling to drive on objectives they thought unattainable.

The Battle of Kohima started on 6 April when the Japanese isolated the garrison and tried to dislodge the defenders from their hill top redoubts. Fighting was very heavy around the bungalow and tennis court of the Deputy Commissioner of the Naga Hills. This phase of the battle is often referred to as the Battle of the Tennis Court and was the "high-water mark" of the Japanese attack. On 18 April, the 161st Indian Brigade relieved the defenders, but the battle was not over as the Japanese dug in and defended the positions they had captured.

A new Allied formation HQ, the XXXIII Corps under Lieutenant-General Montagu Stopford, took over operations on this front. The British 2nd Division began a counter-offensive and by 15 May, they had prised the Japanese off Kohima Ridge itself, although the Japanese still held dominating positions north and south of the Ridge. More Allied troops were arriving at Kohima. The 7th Indian Division followed 5th Indian Division from the Arakan, an Indian motor infantry brigade reinforced 2nd Division and a brigade diverted from the Chindit operation cut Japanese 31st Division's supply lines. XXXIII Corps renewed its offensive in the middle of May.

=== Imphal ===
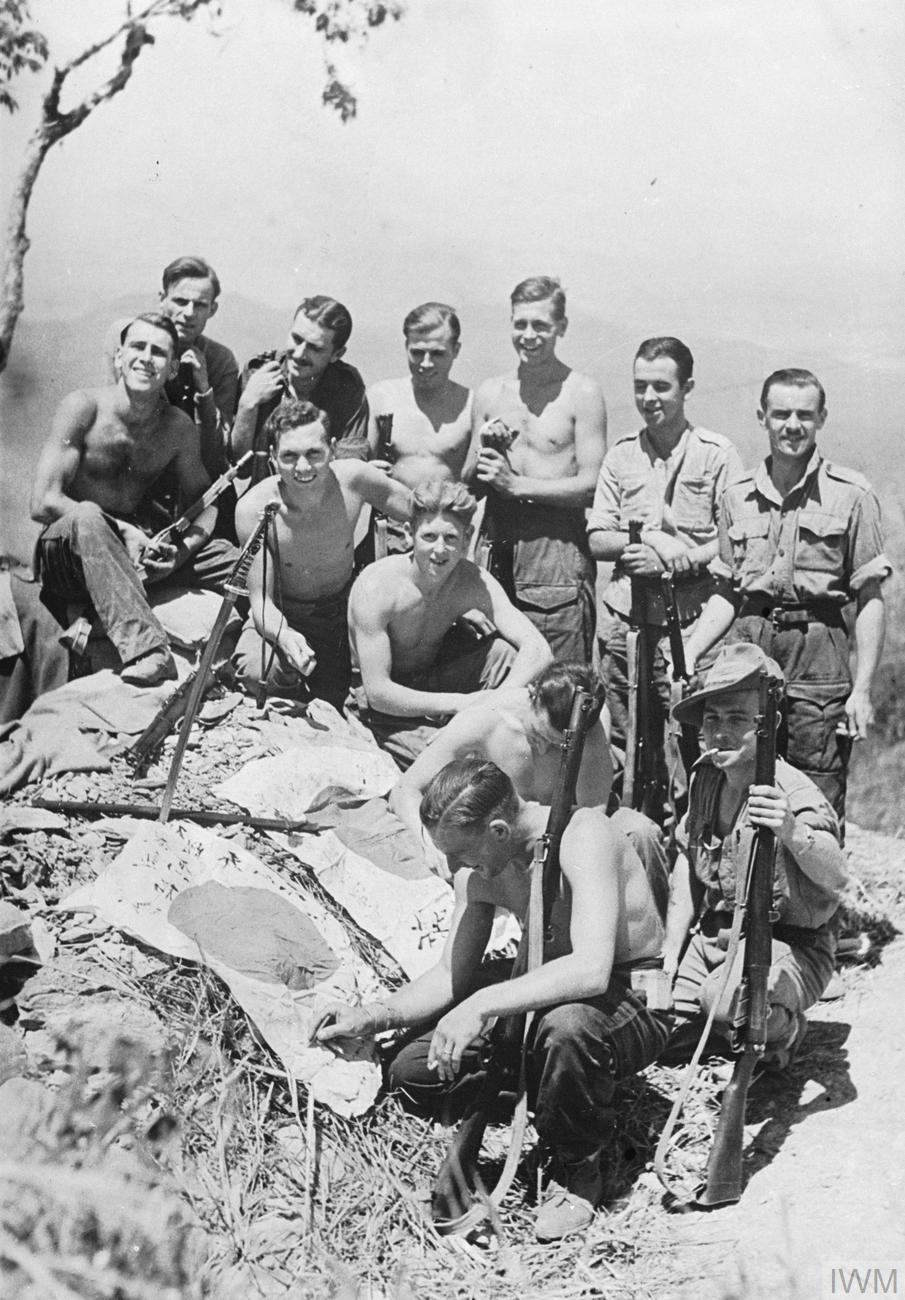
Men of the 1st Battalion, Devonshire Regiment, part of the 80th Indian Infantry Brigade of the 20th Indian Infantry Division, with Japanese flags captured at Nippon Ridge during the Battle of Imphal-Kohima

The Battle of Imphal went badly for the Japanese during April, as their attacks from several directions on the Imphal plain failed to break the Allied defensive ring. The fighting took place in three main sectors. The Japanese 15th Division's attacks from the north were broken when infantry from the 5th Indian Division and M3 Lee tanks recaptured a vital hill at Nungshigum, which overlooked the main airstrip at Imphal, on 13 April. Fighting between Yamamoto Force and the reduced 20th Indian Division swayed back and forth through the hills on either side of the main Imphal-Tamu road throughout the month. The Japanese 33rd Division was slow to throw in its main attack from the south but there was severe fighting around the village of Bishenpur for several weeks.

At the start of May, Slim and Scoones began a counter-offensive against the Japanese 15th Division north of Imphal. Progress was slow. The monsoon had broken, making movement very difficult. Also, IV Corps was suffering some shortages. Although rations and reinforcements were delivered to Imphal by air, artillery ammunition was running short. However, the Japanese were at the end of their endurance. Neither their 31st Division nor 15th Division had received adequate supplies since the offensive began, and during the rains, disease rapidly spread among the starving Japanese troops.

Lieutenant-General Sato had notified Mutaguchi that his division would withdraw from Kohima at the end of May if it were not supplied. In spite of orders to hold on, Sato did indeed begin to retreat, although an independent detachment from his division continued to fight delaying actions along the Imphal Road. Meanwhile, the units of 15th Division were wandering away from their positions to forage for supplies. Its commander, Lieutenant-General Masafumi Yamauchi (who was mortally ill), was dismissed but this could not affect matters. The leading British and Indian troops of IV Corps and XXXIII Corps met at Milestone 109 on the Dimapur-Imphal road on 22 June, and the siege of Imphal was raised.

Mutaguchi (and Kawabe) nevertheless continued to order renewed attacks. 33rd Division (under a new forceful commander, Lieutenant-General Nobuo Tanaka), and Yamamoto Force made repeated efforts south of Imphal, but by the end of June they had suffered so many casualties both from battle and disease that they were unable to make any progress. The Allies had in the meantime cleared large numbers of starving and disordered Japanese troops in and around Ukhrul (near Sangshak) north of Imphal. The Japanese Imphal operation was finally broken off early in July, and they retreated painfully to the Chindwin River.

=== Aftermath ===
The attempted invasion of India was the largest defeat to that date in Japanese history. They had suffered 55,000 casualties, including 13,500 dead. Most of these losses were the result of disease, malnutrition and exhaustion. The Allies suffered 17,500 casualties. Mutaguchi was relieved of his command and left Burma for Singapore in disgrace. Sato refused to commit Seppuku (hara-kiri) when handed a sword by Colonel Shumei Kinoshita, insisting that the defeat had not been his doing. He was examined by doctors who stated that his mental health was such that he could not be court-martialled, probably under pressure from Kawabe and Terauchi, who did not wish a public scandal.

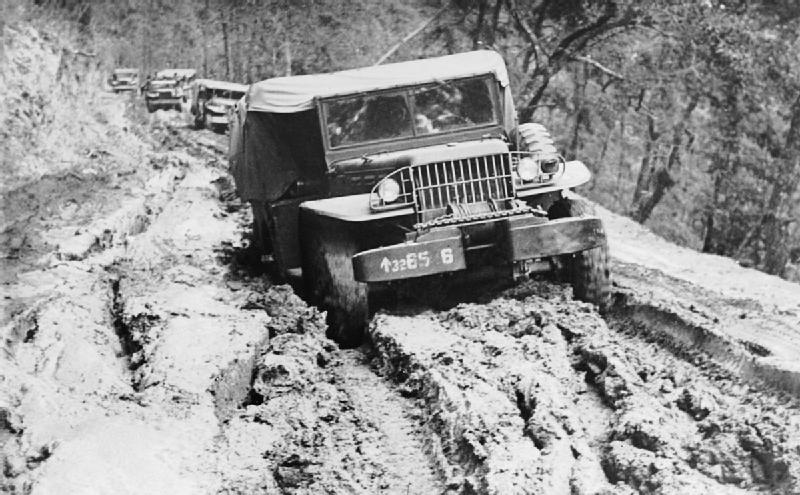
Dodge Weapon Carrier transport on the Tiddim Road during the monsoon

From August to November, Fourteenth Army pursued the Japanese to the Chindwin River despite heavy monsoon rains. While the newly arrived 11th East Africa Division advanced down the Kabaw Valley from Tamu and improved the road behind them, the 5th Indian Division advanced along the mountainous Tiddim road. As Fourteenth Army planned to use only the Kabaw Valley route for supply during the next season's campaign, the Tiddim Road (which included evocatively named stretches such as the "Chocolate Staircase") was allowed to fall into ruin behind the 5th Division, which was supplied entirely by parachute drops. An improvised light formation, the Lushai Brigade, was used to interrupt the lines of communication of the Japanese defending the road. By the end of November, Kalewa (an important river port on the Chindwin) had been recaptured, and several bridgeheads had been established on the east bank of the Chindwin.

Slim and his Corps commanders (Scoones, Christison and Stopford) were knighted in front of Scottish, Gurkha and Punjab regiments by the viceroy Lord Wavell in a ceremony at Imphal in December.
