= Robert Brocklesby Davis =

British-born psychiatrist (1911-1980)

Robert Brocklesby Davis M.B.B.S.

Superintendent of Central Institute of Psychiatry
- In office 11 March 1946 – 24 March 1955
- Preceded by: Capt. C.W.E. Peters
- Succeeded by: Dr. L. P Verma

Personal details
- Born: 27 December 1911 Amritsar, Punjab
- Died: 7 October 1980 (aged 68) Charlottesville, US
- Relations: Edith Turner (sister); Victor Turner (brother-in-law)
- Education: Cambridge University
- Awards: Padma Shri; 1966
- Military career
- Rank: Honorary Lieutenant Colonel
- Conflicts: Battle of Shangshak
- Awards: Distinguished Service Order; 1944
- Medical career
- Institutions: Central Institute of Psychiatry

Robert Brocklesby Davis (27 December 1911 – 7 October 1980) was a British-born psychiatrist known for his contributions to mental health care and education in India.

== Early life and education ==
Davis was born on 27 December 1911 in Amritsar to Dr. George Brocklesby Davis, a missionary doctor, and Lucy Howard, a missionary schoolteacher. He was the eldest of eight children. In 1919, amidst political unrest against britishers in British India, his family relocated to Ely, England.

He was educated at Stowe School in Buckinghamshire and earned a B.A. in Anatomy, Physiology, and Psychology from Cambridge University in 1932. Davis completed his M.R.C.S. & L.R.C.P. in 1935 and his M.B.B.S. from Cambridge in 1936. During his house appointments at London Hospital in 1935-36, he received the London Hospital Prize in Clinical Medicine and Surgery.

== Career ==
=== Indian Medical Service ===
Davis joined the Indian Medical Service in 1936 as a lieutenant, becoming a captain in 1937. His interest in psychiatry led to his appointment as psychiatric specialist for the Northern Command from 1938 to 1942.

During World War II, Davis served in the British Indian Army and rose to the rank of lieutenant colonel. He commanded the 80th Indian Field Ambulance (Parachute) and led an evacuation of injured soldiers through the jungles of Nagaland under enemy fire. For his courage, he was awarded the Distinguished Service Order in 1944.

=== European Mental Hospital ===
In 1946, Davis became the superintendent of the European Mental Hospital in Ranchi. Post-independence, he facilitated the renaming of the hospital to the Interprovincial Mental Hospital and opened it to Indian patients. He reorganized the hospital, increasing its capacity to 600 beds, and later, it was renamed the Central Institute of Psychiatry. During his time at the hospital, the renowned Bengali poet Kazi Nazrul Islam was briefly treated before being sent to Europe for further care. Davis introduced several firsts in Indian psychiatry:

- The use of electroencephalography in 1948.
- The introduction of psychosurgery in Ranchi, collaborating with military surgeons in the absence of a neurosurgeon.
- Early trials of new psychiatric treatments such as electroconvulsive therapy and insulin coma therapy.

He conducted research on cultural and epidemiological differences in psychiatric disorders among Indian patients. From 1947 to 1950, Davis traveled to London periodically, earning a Diploma in Psychological Medicine in 1950 while working part-time at the Maudsley Hospital and Institute of Neurology, London.

=== Kishore Nursing Home ===
In 1955, Davis left Central Institute of Psychiatry and, along with his wife Aleyamma Eapen, established the Kishore Nursing Home, later renamed the Davis Institute of Neuropsychiatry, in Ranchi. The nursing home was named after his friend, Maharaj Kumar Raj Kishore Shahdeo. Aleyamma, a trained psychiatric nurse, had been the matron of the European Mental Hospital and the first Indian nurse sent to London for psychiatric training. Together, they built one of India’s leading private psychiatric hospitals.

=== Contributions to psychiatry ===
Davis co-founded the Indian Psychiatric Society in 1947, serving as its first Secretary until 1953 and as President in 1954. He also contributed to drafting the Mental Health Act, 1987. Davis was a Fellow of the Royal College of Psychiatrists, UK, and represented India at international conferences, including the World Congresses of Psychiatry in Paris (1950) and Montreal (1961). Davis became an Indian citizen in 1948. In recognition of his contributions to psychiatry and mental health, he was awarded the Padma Shri by the Government of India in 1966.

== Death ==
Robert Brocklesby Davis died on 7 October 1980 in Charlottesville, in the United States, after a sudden coronary thrombosis while visiting his sister. To honor his legacy, the R.B. Davis Oration was established by the Indian Psychiatric Society – Eastern Zonal Branch. This oration is delivered annually at the society's conference.
