= Charles Pawsey =

British colonial administrator

Sir Charles Pawsey CSI CIE MC*
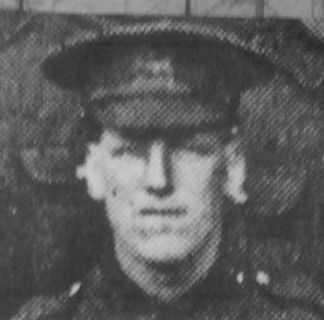
- Corporal Charles Pawsey during World War I
- Born: 14 July 1894; Surbiton, Surrey, England
- Died: 21 July 1972 (aged 78)
- Spouse: Rita Halliday (m. 1954)
- Military career
- Allegiance: United Kingdom
- Branch: British Army; Territorial Army; Indian Civil Service
- Rank: Captain
- Units: Worcestershire Regiment
- Conflicts: World War I World War II
- Awards: Military Cross; Medal bar

Sir Charles Ridley Pawsey CSI CIE MC* (14 July 1894 – 21 July 1972) was a British colonial administrator.

== Biography ==
Pawsey was born in Surbiton, Surrey, the second son of Charles James Pawsey and Ellen Edith Pawsey. His father was Paymaster In Chief of the Royal Navy. He was educated at Berkhamsted School and Wadham College, Oxford, where he graduated with a BA. He was commissioned into the Worcestershire Regiment in 1914 and won the Military Cross as a second lieutenant (temporary Lieutenant) in 1916 and bar as a second lieutenant (temporary captain) the next year. He was promoted captain in 1917 and relinquished his Territorial Army commission on 30 September 1921.

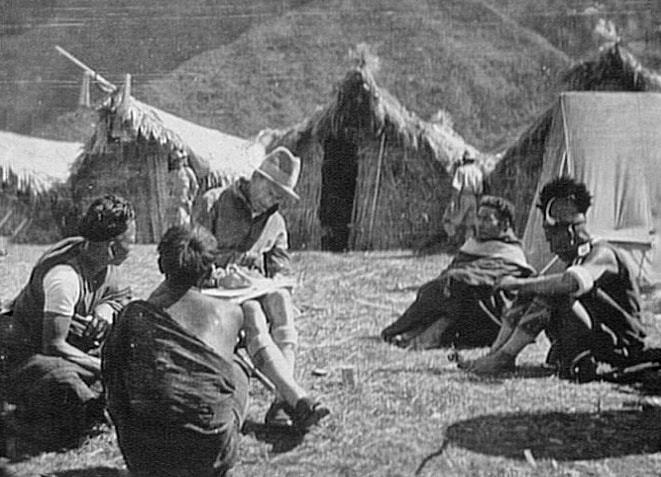
Charles Pawsey in the Naga Hills (1937) before the Burma Campaigns.

Pawsey joined the Indian Civil Service in 1919. He was appointed Assistant Commissioner in Assam in 1919, becoming Director of Land Records in 1932. He was made a Deputy Commissioner in 1935 and was District Commissioner, Naga Hills during the Burma campaigns of 1942 to 1944. Pawsey's bungalow and tennis court were the place where the British Fourteenth Army finally turned the tide of the war against the Japanese during the Burma Campaign of World War II at the Battle of Kohima. The part of this battle centred on his bungalow was known as the Battle of the Tennis Court. Showing great bravery and loyalty to the local Naga people, Pawsey refused to leave Kohima during the siege by the Japanese that lasted from 5 to 20 April 1944, and did what he could to bolster morale and support Colonel Richards the garrison commander. The Nagas remained completely loyal to him and by way of thanks their tribal leaders were introduced to Lord Mountbatten at Kohima in August 1944.

Prior to his return to Britain following India's independence, Pawsey wrote in the Naga Nation, underlining that autonomy within the Indian Union was the more prudent course to follow. For, "Independence will mean: tribal warfare, no hospitals, no schools, no salt, no trade with the plains and general unhappiness". He was knighted on 14 August 1947, (part of the 1948 New Year Honours) and he retired 1948. In his later years, he lived at The Priory, Badingham, Woodbridge, Suffolk, until his death on 21 July 1972.

== Family ==
In April 1953 when he was about 60 years old, Pawsey married Alejandra Georgiana Darrell Adamson, the widow of Hugh Ingle Halliday.

== See also ==
- Naga people
