= Battle of Shangshak =

1944 battle in Manipur, India

- Part of the Battle of Imphal, Operation U-Go during the Burma campaign of World War II
Date	20–26 March 1944
Location	8 miles (13 km) south of Ukhrul, Manipur, India
Result	See Aftermath

Belligerents
British India; Nepal	Japan

Commanders and leaders
Tim Hope-Thomson	Shigesaburō Miyazaki

Strength
Approx. 1 understrength parachute brigade, elements of two infantry battalions, one mtn bty	Approx. 1+ infantry regiment, elements of two regiments

Casualties and losses
652	400+

The Battle of Shangshak took place in Manipur in the forested and mountainous frontier area between India and Burma, from 20 March to 26 March 1944. The Japanese drove a parachute brigade (fighting as infantry) of the British Indian Army from its positions with heavy casualties, but suffered heavy casualties themselves. The delay imposed on the Japanese by the battle allowed British and Indian reinforcements to reach the vital position at Kohima before the Japanese.

== Background ==
In March 1944, the Japanese launched Operation U-Go, a major invasion of India. Two divisions of the Japanese Fifteenth Army – the 15th and 33rd – attacked IV Indian Corps at Imphal, the Japanese 31st Division advanced on Kohima, to cut the main road on which the troops at Imphal depended for supply from Dimapur.

The Japanese 31st division, divided into Left, Centre and Right Assault forces, advanced over a wide front. The Left Assault Force consisted of the regimental headquarters and two battalions of the Japanese 58th Regiment, and detachments from the division's supporting arms units. The regiment's commander was Colonel Utata Fukunaga, but the force was accompanied by the division's Infantry Group commander, Major General Shigesaburō Miyazaki, who was the senior officer. On 18 March, the force was approaching the village of Ukhrul, about 25 miles (40 km) north-east of Imphal and 8 miles (13 km) north of Sangshak.

== British dispositions ==
Early in 1944, the 49th Indian Infantry Brigade of the 23rd Indian Infantry Division had been stationed at Sangshak, tasked with defending against a Japanese advance from the Chindwin River towards Ukhrul. As the Japanese offensive began, the Japanese surrounded the 17th Indian Infantry Division at Tiddim, south of Imphal. Lieutenant General Geoffry Scoones, the commander of IV Corps, was forced to send the 23rd Division (including the 49th Brigade) to help the 17th Division break out of encirclement. Subsequently, the 50th Indian Parachute Brigade was ordered to move to the Sangshak area, to take over the position vacated by the departure of the 49th Brigade.

At the time, two battalions of the 50th Indian Parachute Brigade had been conducting advanced jungle training in the Kohima area, while the third battalion completed its parachute training in India. The brigade consisted of 152 (Indian) and 153 (Gurkha) Parachute Battalions, with a machine gun company, a mountain artillery battery and other supporting arms. Its commander was Brigadier Maxwell Hope-Thomson. Even before the Japanese attack opened, they had received preliminary orders to move to Sangshak. Because of shortage of transport, they required four days (from 14 March to 18 March) to complete the movement. They took under command the 4th Battalion, 5th Mahratta Light Infantry, which had been part of the 49th Brigade, and two companies of the Nepalese Kalibahadur Regiment consisting of 200 men.

Upon arrival, the brigade found that the area they had been assigned had not been prepared by the 49th, and there was no barbed wire to construct field obstacles. Repeated requests were made for defensive stores by the 50th Brigade, but the demands were not met before the battle began.

== Battle ==
=== Preliminaries ===
The 50th Brigade initially deployed over a large area, with outposts 8 miles (13 km) east of Sangshak and the machine-gun company in Ukhrul. On 19 March, the Japanese overran an isolated company (C Company of the 152 Parachute Battalion) deployed on a hill known as Point 7378. The company was reduced to 20 men. Urged by his second-in-command (Colonel Abbott) that the brigade risked defeat in detail if it remained strung out as isolated posts, Hope-Thomson ordered his forces to concentrate. Most of the force initially concentrated at Sheldon's Corner, 8 miles (13 km) east of Sangshak on 21 March, but that afternoon, Hope-Thomson pulled them back, first to "Kidney Camp" 4 miles (6.4 km) to the west, and then to Sangshak itself, where they took up a defensive position on a hill just east of the village, with an American missionary church at its north end. The position measured only 800 yards (730 m) by 400 yards (370 m), and had no fresh water. Hard rock was found only 3 feet (0.91 m) below the soil, so only shallow trenches could be dug.

The II Battalion of the Japanese 58th Infantry Regiment had meanwhile captured Ukhrul from 50th Brigade's machine-gun company. Major General Miyazaki was present with the battalion. He was aware that there was a British brigade at Sangshak. Although Sangshak was in the sector assigned to 31st Division's neighbouring formation, the Japanese 15th Division, Miyazaki knew that this formation was lagging behind his force. He therefore decided to clear the British from Sangshak to prevent them interfering with his advance.

=== Fighting at Sangshak ===
The Japanese battalion attacked Sangshak from the north on the night of 22 March. Miyazaki was prepared to wait for his regimental guns and some attached mountain guns to arrive to support the attack, but the battalion commander (Captain Nagaya) attacked hastily without artillery support. The British had a total of 46 mountain guns and 3-inch mortars with which to provide indirect fire support, and despite initial gains, the assaulting Japanese force suffered heavily from British artillery and mortar fire.

One of the Japanese officers killed in the 50th Parachute Brigade's positions was found to be carrying vital maps and documents, which contained all of 31st Division's plans. Brigadier Hope-Thomson sent two copies of the documents through the encircling Japanese to IV Corps HQ in Imphal. These were to be vital to IV Corps' and Fourteenth Army's response to the Japanese attack on Kohima.

The next day (23 March), Allied aircraft tried to drop supplies to the 50th Parachute Brigade, but the brigade's position was so small that many of the supplies went to the Japanese. The Gurkhas of 152 Parachute Battalion attacked to recover them, supported by fighters which had escorted the transport aircraft. They were beaten back, but the Japanese also suffered heavy casualties. Japanese artillery was moved into position using elephants, and began firing on Sangshak on 23 March.

On 24 March, the Japanese were reinforced by the III Battalion of the 58th Regiment, accompanied by the regimental commander and Miyazaki. They attacked immediately, but they too were repulsed.

The III Battalion of the Japanese 60th Regiment, belonging to Masafumi Yamauchi's 15th Division, also began attacking the defended position from the east on 25 March, supported by artillery fire from two mountain guns from the 21st Field Artillery Regiment. Their commander (Major Fukushima) insisted that his officers properly reconnoitre the objective and plan their approach in contrast to the 58th Regiment's hasty tactics. However, his infantry became lost trying to approach the position at night. During the following day, their two attached mountain guns destroyed many of the defenders' shallow trenches. On 26 March, Fukushima's infantry of the 60th Regiment again became lost trying to attack at night and were caught in the open at dawn.

The Japanese planned a last all-out assault on 27 March (although Miyazaki tried to insist that 58th Regiment alone should attack, so that they would have the sole honour of the victory), but ultimately this effort was unnecessary. By that date, the defenders were exhausted and desperately short of water. There were 300 wounded in the position, and the smell of decomposing bodies (including those of the mules belonging to the attached mountain artillery, and supply column) was unbearable. At 6:00 pm on 26 March, Hope-Thomson received orders to withdraw. His brigade moved out under cover of darkness at 10.30 pm, with the 4th/5th Mahrattas providing a rearguard. About 100 wounded were left behind, although many others were carried out. About 100 other men were captured by another battalion of the Japanese 60th Regiment (the "Uchibori battalion"). The Japanese subsequently occupied the position after a patrol confirmed that it had been abandoned.

== Aftermath ==
The 50th Indian Parachute Brigade had suffered 652 casualties. The Japanese reported capturing 100 prisoners, most of whom were wounded. The Japanese also captured plenty of air-dropped supplies which had missed the defenders at Sangshak, and other equipment including heavy weapons, vehicles and radios. Many of the Indian troops that were taken prisoner were later released – albeit having been stripped of their equipment and clothes – by the Japanese after they were forced to withdraw and were no longer able to spare troops to guard them.

Japanese casualties were also heavy. The II Battalion, 58th Regiment was the hardest-hit unit, with more than 400 casualties. However, the prolonged battle had also delayed Miyazaki's advance on Kohima by a week, and heavily depleted the 58th Regiment which would lead the attack. It also delayed some of the 15th Division in their advance on Imphal. Miyazaki's Left Assault Force had the shortest and easiest route to Kohima. They arrived at the vital Kohima ridge only on April 3, by which time Allied reinforcements had also reached the area. In the ensuing Battle of Kohima, the Japanese failed to capture the entire ridge, and were eventually forced to retreat by British counter-attacks and shortage of food and ammunition.

=== Awards for valour ===
Lt. Col. Dr. Robert Brocklesby Davis, commander of the 80th Field Ambulance (Parachute), was awarded the Distinguished Service Order (DSO) for his actions in this battle.

Lt. Alan Cowell, Platoon commander, 152 Battalion, was awarded the Military Cross (MC) for his actions in the defence of the Church position on 24 March 1944.

== Sources ==
- Allison, David, Fight Your Way Out: The Siege of Sangshak, India/ Burma Border 1944, Pen & Sword, ISBN 978-1-39905-631-1
- Allen, Louis, Burma: The Longest War 1941–45, J.M. Dent & Sons Ltd, 1984, ISBN 0-460-02474-4
- Katoch, Hemant Singh, Imphal 1944: The Japanese Invasion of India, Bloomsbury, 2018, ISBN 978-1-47282-016-7
- Rooney, David, Burma Victory: Imphal and Kohima March 1944 to May 1945, Cassell, 1992, ISBN 0-304-35457-0
- Seaman, Harry, The Battle At Sangshak: Prelude to Kohima, Pen and Sword, 1989, ISBN 978-1-47381-214-7
- Singh, Suresh, The Endless Kabaw Valley: British Created Vicious Cycle of Manipur, Burma and India, Quills Ink Publishing, 2014, ISBN 978-9-38431-800-0
