= 161st Indian Infantry Brigade =

161st Indian Infantry Brigade 161st Infantry Brigade (Indian Army)
- Active: 1941–1948 and onwards
- Country: British India; India
- Allegiance: British Empire; Indian Army
- Branch: British Indian Army; Indian Army
- Type: Infantry
- Size: Brigade
- Engagements: Western Desert Campaign; Burma Campaign; Battle of Kohima

Commanders
- Notable commanders: Brigadier William Donovan Stamer CB CBE DSO MC; Brigadier Harry Grimshaw CB CBE DSO

The 161st Indian Infantry Brigade was an infantry brigade formation of the Indian Army during World War II. As part of the arrangements for the independence and partition of British India the brigade was allocated to India and became the 161st Infantry Brigade in the army of the newly independent India.

== History ==
The brigade was formed in late November 1941 from the reformed British 161st Infantry Brigade which had been assigned to the 5th Indian Infantry Division earlier in the month. The brigade was then sent to garrison Cyprus in case of a German invasion. In April 1942, it moved to Egypt to take part in the Western Desert Campaign having been re organised as a motor brigade. Attached to the British 10th Armoured Division for the First Battle of El Alamein between June and July 1942, the brigade returned to the 5th Division for action in Burma. In Burma it was attached successively to a number of divisions: British 2nd Infantry Division between April and May 1944, then 7th Indian Infantry Division between May and June 1944, during the Battle of Kohima, following which it returned to the 5th Division. In March 1945 there was a further brief attachment to 7th Division returning once more at the end of that month to the 5th Division until the end of the war. The brigade ended the war at sea as part of the force assembled to invade Malaya. At the end of the war the brigade formed part of the force sent to the Dutch East Indies to restore order for the colonial government facing hostile opposition from the local independence movement. The brigade returned to India in 1946.

== Post independence succession ==
After India's independence the brigade, under the arrangements of the partition of British India, was allocated to India and became part of the Indian Army, dropping the epithet "Indian" to be 161st Infantry brigade and moving to Ranchi with the 5th Infantry Division. Elements of 5th Infantry Division, including 161st Infantry Brigade, were called to Punjab to help curb the violence being inflicted on refugees during partition. The brigade was urgently airlifted in an ad hoc manner to Srinagar in Jammu and Kashmir to halt the tribal invasion during the Indo-Pakistani War of 1947. The brigade successfully prevented the fall of Srinagar, fought the battles of Badgam and Shalateng, reinforced Poonch garrison, distinguished itself in recapture of Uri and the successful ejection of tribals from the Jhelum valley.

== Formation during the Second World War ==
- 3rd Battalion, 7th Rajput Regiment November 1941 to July 1942
- 4th Battalion, 7th Rajput Regiment November 1941 to August 1945
- 1/4th Battalion, Essex Regiment November 1941 to March 1942
- 1st Battalion, 2nd Punjab Regiment April to July 1942
- 1st Battalion, 1st Punjab Regiment April 1942 to August 1945
- 1st Battalion, Argyll and Sutherland Highlanders August to November 1942
- 4th Battalion, Queen's Own Royal West Kent Regiment December 1942 to June 1945
- 28th Field Regiment, Royal Artillery May to June 1943
- 25th Dragoons January to February 1944
- 2nd Battalion, Suffolk Regiment February to March 1944
- 1st Battalion, Burma Regiment March to April 1944
- 3rd Battalion, 4th Gurkha Rifles June to August 1945
- No 2 Field Company, Bengal Sappers, July 1942 to August 1945.

== See also ==
- List of Indian Army Brigades in World War II
