= Robert Lyman =

British military historian (born 1963)

Robert Lyman MBE FRHistS
- Born: 13 January 1963 (age 63); New Zealand
- Education: Scotch College Melbourne, University of York (BA), King's College London (MA), University of Wales (MA), Cranfield University (BA), University of East Anglia (PhD)
- Alma mater: Royal Military Academy Sandhurst
- Occupation: Military historian
- Writing career
- Language: English
- Subject: Modern history
- Website: www.robertlyman.com

Robert Murray Lyman MBE FRHistS (born 13 June 1963) is a British military historian. He has published a number of popular books on the Second World War.

== Biography ==
=== Education ===
Born in New Zealand, Lyman was educated at Scotch College, Melbourne and joined the British Army at the age of 18. He was commissioned into the Light Infantry from the Royal Military Academy Sandhurst in 1982 and left the army as a Major.

=== Career ===
Following his career in the British Army, Lyman has published over 16 books on the Second World War in Europe, North Africa and Asia. He regularly appears on TV and radio and reviews books for newspapers and magazines. His presentation of the case for Field Marshal Sir William Slim won a National Army Museum debate in 2011 for Britain's Greatest General and his case for Kohima/Imphal won a National Army Museum debate in 2012 for Britain's Greatest Battle. Lyman regularly gives lectures at organisations such as the National Army Museum, and he is also a battlefield guide.

Lyman has been a trustee of the Kohima Educational Trust since 2004, and chairman between 2008 and 2016.

He is a fellow of the Royal Historical Society.

Lyman was appointed Member of the Order of the British Empire (MBE) in the 2024 New Year Honours for services to military history and charity work in Nagaland.

== Published works ==
| Book | Year | Published | Other |
|---|---|---|---|
| Slim, Master of War | 2004 | Constable & Robinson | ISBN 9781845292263 |
| First Victory: Britain's Forgotten Struggle in the Middle East, 1941 | 2006 | Constable & Robinson | ISBN 9781845291082 |
| Iraq 1941: The Battles for Basra, Habbaniya, Fallujah and Baghdad | 2006 | Osprey | ISBN 9781841769912 |
| The Generals: From Defeat to Victory, Leadership in Asia, 1941-45 | 2008 | Constable & Robinson | ISBN 9781845294915 |
| The Longest Siege: Tobruk, the Battle that Saved North Africa | 2009 | Macmillan | ISBN 9780230710245 |
| Kohima 1944: The Battle That Saved India | 2010 | Osprey | ISBN 9781846039393 |
| Japan's Last Bid for Victory: The Invasion of India 1944 | 2011 | Praetorian | ISBN 9781848845428 |
| Bill Slim | 2011 | Osprey | ISBN 9781849085281 |
| Operation Suicide: The Remarkable Story of the Cockleshell Raid | 2012 | Quercus | ISBN 9780857382405 Translated into French |
| Into the Jaws of Death: The True Story of the Legendary Raid on Saint-Nazaire | 2013 | Quercus | ISBN 9781471239809 |
| Jail Busters: The Secret Story of MI6, the French Resistance and Operation Jericho | 2014 | Quercus | ISBN 9781471275029 |
| The Real X-Men: The Heroic Story of the Underwater War 1942-1945 | 2015 | Quercus | ISBN 9781784294748 |
| Among the Headhunters: An Extraordinary World War II Story of Survival in the Burmese Jungle | 2016 | Da Capo | ISBN 9780306824678 |
| The Rise of the Third Reich: The Takeover of the Continent in the Words of Observers | 2018 | Amberley | ISBN 9781445687261 |
| Under a Darkening Sky: The American Experience in Nazi Europe, 1939-1941 | 2018 | Pegasus | ISBN 9781681777368 |
| A War of Empires: Japan, India, Burma & Britain 1941-45 | 2021 | Osprey | ISBN 1472847148 |
| Operation Jericho: Freeing the French Resistance from Gestapo jail, Amiens 1944 | 2022 | Osprey | ISBN 1472852060 |
| Victory to Defeat: The British Army 1918-40 | 2023 | Osprey | ISBN 1472860861 |
| Korea: War Without End | 2025 | Osprey | ISBN 9781472869753 |

=== Other contributions ===
- Wrote a chapter in Professor Gary Sheffield's book The Challenges of High Command (Palgrave Macmillan, 2003).
- Wrote the foreword to David Rooney's Stilwell, The Patriot.
- Contributed to General Sir Richard Dannatt's biography Leading from the Front.
- Contributed to Jeffrey Archer's second volume of the Clifton Chronicles, The Sins of the Father.

== Broadcasts ==
- Historian on Who Do You Think You Are documentaries for Alan Cumming and Nicky Campbell.
- He was the historical consultant to the BBC for the VJ Day ceremonies in 2015 and 2020.
- He contributed to the documentary series Narrow Escapes of WW2.
- In October 2024 he was interviewed by Konstantin Kisin and Francis Foster on Triggernometry podcast, with regards to the Pacific in World War 2.
