= Kōtoku Satō =

Japanese general (1893–1959)

- 佐藤 幸徳
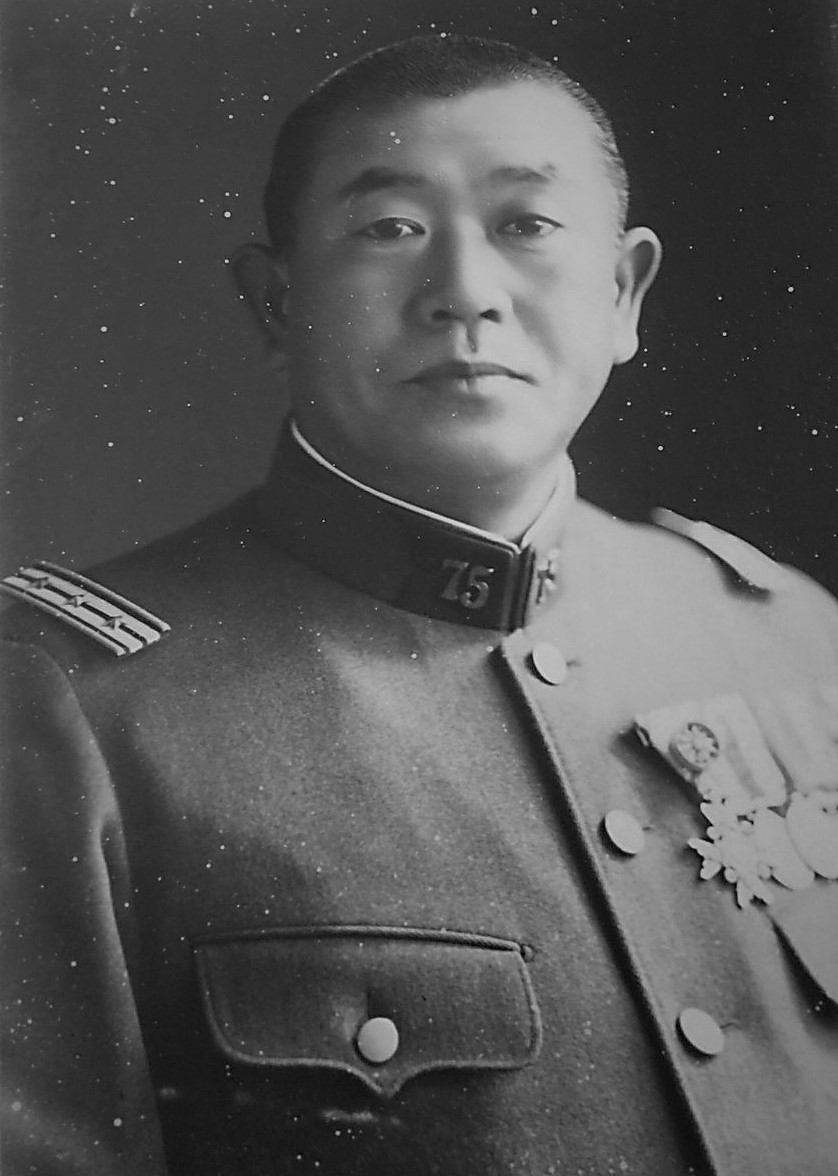
- Satō in 1937
- Born: March 5, 1893; Yamagata Prefecture, Japan
- Died: February 26, 1959 (aged 65)
- Education: Imperial Japanese Army Academy
- Military career
- Allegiance: Japan
- Branch: Imperial Japanese Army
- Service years: 1913–1945
- Rank: Lieutenant General
- Commands: 31st Division
- Conflicts: February 26 Incident; Soviet–Japanese Border Wars; Battle of Lake Khasan; World War II; Burma campaign

Kōtoku Satō (佐藤 幸徳, Satō Kōtoku; March 5, 1893 – February 26, 1959) was a lieutenant general in the Imperial Japanese Army in World War II.

== Biography ==
=== Early career ===
Satō was born in Yamagata prefecture and attended military preparatory school in Sendai. He graduated from the Imperial Japanese Army Academy in 1913 and the Army Staff College in 1921, and was assigned to administrative duties within the Imperial Japanese Army General Staff. He spent two years as the head of the War History Bureau, during which time he came into contact with many important members of the Tōseiha political faction within the Army, including Kuniaki Koiso and Hideki Tōjō, and was involved in the creation of the Sakurakai organization with Kingoro Hashimoto. Also during this period, he had serious conflicts with the head of the General Affairs section of the General Staff, Renya Mutaguchi, who also happened to be a staunch supporter of the rival Kōdōha faction. Satō was promoted to lieutenant colonel in December 1932 and assigned to the IJA 11th Infantry Regiment. From August 1934, he was assigned to the staff of the IJA 6th Division. During the February 26 incident, IJA 6th Division played a role in the suppression of the pro-Kōdōha attempted coup-d'etat.

=== Soviet-Japanese border conflict ===
Satō was promoted to colonel in October 1937 and assigned command of the Manchukuo-based IJA 75th Infantry Regiment. His regiment was at the Battle of Lake Khasan, refusing to budge from its positions even after sustaining over 50% casualties, and then ousted the Soviet forces from a disputed hill in a night assault which the Japanese considered to be a model of its tactical type. Satō later boasted that since he was not in favor with Tōjō, his unit had been given the worst position on the front lines, and he looked forward to being given the worst position again at the next battle. From December 1938 he was commander of the 2nd Sector, 8th Border Garrison, which was at the Nomonhan Incident. In August 1939 he was promoted to major general and was assigned to command the IJA 23rd Infantry Brigade, in Hailar, Manchukuo.

=== The Burma campaign ===
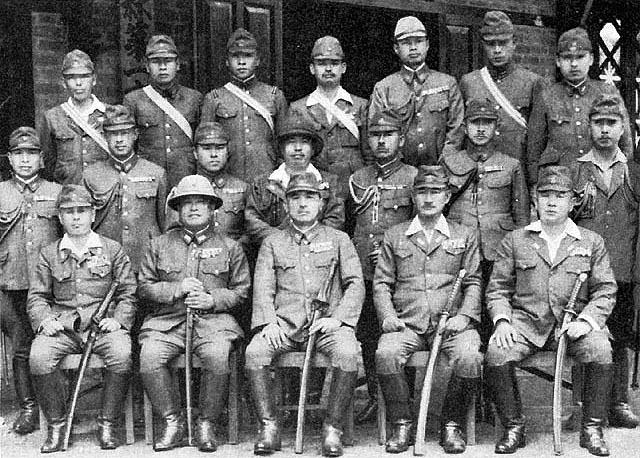
Group photo of the command staff of the Fifteenth Army, Satō on the right of the front row, and Mutaguchi in the center (May 1943)

In March 1941, Satō was attached to the staff of the IJA 54th Division and in October 1941 became commander of the IJA 67th Independent Brigade. He was promoted to lieutenant general in December 1942. From March 1943, he was assigned command of the IJA 31st Division from the time of its activation in China. Assigned to construction operations in Thailand, the division was ordered to Burma to join the Fifteenth Army in September, 1943. The Japanese plan to invade India, codenamed U-Go, was originally intended as a spoiling attack against the IV Corps at Imphal, to disrupt the Allied offensive plans for that year. The commander of the Fifteenth Army was none other than his old nemesis Lieutenant General Renya Mutaguchi. Despite the objections of his staff, Mutaguchi enlarged the plan to include an invasion of India itself and perhaps even overthrow the British Raj. Despite reports to Tokyo from his subordinates on the infeasibility of the plan, the objections were eventually overruled by Army Minister Hideki Tōjō.

Part of the plan involved sending the 31st Division (which was composed of 58th, 124th, and 138th Regiments, and the 31st Mountain Artillery Regiment) to capture Kohima and thus cut off Imphal, and then destroy the rail yard at Dimapur. Divisional commander Satō was unhappy with his role. He had not been involved in the planning of the offensive and seriously doubted the Japanese chances for success; he had already told his staff that they might all starve to death, as Mutaguchi made no provision for logistics or resupply.

In common with many senior Japanese officers, Satō considered Mutaguchi to be a "blockhead", although General William Slim considered Satō himself to be

...the most unenterprising of all the Japanese generals I encountered. He had been ordered to take Kohima and dig in. His bullet head was filled with one idea only – to take Kohima. It never struck him that he could inflict terrible damage on us without taking Kohima at all. Leaving a small force to contain it, and moving by tracks to the east of Warren's brigade at Nichugard, he could, by 5 April, have struck the railway with the bulk of his division. But he had no vision, so, as his troops came up, he flung them into attack after attack on the little town of Kohima.

— William Slim, Defeat into Victory

By the middle of May, Satō's troops were starving as had been predicted. He considered that Mutaguchi and the HQ of Japanese Fifteenth Army were taking little notice of his situation, as they had issued several confusing and contradictory orders to him during April. Because the main attack on Imphal faltered around the middle of April, Mutaguchi ordered 31st Division or parts of it to join in the attack on Imphal from the north, even while the division was struggling to capture and hold Kohima. Satō considered that his division was being "messed around" without proper planning or consideration for the conditions. Nor did Satō believe that Fifteenth Army headquarters were exerting themselves to move supplies to his division. He began pulling his troops back to conserve their strength, thus allowing the British to secure Kohima Ridge.

On 25 May, Satō notified Fifteenth Army HQ that he would withdraw on 1 June unless his division received supplies. Finally on 31 May, he abandoned positions north of the road, in spite of orders from Mutaguchi to hold his positions. (For a divisional commander to retreat without orders or permission from his superior was unheard-of in the Japanese Army.) After ignoring army orders for several weeks, Satō was removed from command of 31st Division on 7 July 1944.

Satō refused an invitation by Mutaguchi to commit seppuku and demanded a court martial to clear his name and publicly expose Mutaguchi's incompetence. At the prompting of Lieutenant General Masakazu Kawabe, commander of Burma Area Army, doctors declared that he had suffered a mental breakdown and was unfit to stand trial on 23 November 1944.

He was ordered to retire, but was recalled to active duty immediately and assigned to the staff of the Sixteenth Army, which was a garrison force in Java. In May 1945, he was attached to the staff of the Sendai-based Northeastern Area Army, which was assigned to defend the Tohoku region of Japan against possible Allied invasion.

=== Postwar ===
After the surrender of Japan, Satō was often vilified in the press as a coward and was accused of causing the Japanese defeat in Burma. For his part, Satō continued to insist until his death in 1959 that the actions he took were necessary to save the lives of his men, and that the charges of insanity made against him for withdrawing from the battle were unjustified. Satō devoted his efforts to assisting surviving members of his former command, and he created a group of ex-army men who erected a monument to the fallen of the Imphal Campaign in Matsuyama, Ehime and in Shonai, Yamagata.
