= Montagu Stopford =

British Army general (1892–1971)

General Sir Montagu Stopford GCB KBE DSO MC DL
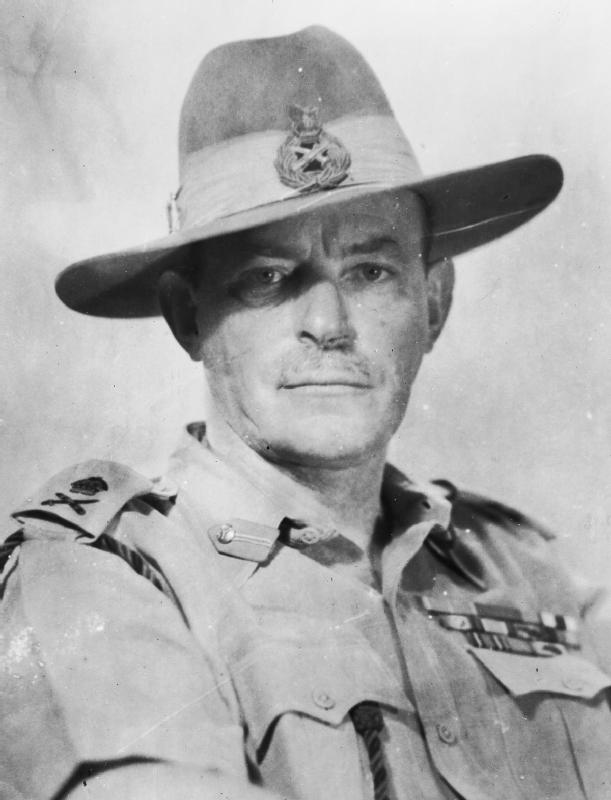
- Born: 16 November 1892; Hanover Square, London, England
- Died: 10 March 1971 (aged 78); Chipping Norton, Oxfordshire, England
- Burial place: Heythrop, Oxfordshire, England
- Relatives: Sir Lionel Stopford (father)
- Military career
- Allegiance: United Kingdom
- Branch: British Army
- Service years: 1911–1949
- Rank: General
- Nickname: "Monty"
- Service number: 4554
- Unit: Rifle Brigade (The Prince Consort's Own)
- Commands: Northern Command (1947–1949); South East Asia Command (1946); Twelfth Army (1945); XXXIII Indian Corps (1943–1945); XII Corps (1942–1943); Staff College, Camberley (1941–1942); 56th (London) Infantry Division (1941); 17th Infantry Brigade (1939–1941); 53rd Battalion, Rifle Brigade (The Prince Consort's Own) (c. 1919–1920)
- Conflicts: First World War; Second World War
- Awards: Knight Grand Cross of the Order of the Bath; Knight Commander of the Order of the British Empire; Companion of the Distinguished Service Order; Military Cross; Mentioned in Despatches (3)

General Sir Montagu George North Stopford, GCB, KBE, DSO, MC, DL (16 November 1892 – 10 March 1971) was a senior British Army officer who fought during both the First and Second World Wars. The latter he served in with distinction, commanding XXXIII Indian Corps in the Far East, where he served under General Sir William Slim, and played a significant role in the Burma Campaign, specifically during the Battle of Kohima in mid-1944.

== Early life and First World War ==
Born on 16 November 1892 in Hanover Square, London, Montagu Stopford was the son of Colonel Sir Lionel Stopford, and the great-grandson of James Stopford, 3rd Earl of Courtown. His mother was Mabel Georgina Emily, daughter of George Alexander Mackenzie. He was educated at Wellington College, Berkshire and the Royal Military College, Sandhurst. He was commissioned as a second lieutenant into the Rifle Brigade (The Prince Consort's Own) on 20 September 1911, His fellow graduates included Edward Williams, also of the Rifle Brigade, John Fullerton Evetts, Leslie Gordon Phillips, Eric Paytherus Nares, and Kenneth Anderson, all of whom would, like Stopford himself, become general officers. He was posted to the 2nd Battalion of the regiment, then serving in Rawalpindi, India, until shortly after the outbreak of the First World War in August 1914.

In late October Stopford, by now a lieutenant, arrived with his battalion in Liverpool, having left India the month before. The battalion, now serving as part of the 25th Brigade of the 8th Division, arrived on the Western Front in early November. After serving with his battalion throughout some of the most intense battles of 1915, including the Battle of Neuve Chapelle, Stopford, promoted on 5 July 1915 to captain, became a General Staff Officer Grade 3 (GSO3) with the 56th (1st London) Division, a Territorial Force (TF) formation, on 10 June 1916. On 6 December 1916 he became the brigade major of the 56th Division's 167th (1st London) Brigade, a post which he held throughout 1917 until 25 March 1918. He ended the war with the substantive rank of major, and had been twice mentioned in despatches and awarded the Military Cross.

== Between the wars ==
Remaining in the army during the difficult interwar period, spent mainly on regimental duties, Stopford served in the British Army of the Rhine (BAOR), as Commanding Officer (CO) of the 53rd Battalion, Rifle Brigade. He then returned to England, where he attended the Staff College, Camberley, from 1923 to 1924. His fellow students there included Gordon Macready, Dudley Johnson, Douglas Pratt, John Smyth, Roderic Petre, Arthur Percival, Frederick Pile, Henry Verschoyle-Campbell, Robert Stone, John Halsted, Balfour Hutchison, Colville Wemyss, Rowley Hill, Kenneth Loch, Michael Gambier-Parry, Alastair MacDougall, Arthur Wakely, Edmond Schreiber, Robert Pargiter and Sydney Muspratt, along with Horace Robertson of the Australian Army, and Harry Crerar and Georges Vanier of the Canadian Army. Nearly all of these men were, like Stopford himself, destined to become general officers in the near future. In February 1926 Stopford became a General Staff Officer at the Small Arms School at Hythe, Kent. On 1 July 1929 he was promoted to brevet rank of major.

In February 1930 Stopford relinquished his assignment as brigade major with the 11th Infantry Brigade. In May 1932 he was made a GSO2 to the Inspector General of the King's African Rifles. Promoted to permanent major in January 1933, he was a brevet lieutenant colonel two years later. In January 1938, towards the end of the interwar period, Stopford returned to the Staff College, Camberley, this time with the role of Senior Instructor, and was promoted to colonel on 25 July (with seniority backdating to 12 January). In this position he came into contact with numerous other members of the Directing Staff who were to achieve high rank in the war which was believed to be inevitable. They were John Swayne, Brian Horrocks, Alexander Galloway, Charles Allfrey, Francis Festing, Charles Keightley, Charles Loewen and Cameron Nicholson, along with the Commandant, Major General Sir Ronald Adam.

== Second World War ==
=== France and Belgium ===
Stopford was still there by the outbreak of the Second World War in September 1939. However, just over a month later he was selected to command the 17th Infantry Brigade, then being formed in Aldershot, Hampshire for service overseas, and was promoted to the temporary rank of brigadier. Comprising three Regular Army battalions formerly scattered around the United Kingdom, the brigade was serving under Aldershot Command until being sent to France, arriving there on 19 October, as part of the British Expeditionary Force (BEF). There the brigade served briefly under General Headquarters (GHQ) BEF before passing to the control of II Corps, whose General Officer Commanding (GOC), Lieutenant General Sir Alan Brooke, had been one of Stopford's instructors at the Staff College, Camberley in the 1920s and thought highly of his capabilities. In December the brigade was transferred again, to the 4th Division under Major General Dudley Johnson (who had been one of Stopford's fellow students at the Staff College), before, towards the end of the month, coming under the command of Major General Harold Franklyn's 5th Division. In addition to Stopford's 17th Brigade, the division had the 13th Brigade under Brigadier Miles Dempsey and the 15th Brigade under Brigadier Horatio Berney-Ficklin, and supporting divisional troops.

The next few months were spent in relative quiet, the brigade either training or helping in the construction of defensive positions in expectation of a repeat of the trench warfare that had characterised so much of the First World War. By 9 May 1940, the day before the German Army attacked in the West, Stopford's brigade, along with the rest of the 5th Division, was held in GHQ Reserve, the War Office's view being that it should return to the United Kingdom as a reserve. However, by 16 May the division (excluding the 15th Brigade, which had been removed for participation in operations in Norway) was on the River Senne, where it first encountered the Germans, but was soon ordered to disengage and withdraw to the River Escaut. On 19 May the division was ordered to Arras, where a gap was emerging. Major General Franklyn, GOC of the 5th Division, was ordered to take command of Major General Giffard Martel's 50th Division and the 1st Army Tank Brigade, in addition to his own division, which was to be known as "Frankforce". On 21 May "Frankforce" was ordered by General Lord Gort, Commander-in-Chief (C-in-C) of the BEF, to attack across the German line of advance. Stopford's 17th Brigade was held in reserve on Vimy Ridge for the operation, and, on 23 May, after Stopford himself noticed German infantry and tanks advancing on 17th Brigades' position. Although French support was promised it never materialised and the brigade, after heavy fighting, was ordered to retreat, withdrawing from their positions on the night of 23 May and the early hours of 24 May.

The 5th Division was then moved to the Ypres−Comines Canal, where another gap had been created on the BEF's left flank, due to the wholesale surrender of the Belgian Army. Stopford's brigade came under a succession of determined attacks from 26 to 28 May, suffering many losses but managing to retain its position. By the time the 17th Brigade fell back towards Dunkirk, from where it was evacuated to England on the night of 31 May/1 June, the brigade was reduced from a strength of over 2,500 officers and men, at the beginning of the campaign, to less than that of a battalion and Brigadier Dempsey's 13th Brigade was in a similarly depleted state.

=== Britain ===
A few weeks later Stopford, along with Dempsey, was appointed a Companion of the Distinguished Service Order (DSO) for his services in France and Belgium. Stopford remained with his brigade for the next seven months, in June moving to Scotland with the rest of the division, now reunited with all three brigades and commanded from mid-July by Major General Horatio Berney-Ficklin, formerly the 15th Brigade commander, after Major General Franklyn was promoted to command VIII Corps, to reform after its severe casualties. Most of the rest of 1940 was spent in Scottish Command and was devoted to training to repel a German invasion of Britain, then, in the aftermath of Dunkirk, thought to be imminent, although in Scotland it was considered less likely, yet still a distinct possibility. By late October, with the threat of invasion now much receded, the division moved to North West England.

By now recognised as a potential senior commander, and in common with a number of other relatively junior officers who had fought in France, in late January 1941 he handed over command of the 17th Brigade, which he had now commanded for almost sixteen months, to Brigadier G. W. B. Tarleton and was made GOC of the 56th (London) Infantry Division, in succession to Major General Claude Liardet, soon receiving a promotion to the acting major general. A first line Territorial Army (TA) formation, formerly the 1st London Division, the 56th Division − comprising the 167th, 168th and 169th Infantry Brigades and supporting divisional troops − was serving in Kent, the most vulnerable part of the country to invasion, as one of three divisions in XII Corps, then commanded by Lieutenant General Andrew Thorne until April when he was replaced by Lieutenant General Bernard Montgomery. The two other divisions in XII Corps were the 43rd (Wessex) and 44th (Home Counties) Divisions, commanded respectively by Major Generals Charles Allfrey (from late February) and Brian Horrocks (from late June), both of whom were known to Stopford, having been fellow instructors at the Staff College, Camberley before the war. Thanks to his predecessor, Major General Liardet, a TA officer who had been GOC for well over three years, the division, which had not seen action in France, was relatively well trained and reasonably well-equipped and, with the arrival of Montgomery as the new corps commander, large-scale exercises became common, getting progressively more difficult each week. Montgomery, already well known for his tendency to dismiss senior officers who failed to live up to his standards, appears to have formed a high opinion of Stopford, as the latter was not sacked, and may well have secured for him his next appointment, as Commandant of the Staff College, Camberley, handing over command of the 56th Division to Major General Eric Miles in early October.

Stopford took over as Commandant from Major General Robert Collins, who ironically had been one of his instructors there when he was attending as a student in the 1920s. The course at the Staff College, Camberley (and also the Staff College, Quetta in India for Indian Army officers) had, before the war, lasted almost two years and the intention was to teach the students to not only be excellent staff officers but, essentially, to prepare them to be the generals of the future. The outbreak of war, and the necessity to provide large numbers of competent and qualified staff officers in the quickest time possible, had resulted in the course being considerably reduced from nearly two years to five months, and the pre-war competitive entrance exam was abolished. Stopford, promoted to temporary major general in January 1942, was there for just over a year, where many important lessons were learnt from the fighting in North Africa, until, in November 1942 Stopford handed over to Major General Sir Alan Cunningham.

Stopford's next posting was to XII Corps, this time as its GOC, with a promotion to the acting rank of lieutenant general. Taking over from Lieutenant General James Gammell, who had briefly been a fellow brigade commander in the 5th Division shortly after Dunkirk, XII Corps was still serving in Kent, although the emphasis was now slowly changing from being on the defensive to taking the offensive. The corps, then comprising Major General William Ramsden's 3rd (replaced by Major General William Bradshaw's 59th Division in late March), Major General Ivor Thomas's 43rd (Wessex) and Major General Robert Ross's 53rd (Welsh) Infantry Divisions, along with several independent brigades, had been selected for participation in Operation Overlord, the Allied invasion of Normandy. Throughout 1943 the corps, aided by its Brigadier General Staff (BGS), Dudley Ward, participated in several large-scale exercises, most notably in Exercise SPARTAN in March. Made a temporary lieutenant general in early November, Stopford handed over XII Corps to Lieutenant General Neil Ritchie later in the month.

=== Burma and India ===
Stopford was sent to India to become GOC of XXXIII Indian Corps, in succession to Lieutenant General Philip Christison, who was posted to XV Corps as its GOC. Formed the previous year, the corps had so far not seen action against the Japanese, being initially held in reserve. Stopford's arrival coincided with a new role conceived for his corps, which then consisted of only the British 2nd Infantry Division (Major General John Grover). At the Cairo Conference, which was held shortly after Stopford's arrival in India, U.S. President Franklin D. Roosevelt promised Generalissimo Chiang Kai-shek of the Republic of China that the Allies would launch an amphibious operation across the Bay of Bengal. Roosevelt's intention was to convince the Chinese to keep as many of their forces in northern Burma as possible. British Prime Minister Winston Churchill preferred an amphibious assault on Sumatra (codenamed Operation Culverin), at the northern tip of the island, but there were too few resources available for such an operation. As a result, Churchill considered Admiral Louis Mountbatten, the new Supreme Allied Commander of South East Asia Command (SEAC), could instead plan to capture the Andaman Islands (Operation Buccaneer). In December the Allied leaders returned to Cairo, both Mountbatten and Stopford meeting them there, the former presenting his views to Roosevelt and Churchill. Despite his best efforts it was decided to cancel the latter operation, due to a lack of manpower and landing craft.

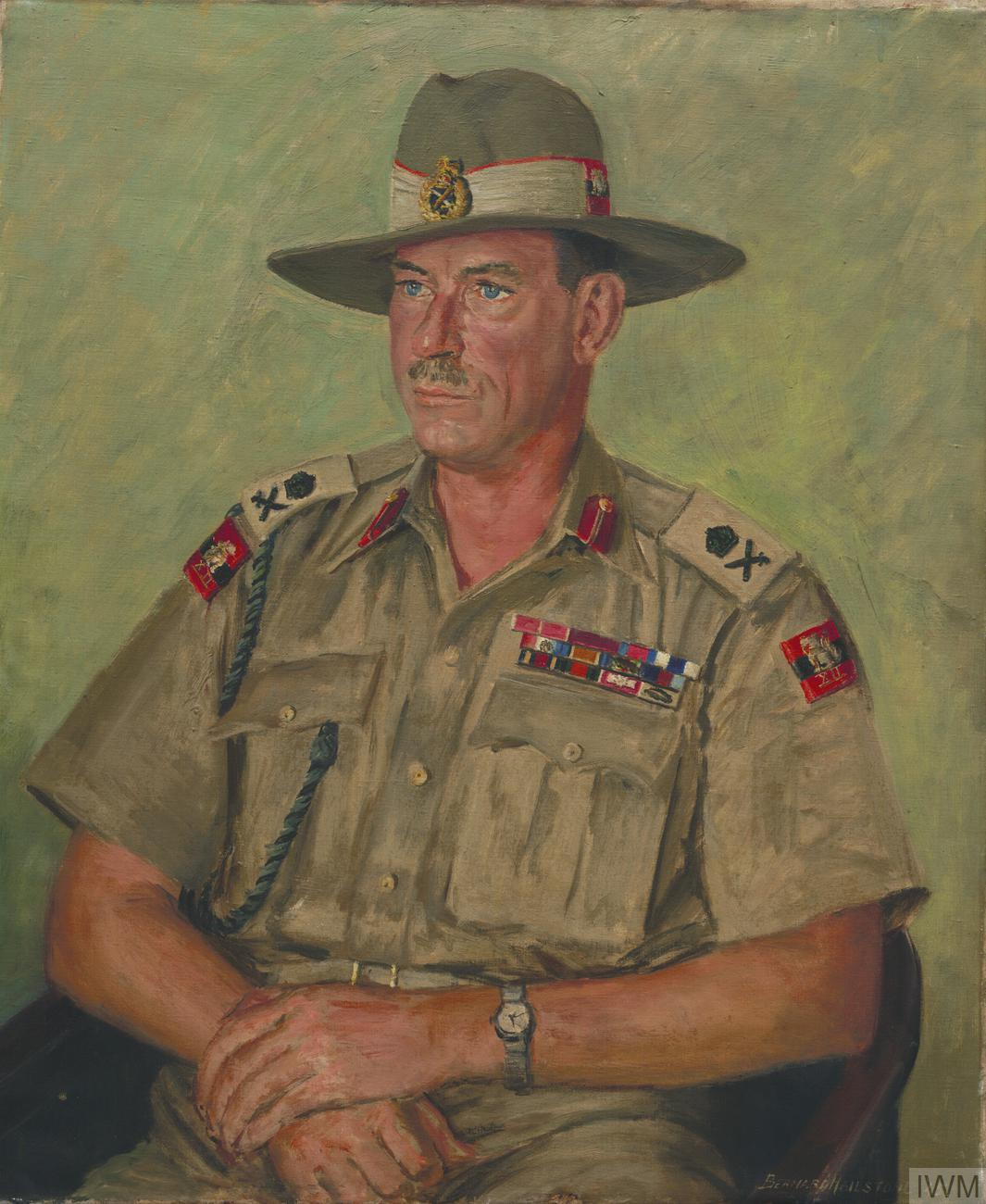
A half-length, seated portrait of Lieutenant-General Sir Montagu Stopford in uniform.

Mountbatten was not beaten and, upon returning to India, ordered Stopford to continue to train XXXIII Corps in amphibious operations, which it did so for the next months. In March 1944, the Japanese 15th Army (Lieutenant General Renya Mutaguchi), launched an offensive at the centre of the Allied front at Imphal. Lieutenant General William Slim, GOC of the Fourteenth Army and Lieutenant General Geoffry Scoones, GOC IV Corps, had both predicted a move like this by the Japanese and Scoones, whose corps was holding the sector, withdrew to a more defensible sector. Slim had failed to estimate the arrival of the Japanese 31st Division (Lieutenant General Kōtoku Satō), which headed for Kohima, 80 mi (130 km) north of Imphal. If the 31st Division were able to take the small town of Kohima, they would be almost unopposed and be able to march into Assam, cutting land communications to Ledo, at the Indian end of the Ledo Road, then being built to China.

The British first received reports that the Japanese were aiming for Kohima from the local Naga people, and from V Force patrols, in the third week of March. The 1st Battalion, Assam Regiment moved west to Jessami to intercept them. On 28 March fighting began and continued for another two days, gaining valuable time. The battalion, only very recently raised, fighting against a numerically superior force, was forced to withdraw to Kohima. At the same time Colonel Hugh Richards had arrived to take command of the garrison at Kohima, which was substantially outnumbered. Slim made a decision for the 161st Indian Brigade, detached from the 5th Indian Infantry Division, to be flown into Dimapur, and to move into Kohima, arriving there on 29 March, after receiving reports on the Japanese strength. Slim also placed Major General Robert Ranking, GOC 202nd Lines of Communication Area (202 LoC), in temporary command of the area.

Realising that Scoones would be unable to control the Kohima battle, Slim asked his superior, General Sir George Giffard, commander of the 11th Army Group, for Stopford and his HQ XXXIII Corps to be flown out from India. Stopford, establishing his HQ on 3 April at Jorhat, took over from Ranking, and began to assess the situation. He outlined the priorities as Dimapur, the Ledo Road and Kohima and ordered the 161st Indian Infantry Brigade to defend the Nichugard Pass, safeguarding Dimapur but leaving Kohima uncovered. Priorities changed, following a consultation with Slim and Kohima was now made the priority, and the 161st Indian Infantry Brigade was ordered to return. The 4th Queen's Own Royal West Kent Regiment (4th Royal West Kents) and a company of the 4th Battalion, 7th Rajput Regiment managed to reinforce the Kohima garrison, which consisted of a significant number of non-combat troops, before the town was surrounded. The remainder of the 161st Indian Infantry Brigade was cut off at Jotsoma, a few miles back from the road to Dimapur.

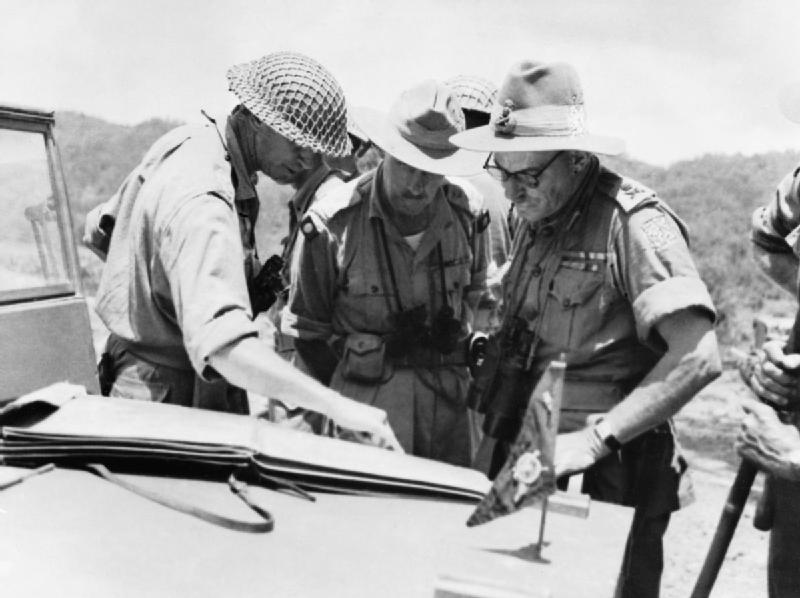
Lieutenant General Montagu Stopford, GOC XXXIII Indian Corps (right), confers with Major General John Grover, GOC 2nd Division (left) and Brigadier Joseph Salomons, commanding the 9th Indian Brigade (centre), after the opening of the Imphal-Kohima road, June 1944.

The initial defence of Kohima, therefore, was conducted by a far smaller force than was necessary. Fighting in very grim conditions reminiscent of the First World War, the force managed to hold on during a siege that lasted over two weeks, the British and Indian troops being boxed in on Garrison Hill. The distance between them and the Japanese was the length of the local District Commissioner's tennis court. Three Indian mountain batteries at Jotsoma were initially the only outside support. The 2nd Division (Major General Grover) broke the road block between Jotsoma and Dimapur, thus enabling the 161st Indian Infantry Brigade to relieve the defenders of Kohima on 18 April.

Stopford's objective was to drive the Japanese away from Kohima, the 2nd Division being the main initial tool for the job, although significant reinforcements were on the way. These consisted of the 23rd Infantry Brigade, which had been intended to join the Chindits, and the 21st Indian Division (Major General Cameron Nicholson) a temporary creation. Stopford knew Nicholson as a fellow instructor at the Staff College before the war, to take command of other units who had been brought up from India. The 6th Brigade of the 2nd Division relieved the 161st Indian Brigade and continued to hold Garrison Hill against a succession of Japanese assaults. The division's 4th Infantry Brigade undertook a right hook flanking movement to come in from the south, against the Aradura Spur, while the 5th Infantry Brigade began a left hook from the north. Both brigade assaults did not meet with the expected success. The 33rd Indian Infantry Brigade (Brigadier Frederick Loftus-Tottenham), part of the 7th Indian Infantry Division (Major General Frank Messervy), arrived from the Arakan and, assisted by the 6th Brigade, cleared the enemy from Kohima Ridge. The fighting was relentless as the Japanese remained in two strong defensive preparations, on the Aradura Ridge and around Naga Village. The 2nd Division, which by now was severely depleted but pushed them off Aradura Ridge in early June, the 7th Indian Division pushing them out of Naga Village around the same time. The Japanese retreated to the Chindwin River and, on 22 June, XXXIII Corps met IV Corps.

The battle over, Stopford made the decision to sack Grover and to replace him with Nicholson. During the Kohima fighting Stopford had begun to lose confidence in Grover, believing him to be too slow and cautious, as well as apparently having handled Indian units under his command rather unsatisfactorily, and, after consulting with Slim, had him sacked. This did not initially go down well with the division which, after its losses, spent the next few months recuperating. XXXIII Corps continued to clear the Japanese from the country to the west of the Chindwin River and north of Ukhrul, on 31 July taking over from IV Corps, which returned to India to rest. During the end of the summer and in the early stages of autumn the pursuit of the retreating Japanese continued and the 5th Indian Infantry Division (Major General Geoffrey Evans) along with the Lushai Brigade (both of which now formed part of XXXIII Corps), pursued the Japanese towards Tiddim and into the Chin Hills. At the same time the 11th (East Africa) Infantry Division (Major General Charles Fowkes) under XXXIII Corps cleared the Kabaw Valley, later establishing a bridgehead across the Chindwin River.

On 3 December the 80th Indian Infantry Brigade, part of the 20th Indian Division (Major General Douglas Gracey, which joined XXXIII Corps in July), crossed the Chindwin River at Mawlaik, and turned south. The day afterwards the 19th Indian INfantry Division (Major General Thomas Rees) crossed the river further north at Sittaung, heading eastwards. The corps, spearheaded by the 20th Indian Division, with the 2nd Division following up behind, crossed, on 18 December, the longest Bailey bridge in the world near Kalewa. Slim wanted to deceive the Japanese into believing that XXXIII Indian Corps was their main threat. Slim, knowing that the Japanese were planning to withdraw behind the Irrawaddy River, wished to surprise them, with XXXIII Corps being seen as the main threat, while IV Corps (Lieutenant General Frank Messervy) approached stealthily through the Chin Hills with the intention of crossing the Irrawaddy in the south and west.

On 15 December 1944 he and his fellow corps commanders, Christison and Scoones, were knighted and invested as Knights Commander of the Order of the British Empire by Lord Wavell, the Viceroy of India, at a ceremony at Imphal in front of Scottish, Gurkha and Punjab regiments. Slim was knighted and invested as a Knight Commander of the Order of the Bath at the same occasion. Stopford executed his superiors' order to the letter as, in mid-January 1945, the 19th Indian Infantry Division established two bridgeheads across the river, north of the city of Mandalay, and in late February the division moved towards the city. The 20th Indian Division reached the river in late January, crossing in mid-February, while the 2nd Division formed a bridgehead on 25 February. The two divisions began to expand their bridgeheads but the 19th Indian Infantry Division won the race to capture Mandalay, which fell on 20 March.

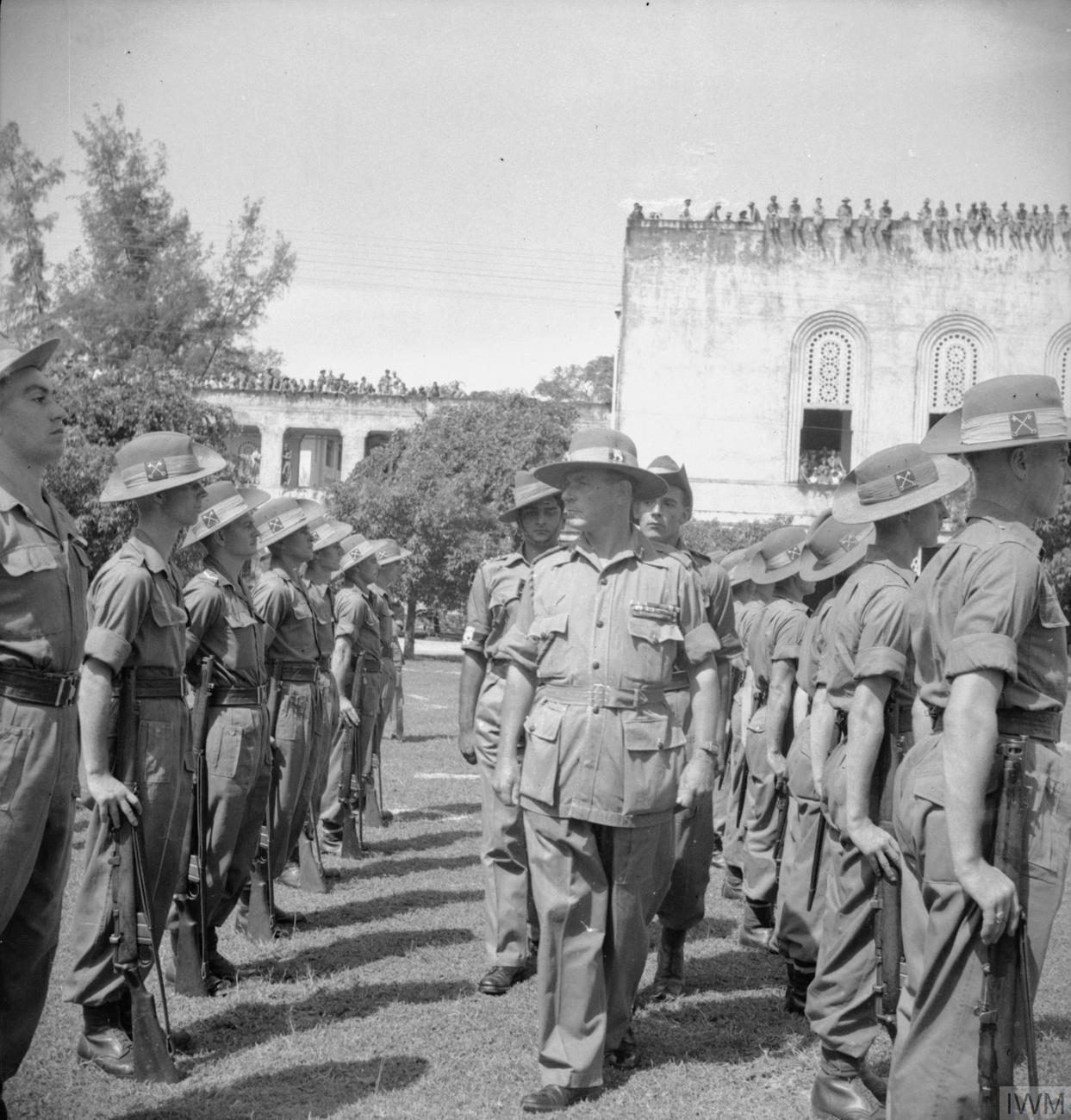
Lieutenant General Sir Montagu Stopford, GOC-in-C of the British 12th Army, inspects a guard of honour mounted by men of the 1st Battalion, Royal Berkshire Regiment, during the formal ceremony in Rangoon where General Heitarō Kimura and his staff handed over their swords to staff officers of the 12th Army.

IV Corps had, at the same time, taken Meiktila, holding it off against several determined Japanese counterattacks. This meant the end for any hopes the Japanese may still have had about retaining hold of Burma. In early May Lieutenant General Slim declared his intention of capturing Rangoon before the arrival of the monsoon. Lieutenant General Messervy's IV Corps took the Railway Valley towards Toungoo, and Stopford's XXXIII Indian Corps, with the 7th and 20th Indian Divisions now under command, advanced on both sides of the Irrawaddy. Rangoon fell in early May, by which time XXXIII Corps had cleared the river south of Prome.

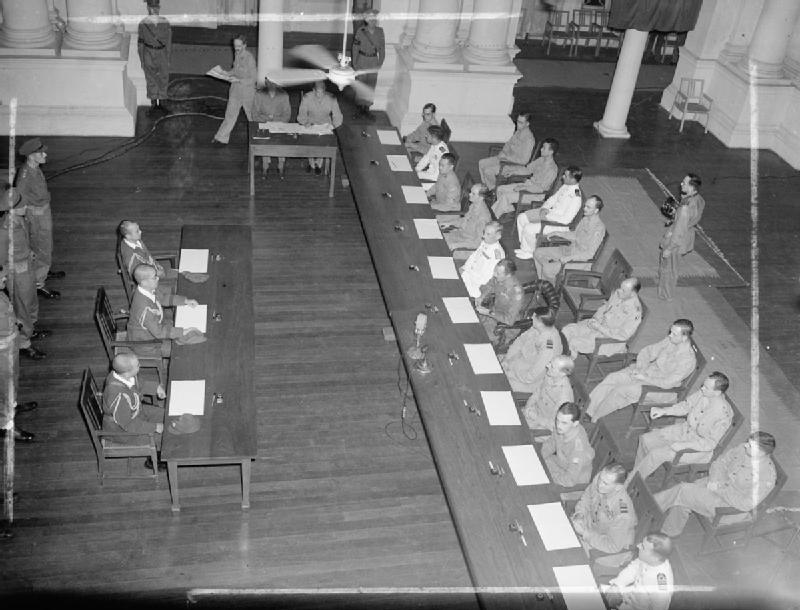
In the Throne Room, Government House, Rangoon, which was used for the surrender negotiations, Lieutenant General Takazo Numata with Lieutenant Colonel Morio Tomura (left) and Rear Admiral Kaigye Chudo (right) faces the Allied commanders (front row, l to r): Brigadier E. G. Gibbons, Captain F. S. Habecker, Major General Feng Yee, Mr M. E. Dening, Rear Admiral W. R. Patterson, Lieutenant General F. A. M. Browning, Air Marshal Sounders, Major General R. F. Denning, Brigadier M. S. K. Maunsell, Air Vice Marshal A. T. Cole and Captain J. P. H. Perks. In the rear row, seated to Lieutenant General Browning's left is Lieutenant General Sir Montagu Stopford.

Confirmed in his rank of lieutenant general in April 1945, in late May Stopford's XXXIII Indian Corps HQ was redesignated as the new HQ British Twelfth Army. The Twelfth Army now took responsibility for finishing the final stages of the campaign in Burma, allowing the HQ Fourteenth Army to return to India, to plan for future operations, specifically the recapture of Malaya. The battle under Stopford's command would become known as the Battle of the Sittang Bend. The remaining Japanese in the Irrawaddy Valley, numbering roughly 30,000 troops, attempted to cross the Pegu Yoma Hills and the Sittang River, into the supposed safety of the Karen Hills, bordering Thailand. Given Lieutenant General Messervy's IV Corps, with three divisions under command, the Twelfth Army inflicted severe losses upon the Japanese troops, a significant number of whom were suffering from starvation or otherwise ill. As it turned out, this was to be the last major land action fought by the Western Allies during the Second World War as, in mid-August, the Japanese surrendered in Tokyo. Stopford gave orders for all offensive operations to cease, and soon began negotiations with the Japanese, which culminated in their surrender at Rangoon in mid-September. The following month, at another ceremony, General Heitarō Kimura, commander of the Japanese Burma Area Army, handed over to Stopford his sword.

== Postwar ==
After the war Stopford served as commander of Burma Command (renamed from Twelfth Army) from 1945 to 1946, as C-in-C Allied Land Forces in the Dutch East Indies in 1946 and as C-in-C SEAC from 1946 to 1947 before becoming General Officer Commanding-in-Chief (GOC-in-C) of Northern Command in England from 1947 to 1949. He retired from the British Army in 1949, with the rank of full general, having been promoted to that rank in October 1946. He was also appointed Colonel-in-Chief of the Rifle Brigade.

After the war Stopford was further made a Knight Commander of the Order of the Bath in 1947 and a Knight Grand Cross of the Order of the Bath in 1948. He was Colonel Commandant of the Rifle Brigade from 1951 to 1958, and Chairman of the Army Cadet Force Association from 1951 to 1961, later becoming vice president from 1961. In 1962 he held the honorary post of Deputy Lieutenant of Oxfordshire and lived at Rock Hill House in Chipping Norton. He married Dorothy Deare, daughter of Lieutenant Colonel Henry Foulkes Deare, on 12 April 1921. They had no children. His wife died on 4 October 1982.

== Bibliography ==
- Smart, Nick (2005). Biographical Dictionary of British Generals of the Second World War. Barnesley: Pen & Sword. ISBN 1844150496.
- Mead, Richard (2007). Churchill's Lions: a biographical guide to the key British generals of World War II. Stroud (UK): Spellmount. ISBN 978-1-86227-431-0.
- Williams, David. The Black Cats at War: The Story of the 56th (London) Division T.A., 1939–1945 ISBN 1-870423-89-5.

Military offices
Preceded by Claude Liardet	GOC 56th (London) Infantry Division; January–October 1941	Succeeded by Eric Miles
Preceded by Robert Collins	Commandment of the Staff College, Camberley; 1941–1942	Succeeded by Sir Alan Cunningham
Preceded by James Gammell	GOC XII Corps; 1942–1943	Succeeded by Neil Ritchie
Preceded by Philip Christison	GOC XXXIII Indian Corps; 1944–1945	Post redesignated Twelfth Army
New command	GOC Twelfth Army; May–November 1945	Post redesignated Burma Command
Preceded by Earl Mountbatten	GOC-in-C South East Asia Command; April–September 1946	Post disbanded
Preceded by Sir Philip Christison	GOC-in-C Northern Command; 1947–1949	Succeeded by Sir Philip Balfour
