= Philip Christison =

British Army general (1893–1993)

General Sir Philip Christison Bt GBE CB DSO MC*
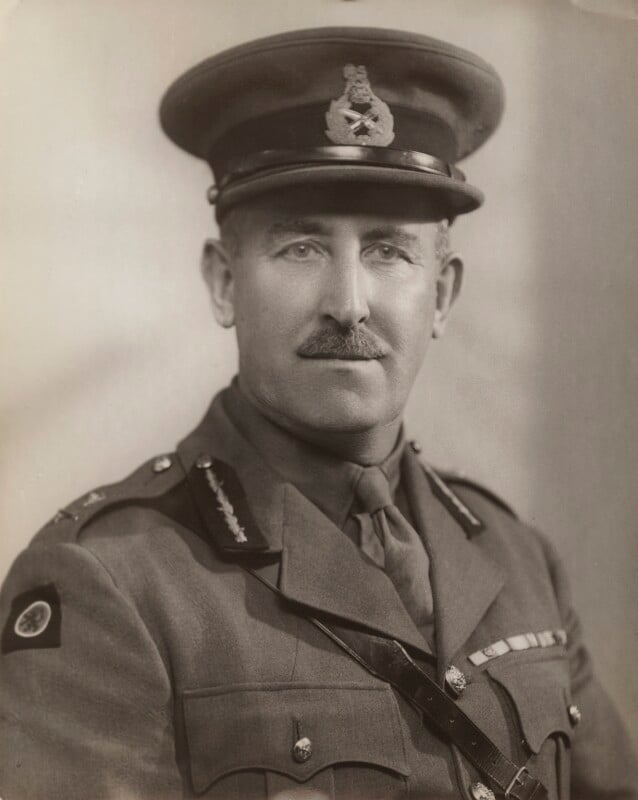
- Christison in 1941
- Born: 17 November 1893; Edinburgh, Scotland
- Died: 21 December 1993 (aged 100); Melrose, Roxburghshire, Scotland
- Burial place: Holy Trinity Church, Melrose, Scotland
- Military career
- Allegiance: United Kingdom
- Branch: British Army
- Service years: 1914–1949
- Rank: General
- Nickname: "Christie"
- Service number: 9487
- Units: Queen's Own Cameron Highlanders; Duke of Wellington's Regiment
- Commands: Scottish Command (1947–1949); Northern Command (1946–1947); Allied Forces, Dutch East Indies (1945–1946); Allied Land Forces, South East Asia (1945); XV Indian Corps (1943–1945); XXXIII Indian Corps (1942–1943); 15th (Scottish) Infantry Division (1941–1942); Staff College, Quetta (1940–1941); Quetta Brigade (1938–1940); 2nd Battalion, Duke of Wellington's Regiment (1937–1938)
- Conflicts: First World War; Second World War; Indonesian National Revolution
- Awards: Knight Grand Cross of the Order of the British Empire; Companion of the Order of the Bath; Companion of the Distinguished Service Order; Military Cross & Bar; Mentioned in Despatches (2); Grand Cordon of the Order of the Cloud and Banner (China)
- Other work: Secretary of the Scottish Education Department

General Sir Alexander Frank Philip Christison, 4th Baronet, GBE, CB, DSO, MC* (17 November 1893 – 21 December 1993) was a British Army officer who served with distinction during the world wars. After service as a junior officer on the Western Front in the First World War, he later distinguished himself during the Second World War, where he commanded XV Indian Corps, part of Sir William Slim's Fourteenth Army, during the Burma campaign. He then went on to have a successful postwar career, and lived to the age of 100.

== Early life and First World War ==
Philip Christison was born on 17 November 1893 in Edinburgh, Scotland the eldest son of five children of Sir Alexander Christison, 3rd Baronet and his second wife, Florence. He was educated at Edinburgh Academy and University College, Oxford where, as a cadet in the latter's Officer Training Corps (OTC), he was made a second lieutenant in March 1914, shortly before the outbreak of the First World War that August.

As with so many others of his generation, the outbreak of war in August 1914 saw Christison volunteering for service with the British Army. Subsequently, he was commissioned as a temporary second lieutenant into the 6th (Service) Battalion of the Queen's Own Cameron Highlanders on 5 September 1914. The battalion, a Kitchener's Army unit created from volunteers, formed part of the 45th Brigade of the 15th (Scottish) Division and, after training in the United Kingdom, departed for the Western Front in July 1915. He saw action in the battles of Loos (where he was wounded and awarded the Military Cross), the Somme and Arras. Promoted to lieutenant on 11 February 1917, in July 1917 he was awarded a Bar to his Military Cross. The citation for this award reads:

His Majesty the KING has been graciously pleased to award a Bar to the Military Cross to the undermentioned Officers.
2nd Lt. (temp. Capt.) Alexander Frank Philip Christison, M.C., Cam. Highrs.
For conspicuous gallantry and devotion to duty. He displayed the utmost courage and determination in pushing back the enemy and clearing the north side of the village. By his tireless energy he succeeded in getting the position consolidated under heavy fire. (Military Cross gazetted 14th January, 1916.)

Promoted to captain on 4 August 1917, three years since the outbreak of war, on 24 October 1918 he was promoted to the acting rank of major, and served as second-in-command (2IC) with the 1/6th Battalion, Seaforth Highlanders, a Territorial Force (TF) unit, part of the 152nd (Seaforth and Cameron) Brigade of the 51st (Highland) Division. The war came to an end soon after, with the signing of the Armistice with Germany on 11 November 1918.

== Between the wars ==
In August 1919, he relinquished his last wartime appointment and reverted to the rank of captain, and, by now a Regular Army officer, served with his regiment's 2nd Battalion, then serving in Germany as part of the British Army of the Rhine. From 19 April 1920 Christison returned to the United Kingdom and took up the post of adjutant of a Territorial Army (TA) unit.

After vacating his position as adjutant of the 4th Battalion, King's Own Scottish Borderers, another TA unit, in November 1923, Christison was assistant manager of the British Olympic team in Paris in 1924 which was followed by a further appointment as an adjutant, this time with his regiment. Still a captain, he attended the Staff College, Camberley from January 1927 to December 1928. His fellow students there included several who, like Christison, would eventually rise to high command, such as Oliver Leese, John Whiteley, Evelyn Barker, Robert Bridgeman, Eric Dorman-Smith, Ronald Penney and John Hawkesworth. His instructors included the likes of Richard O'Connor, Bernard Paget, Edwin Morris, Harold Franklyn, Henry Pownall, George Giffard and Bernard Montgomery. Shortly after graduating from Camberley he was appointed as a General Staff Officer Grade 3 (GSO3) at the War Office.

Having been promoted to the brevet rank of major on 1 January 1930, a sign of approval and likely future promotion at a time when prospects for promotion in the peacetime army were slow, Christison saw service from 22 January 1931 as the brigade major (a brigade's senior staff officer) of the 1st Infantry Division's 3rd Brigade, relinquishing the appointment on 20 January 1933. He was promoted to major on 4 November 1933. On 1 January 1934 Christison was promoted to brevet lieutenant-colonel and returned to the Staff College, Camberley as an instructor (GSO2) where he became good friends with a fellow instructor, William Slim.

On 18 March 1937, Christison, due to a lack of promotion in his own regiment, transferred to the Duke of Wellington's Regiment (DWR) where he received an immediate promotion to lieutenant-colonel, and was appointed commanding officer (CO) of the 2nd Battalion, DWR in the Multan area of the Punjab, North-West Frontier Province. On 18 February 1938 he was promoted to colonel and, on the same date, to the temporary rank of brigadier, and was selected to command the Quetta Brigade in India, an unusual posting for a British Army officer.

== Second World War ==
Christison remained in command of the brigade until 15 March 1940, over six months since outbreak of the Second World War, when, at the relatively young age of 46, he was made Commandant of the Staff College, Quetta in the former British India (now Pakistan). The length of the course at the college had, in pre-war days, lasted almost two years, but had now been reduced to a relatively brief period of five months, due to the outbreak of war and the urgent need to train large numbers of competent staff officers to fill the increasing number of jobs for the expanding British and Indian Armies.

In May 1941 Christison returned to the United Kingdom and, after serving briefly as a Brigadier General Staff (BGS), on 17 June 1941 was promoted to the acting rank of major-general and became general officer commanding (GOC) of the 15th (Scottish) Infantry Division, taking over from Major-General Sir Oliver Leese, who had been a fellow student at the Staff College in the late 1920s, and who he would encounter later in the war. The division, with the 44th, 45th and 46th Brigades along with supporting divisional troops under control, was slightly different from that which he had served during the First World War, being a second line TA formation, composed largely of part-time soldiers and, instead of recruiting from all over Scotland, now recruited mainly from the Scottish Lowlands.

Following this, in June 1942, he returned to India, after handing over the 15th Division to Major-General Charles Bullen-Smith. On 5 July 1942 his rank of major-general was made permanent. After a short appointment as a military district commander, he was promoted to the acting rank of lieutenant-general on 12 November 1942 and became GOC of XXXIII Indian Corps. On 1 January 1943 he was made a Companion of the Order of the Bath. His rank of lieutenant-general was made temporary on 12 November 1943. He handed over XXXIII Corps to Lieutenant-General Montagu Stopford in mid-November 1943 and then assumed command of the XV Indian Corps, part of the new Fourteenth Army, succeeding Lieutenant-General William Slim, who he knew from years before as a fellow instructor at the Staff College, and had been promoted to command the Fourteenth Army. The XV Corps made up the Southern Front of the Burma campaign in the coastal region known as the Arakan.

During the Second Arakan Offensive in February 1944, XV Corps advanced southwards. A Japanese attempt to outflank and isolate elements of the Corps failed when the 7th Indian Infantry Division held off the attacks and the Corps' administrative area–the "Admin Box"–defeated attacks by the Japanese 55th Division in the Battle of the Admin Box. This was the first time in the Second World War that a British army had defeated the Japanese in a land battle. XV Corps was withdrawn on 22 March to participate in the Battle of Imphal. In December 1944 Christison and his fellow corps commanders, Lieutenant-Generals Montagu Stopford and Geoffry Scoones, were knighted and invested as Knights Commander of the Order of the British Empire by the viceroy Lord Wavell at a ceremony at Imphal in front of the Scottish, Gurkha and Punjab regiments. Slim was knighted and invested as Knight Commander of the Order of the Bath at the same occasion.

In 1945, Christison assumed temporary command of the Fourteenth Army and also deputised for Slim as Commander of Allied Land Forces, South East Asia when Slim was on leave, reverting to XV Corps on Slim's return. Christison led XV Corps into Rangoon in May of that year.

In September 1945 Christison deputised for Admiral Lord Louis Mountbatten as commander of South East Asia Command, and took the surrender of the Japanese Seventh Area Army and Japanese South Sea Fleet at Singapore on 3 September. Christison on 29 September 1945 became the Allied Commander of forces in Indonesia. In November, Christison's troops were involved in the Battle of Surabaya against pro-Independence Indonesian soldiers and militia in Surabaya. Christison's stance on negotiations with the Indonesian nationalists was criticised by the Dutch and eventually at the end of January 1946 he was relieved of his command by Lord Mountbatten.

== Postwar ==
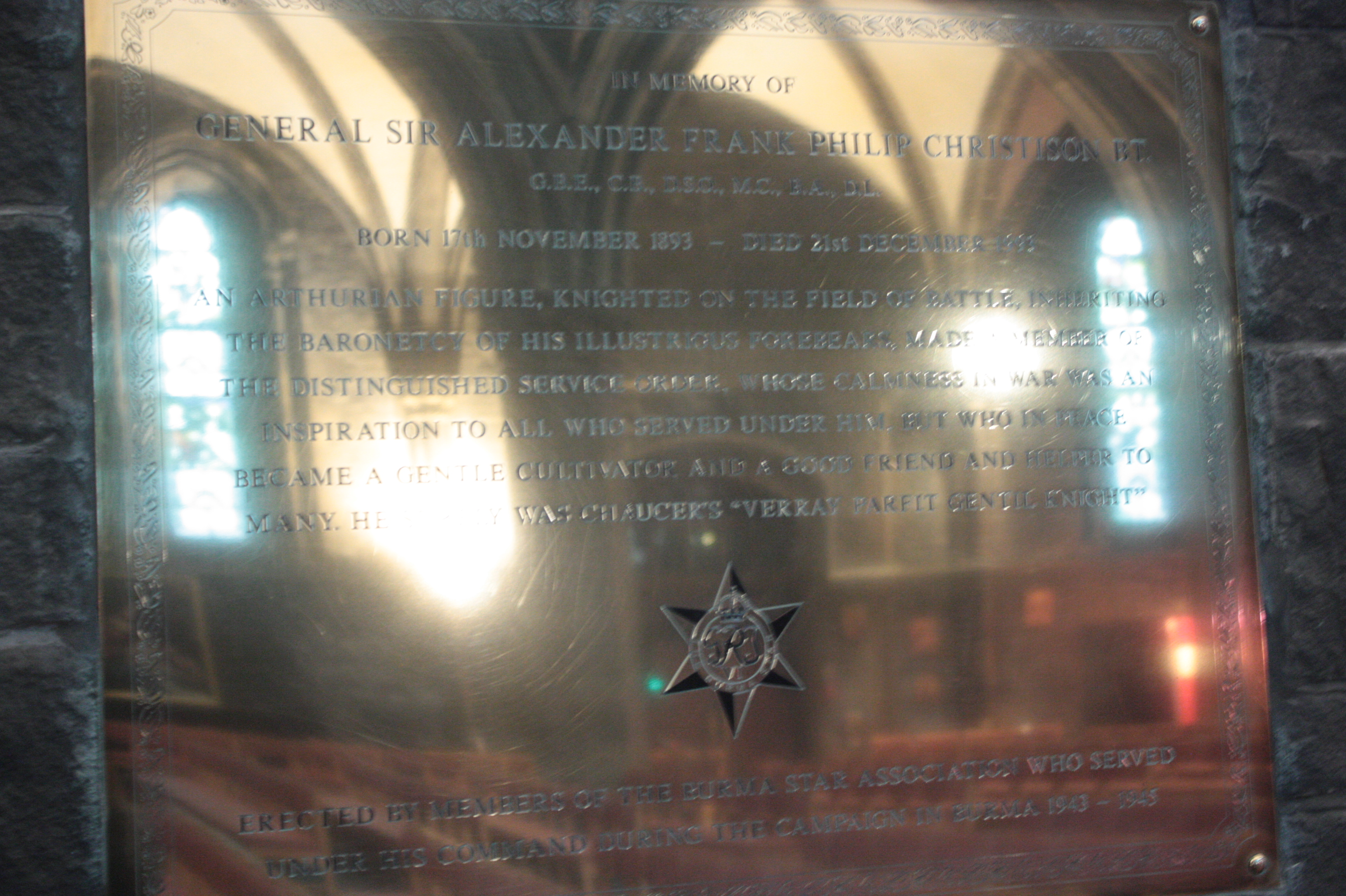
Plaque to General Sir Philip Christison, St Mary's Episcopal Cathedral, Edinburgh.

He published his journal article on Field notes about Birds species of Coastal Arakan and the Foothills of the Yomas that he and along with A. Maitland Emmet

Christison was General Officer Commanding-in-Chief (GOC-in-C) of Northern Command from 1946 to 1947; he was then GOC-in-C of Scottish Command and Governor of Edinburgh Castle from 1947 to 1949 He was promoted to full general in August 1947. He held the honorary appointments of aide-de-camp general to the King (1947 to 1949) and Colonel of his regiment, the Duke of Wellington's Regiment (1947 to 1957). In 1947 Christison was appointed Colonel of the 10th Gurkha Rifles and in late 1949 he was also made Colonel of a Territorial artillery unit.

He retired from the army in 1949 and farmed at Melrose in Scotland. During the 1950s and 1960s he was Secretary of the Scottish Education Department.

Christison married twice: to Betty Mitchell, with whom he had three daughters and a son, from 1916 until her death in 1974; and then to Vida Wallace Smith until her death in 1992. He lived to the age of 100 on 17 November 1993 but died little more than a month later, on 21 December 1993.

== Memorial ==
A brass memorial plaque to his memory lies on the south aisle of St Mary's Cathedral, Edinburgh (Episcopal).

== Bibliography ==
- Liddle, P. H. (1997). Passchendaele in Perspective: The Third Battle of Ypres. Barnsley: Pen & Sword. ISBN 978-0-85052-588-5.
- Mead, Richard (2007). Churchill's Lions: A Biographical Guide to the Key British Generals of World War II. Stroud: Spellmount. ISBN 978-1-86227-431-0.
- Smart, Nick (2005). Biographical Dictionary of British Generals of the Second World War. Barnesley: Pen & Sword. ISBN 1844150496.

Military offices
Preceded by Brodie Haig	Commandant of the Staff College, Quetta; 1940–1941	Succeeded by Coles Osborne
Preceded by Sir Oliver Leese	GOC 15th (Scottish) Infantry Division; 1941–1942	Succeeded by Charles Bullen-Smith
New post	GOC XXXIII Indian Corps; 1942–1943	Succeeded by Montagu Stopford
Preceded by William Slim	GOC XV Indian Corps; 1943–1945	Succeeded by Sir Montagu Stopford
Preceded by Sir Oliver Leese	Allied Land Forces, South East Asia; 1945–1946	Succeeded by Sir William Slim
Preceded by Sir Edwin Morris	GOC-in-C Northern Command; 1946–1947	Succeeded by Sir Montagu Stopford
Preceded by Sir Neil Ritchie	GOC-in-C Scottish Command; 1947–1949	Succeeded by Sir Gordon MacMillan
Honorary titles
Preceded by Charles Pickering	Colonel of the Duke of Wellington's Regiment; 1947–1957	Succeeded by Kenneth Exham
Preceded by ??	Colonel of the 10th Gurkha Rifles; 1947–1957	Succeeded by Michael Roberts
Baronetage of the United Kingdom
Preceded by Robert Christison	Baronet (of Moray Place); 1945–1993	Extinct
