= V Force =

British military unit in WWII

V Force was a reconnaissance, intelligence-gathering and guerrilla organisation established by the British against Japanese forces during the Burma Campaign in World War II.

== Establishment and organisation ==
In April 1942, when the Japanese drove the British Army from Burma and seemed likely to invade India, General Sir Archibald Wavell ordered the creation of a guerrilla organisation which was to operate along the frontier between India and Burma. This frontier ran for 800 miles (1,300 kilometres), from the Himalayas to the Bay of Bengal.

V Force was envisaged as a "stay-behind" force. If the Japanese had invaded India after the monsoon season ended late in 1942, V Force was to harass their lines of communications with ambushes and sabotage, and to provide intelligence from behind enemy lines. The first commander of the force was Brigadier A. Felix Williams, formerly the commander of the Tochi Scouts, a paramilitary unit on the North-west Frontier. When the Army failed to provide the 6,000 rifles it had promised to V Force, Williams arranged for weapons manufactured by gunsmiths in Darra Adam Khel to be delivered.

The force was organised into six area commands, corresponding to the Indian Civil Service administrative areas, which in turn corresponded to the ethnicity of the inhabitants of the various parts of the frontier. Each area command had a Commander, Second-in-Command, Adjutant, Quartermaster and Medical Officer, four platoons (about 100 men) of the paramilitary Assam Rifles and up to 1,000 locally enlisted guerillas or auxiliaries.

The area commanders and other officers were rarely Regular Army officers; the qualification for appointment was more often expert knowledge of the local language and peoples. Some commanders were police officers, former civil administrators, or tea planters. Even one woman, the anthropologist Ursula Graham Bower, was appointed an officer in V Force.

The Japanese did not invade India in 1942 as had been feared. V Force was able to consolidate itself in the wide area between the Allied and Japanese main forces. Bases and outposts were set up, standing patrols instituted and intelligence gathered and collated. By the end of 1943, the force had been reorganised into two main zones: Assam Zone, including Imphal and all the frontier north of it, and Arakan Zone to the south. Detachments in Tripura were disbanded as they were deep inside India and unlikely to be threatened. An American organisation (OSS Detachment 101) later took over the northernmost areas around Ledo.

When the Indian Eastern Army carried out a small-scale invasion of Japanese-occupied Arakan in early 1943, V Force provided a degree of warning about the movements of Japanese reserves to the threatened area.

== Later operations ==
The threatened invasion of India finally happened in 1944. The V Force detachments forward of Imphal were engulfed. They could provide some intelligence of Japanese moves during the invasion, but they lacked supplies (the local dumps had been drawn down over 1943) and there were too many demands on Allied transport aircraft to allow supply drops to them. As a result, they were unable to harass the Japanese lines of communication as had been planned, and had to disband or make their way back into Allied lines.

The Lushai Brigade was formed from Indian infantry battalions and several thousand of V Force's former levies in the Lushai Hills, west of Imphal. Under Brigadier P. C. Marindin, they achieved great success against the lines of communication of the Japanese 33rd Division, and later spearheaded the Fourteenth Army's advance to the Irrawaddy River west of the Chindwin River.

When the Japanese retreated late in 1944 and the Allies advanced, V Force changed its character. Small detachments of native-speaking personnel operated immediately ahead of the advancing regular formations, to gather short-range intelligence. Ambushes were also conducted against the retreating Japanese forces when possible. A very similar unit, Z Force, established by Fourteenth Army, operated further ahead, its parties being deployed by parachute between 80 and 100 miles (130 and 160 km) ahead of the main forces.

Once Burma was largely reoccupied in 1945, V Force began deploying parties in Siam and Malaya in readiness for future operations. The war ended before they could be used in their intended role.

== Results ==
=== Inter-community relations ===
In the Arakan, V Force became involved in a local conflict between the mainly Muslim Rohingya, Maugh and Buddhist Arakanese peoples. The Maughs provided most recruits for V Force, the Arakanese supported the Japanese, leading to the Arakan Massacres in 1942, and displacement of communities. Over the three years during which the Allies and Japanese fought over the Mayu peninsula, the Maughs engaged in a campaign against Arakanese communities, in many cases using weapons provided by V Force. In defence of the force, it can only be said that the conflict was no part of official policy, and possibly unavoidable in the situation.

=== Effectiveness ===
Overall, V Force provided a useful screen for the Allied armies in India during the stalemate of 1942 and 1943. It proved unable to carry out its intended role of sabotage against enemy lines of communication, although the Lushai Brigade showed what was possible with assistance from regular units.

Regular formation commanders were occasionally scathing about the intelligence provided by V Force. One such was Lieutenant-General Geoffry Scoones, Commander of IV Corps. Concerning the arrival of Japanese reinforcements at the height of the Battle of Imphal, he wrote:

Incidentally, the arrival of this Division or elements of it unheralded on this front is a pretty poor chit for our higher intelligence organisation. I sent in a long letter the other day setting out my views on the amount of money and manpower we are wasting on these hush-hush organizations and which, so far as I am concerned, produce nothing useful.

Scoones was not referring to V Force alone. However, one of his subordinates at Imphal (Major-General Douglas Gracey, commanding Indian 20th Infantry Division) broke up his best battalion (9/12th Frontier Force Regiment) to provide his own forward screen, rather than relying on V Force.

For most of the Burma campaign, Allied formation commanders treated reports from organisations such as V Force as reliable only when a British officer personally gained the information. V Force was also hampered by lack of Japanese translators or interpreters to deal with captured documents.

=== Lessons ===
V Force established certain principles in Britain's handling of guerilla or irregular operations, which were to be important in later conflicts such as the Malayan Emergency. It was accepted that "civilians" with local expertise were entitled to command regular officers. Above all, V Force depended on the goodwill and loyalty of the local populations among which they operated, and made great efforts to gain this.

== See also ==
- X Force and Y Force for Chinese forces and Z Force which fought in the Burma Campaign.
- Fort Hertz
- Force 136
