= Z Force (Burma) =

Forward observation force operating in Burma during World War II

Z Force was a forward observation force attached to the British General Staff Intelligence that operated in Burma during World War II.

Z Force's function was to obtain information for the commander of the British Fourteenth Army, General Slim. The Fourteenth Army was engaged in the prolonged Burma Campaign fighting to recapture Burma from the Japanese. Z Force was tasked to obtain information on the size and location of Japanese forces and their logistics (oil dumps, ammunition depots etc.). Z Force did this sending intelligence units into Japanese held territory that then relayed the information back to the headquarters of the Fourteenth Army by radio.

The intelligence units that went behind enemy lines were made up of expatriates and of Burmese from the Chin, Kachin and Karen peoples. The expatriates, who had worked in Burma before the war and were familiar with the jungle, were all commissioned as officers from captain to colonel. Most had been forest officers or teak foresters before the war, though some were petroleum engineers and some had worked with radio companies.

Z force operated for three years, initially penetrating Japanese lines on foot but later on they were parachuted in by the RAF who also resupplied them via parachute drops. The "highly dangerous mission in a war noted for its ferocity and bestiality" were carried out in some of the most difficult jungle terrain in the world. During the campaign Z force personnel were awarded one CBE, two DSOs, four OBEs, four MBEs, seventeen MCs with bars to two, and sixteen Burma Gallantry Medals.
