= 11th Army Group =

- Active: November 1943 to November 1944
- Type: Army group
- Role: Army Group Headquarters
- Size: One field army and additional forces
- Part of: South East Asia Command

Commanders
- Notable commanders: George Giffard

The 11th Army Group was the main British Army force in Southeast Asia during the Second World War. Although a nominally British formation, it also included large numbers of troops and formations from the British Indian Army and from British African colonies, and also Nationalist Chinese and United States units.

== Formation ==
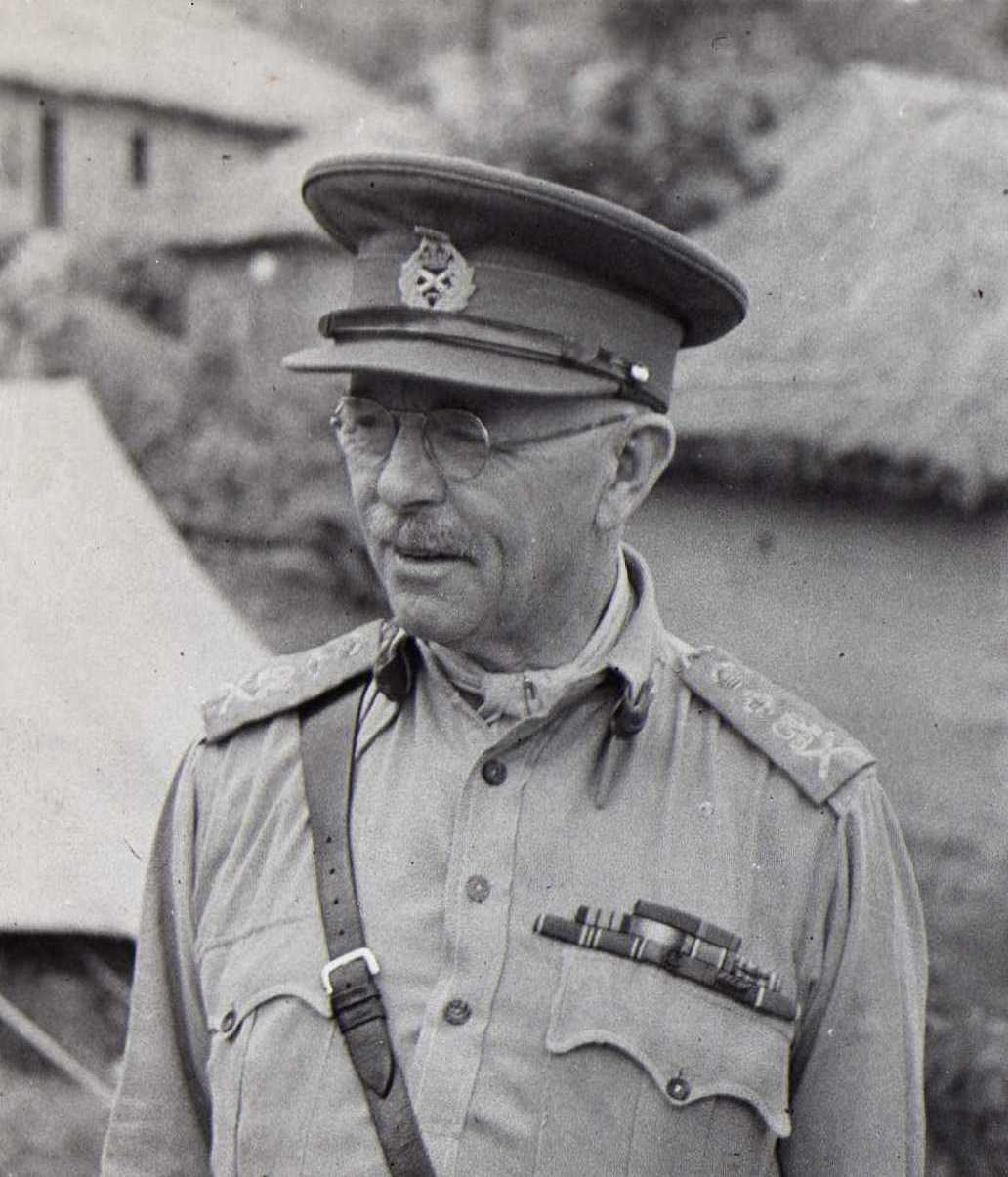
1943/44. General George Giffard, commander of 11th Army Group.

11th Army Group was activated in November 1943 to act as the land forces HQ for the newly formed South East Asia Command (SEAC), Admiral Lord Mountbatten, Supreme Commander of SEAC. The commander of 11th Army Group was General George Giffard, who had formerly been Commander-in-Chief West Africa Command and Commander of Eastern Army (part of GHQ India). The headquarters was first situated in New Delhi, eventually moving to Kandy, Ceylon. Its responsibilities were limited to the handling of operations against Japanese forces. GHQ India remained responsible for the rear areas and the training of the Army in India, although there was often overlap between the headquarters' responsibilities and (in the first year of Eleventh Army Group's existence) conflicts between their planners.

The main subordinate formations of 11th Army Group were Fourteenth Army (under General William Slim) and the Ceylon Army Command. The Indian XXXIII Corps, training in Southern India for amphibious operations, also came under Eleventh Army Group for some purposes.

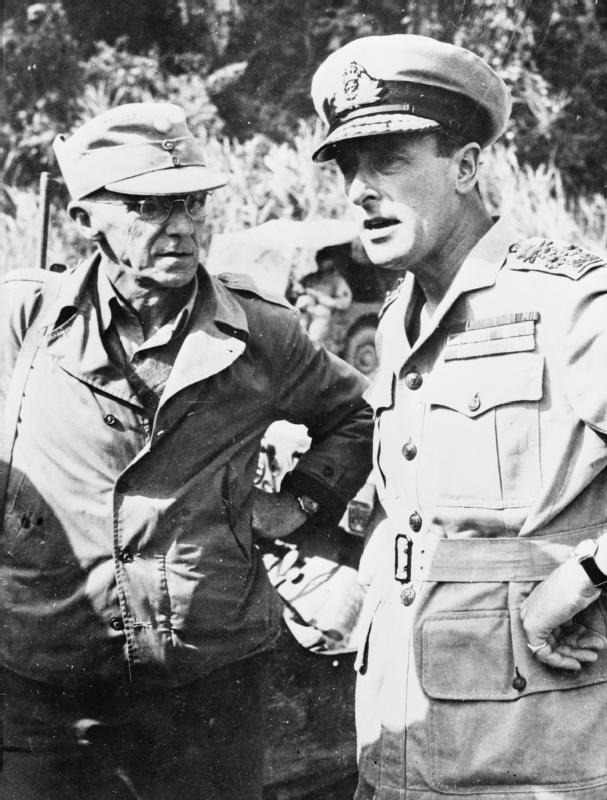
General Joseph Stilwell (left) and Lord Mountbatten (Supreme Allied Commander South East Asia) conferring during 1944.

It seemed logical that 11th Army Group should incorporate all Allied land forces, across the whole front in Burma, under a single command structure, including Northern Combat Area Command (NCAC), which was made up mostly of Republic of China Army divisions under General Joseph Stilwell, the most senior officer among US forces in China, Burma and India. Stilwell controlled significant forces: while NCAC units were to advance from Ledo (India), towards Myitkyina (Burma), to cover the construction of the Ledo Road, Stilwell also commanded the Chinese Expeditionary Force (CEA), which would advance into Burma from the north-east, out of Yunnan. If both of Stilwell's commands were placed under the 11th Army Group at the same level as the Fourteenth Army, the attacks could then be co-ordinated at Army Group level. As Stilwell was also Deputy Supreme Commander of SEAC and, technically, already Giffard's superior, this would have meant Stilwell relinquishing day-to-day field control of NCAC and CEA forces. However, Stilwell rejected this suggestion; he and Giffard had very different personalities and a poor relationship in general. Slim later commented wryly: "Stilwell ... bitterly resisted... To watch Stilwell ... shift his opposition [to Gifford] from one of ... his numerous Allied, American and Chinese offices, to another was a lesson in mobile offensive-defence." At a meeting organized by Mountbatten, to solve the problem, Stilwell surprised the others present by agreeing that, while he would direct NCAC and CEA in the field, "I am prepared to come under General Slim's operational control until I get to Kamaing". In effect, Stilwell would both temporarily become Slim's deputy and, de facto, temporarily vacate his role as Deputy Commander of SEAC. That is, Slim would continue to report to Giffard in regard to Fourteenth Army, but would report directly to Mountbatten in regard to NCAC/CEA. Mountbatten accepted this temporary command structure.

In practice, Slim found that he was able to work well with Stilwell and "this illogical command set-up worked surprisingly well". Once Stilwell's forces reached Kamaing on 20 May 1944, the arrangement ceased and Stilwell again took orders only from Mountbatten.

== Allied Land Forces South East Asia ==
On 12 November 1944, Eleventh Army Group was redesignated Allied Land Forces South East Asia (ALFSEA). General Sir Oliver Leese succeeded Giffard in command. (Mountbatten's Chief of Staff, Lieutenant General Pownall, had been lobbying for some time for Leese to be appointed, but Leese could not be relieved of command of Eighth Army for several months).

Many of the land command problems in South East Asia had been relieved when General Stilwell was recalled to Washington on 19 October, at the behest of Generalissimo Chiang Kai-shek. His replacement as commander of NCAC and the administrative HQ U.S. Forces, India-Burma Theater (USFIBT) was Lieutenant General Sultan. (Stilwell's replacements for his other responsibilities were Lieutenant General Wedemeyer as Chief of Staff to Chiang Kai-shek and General Wheeler as Deputy Supreme Commander, SEAC.)

As part of the reorganisation, NCAC was placed directly under ALFSEA, although they were also subject to directives from Chiang. Indian XV Corps, commanded by Lieutenant General Christison, was removed from command of Fourteenth Army and subordinated directly to ALFSEA. The Corps was responsible for operations in Burma's coastal Arakan Province, and had its own separate lines of communication and supply. Fourteenth Army, still under Slim's command, was the largest component of ALFSEA, making the main attack into Central Burma.

After the capture of Rangoon in May 1945, British Twelfth Army was formed in Burma, and became part of ALFSEA. Indian XV Corps reverted to the command of Fourteenth Army, which was preparing amphibious operations to recover Malaya. NCAC had previously ceased active operations. Leese was relieved and replaced as commander of ALFSEA by General Slim.

After Japan surrendered in August 1945, ALFSEA was responsible for deploying troops into Malaya, the Dutch East Indies, Thailand and French Indo-China to disarm Japanese forces and repatriate Allied prisoners of war. The headquarters was closed down later in the year.

== See also ==
- List of British Empire divisions in the Second World War
