= XXXIII Corps (British India) =

Formation of the Indian Army, 1942 to 1945

- Active: 1942–1945
- Country: (British Raj) British India
- Allegiance: British Empire
- Branch: British Indian Army
- Type: Corps

Commanders
- Notable commanders: Philip Christison; Montagu Stopford

The British Indian XXXIII Corps was a corps-sized formation of the Indian Army during the Second World War. It was disbanded and the headquarters was recreated as an Army headquarters in 1945.

== Formation ==
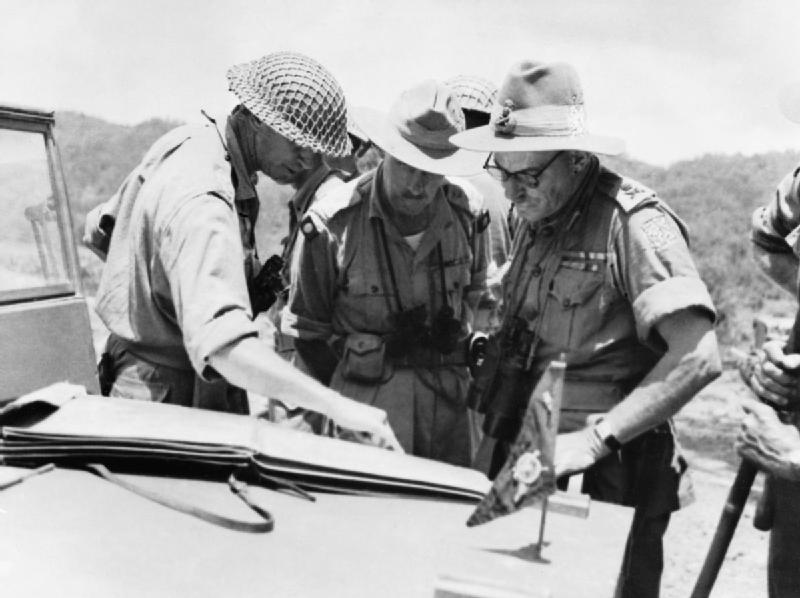
General Sir Montagu Stopford, GOC XXXIII Indian Corps (right), confers with Major General J M L Grover, GOC 2nd Division (left) and Brigadier J A Salomons, Commander 9th Indian Brigade (centre), after the opening of the Imphal-Kohima road.

The Corps was created at Bangalore in India on 15 August 1942. Its first commander was Lieutenant General Philip Christison. On 15 October 1943, Christison was transferred to command Indian XV Corps, which was then about to go into action in the Burma Campaign, and replaced as commander of XXXIII Corps by Lieutenant General Montagu Stopford.

For much of its early history, the Corps was stationed in Southern India, preparing troops for several planned amphibious operations against the Japanese in the Indian Ocean.

=== Fourteenth Army ===
The corps was added to the order of battle of Fourteenth Army during the crisis of spring 1944. Japanese forces were besieging the British force at Imphal, with a detachment blocking the only road by which they could be relieved at Kohima. XXXIII Corps was dispatched to command the relief effort mounted from Assam.

Its units were first concentrated around Dimapur, a vital railhead and logistic depot. Once sufficient troops had arrived, the British 2nd Division relieved the surrounded Indian 161st Brigade, which in turn relieved the defenders of Kohima. For several weeks, 2nd Division, joined later by the 7th Indian Infantry Division made repeated attacks to drive the Japanese from the positions they had captured on Kohima ridge, while the British 23rd Brigade (a Chindit formation) cut the Japanese lines of communication. Once the Japanese were forced into a retreat, the corps drove south to relieve Imphal. On 22 June 1944, troops from XXXIII Corps met Indian forces advancing north from Imphal, relieving the siege. The Corps then undertook the elimination of Japanese forces around Ukhrul, and the administration of several divisions resting after the battles.

Late in 1944, a general offensive to liberate Burma began. At the start of the operation (Operation Capital), the XXXIII Corps was the right flank striking force of Fourteenth Army, with IV Corps on its left. After it was realised that the Japanese had forestalled the attack by withdrawing behind the Irrawaddy River, the corps became the left flank formation, attacking into the Shwebo Plain between the Chindwin River and the Irrawaddy. It consisted of the British 2nd Division, the Indian 19th and 20th Divisions, the motorised Indian 268th Infantry Brigade and the Grant and Stuart tanks of the 254th Indian Tank Brigade.

During late February, the corps captured bridgeheads over the Irrawaddy on a wide front, distracting Japanese attention from the main thrust by IV Corps. During March, it launched its own offensives. The city of Mandalay was captured by the 19th Division, and the Japanese armies on the Irrawaddy were shattered.

After a brief period of reorganisation, the corps was switched once again to the right flank of Fourteenth Army. The British 2nd Division was returned to India, and the Indian 20th Division took over its vehicles. During April, the corps (now consisting of the Indian 7th and 20th Divisions) advanced south down the Irrawaddy River valley. In early May, it linked up with other Indian troops who had captured Rangoon, the capital.

=== Transformation ===
The Allied command in Burma was rearranged in May, shortly after Rangoon fell. The Headquarters of XXXIII Corps was transformed into that of British Twelfth Army with Stopford promoted to the new command, with responsibility for further operations in Burma including the defeat of the Japanese breakout attempt in the Pegu Yomas in July and August 1945.

=== Post 1945 ===
XXXIII Corps (India) was re-raised in 1960.
