= Operation Culverin =

Operation Culverin was a planned operation in World War II, in which Allied troops would recapture the northern tip of Sumatra (the present day province of Aceh) from the Japanese. "Culverin" was a code name for "Operations against northern Sumatra / Malaya" and "First Culverin" (originally "Junior Culverin") was "Operations against northern Sumatra" alone. It was never carried out. Lack of resources prevented it being mounted as originally planned, and other events later made it unnecessary.

The idea was first put forward by Winston Churchill at the Quebec Conference on August 20, 1943, for an operation in May and June 1944. He was dissatisfied by the existing scope of Allied plans for the South East Asian Theatre for 1943 and 1944. In his vision, by seizing northern Sumatra, "we should be striking and seizing a point of our own against which the Japanese would have to beat themselves if they wished to avoid the severe drain which would be imposed on their shipping by our air action from Sumatra".

No detailed staff study of the operation had been made yet, and the Combined Chiefs of Staff were opposed. The British Chiefs of Staff said a whole front could not be supplied from the air, but an attack on northern Sumatra or Malaya leading to the capture of Singapore might be carried out in spring 1945. The matter was allowed to lapse.

It was revived in February 1944, when a delegation from Admiral Mountbatten, the Supreme Commander of the South East Asia Command, reported to the Defence Committee in London. Mountbatten proposed amphibious operations in cooperation with the American South West Pacific Area. "Culverin" would be a necessary first part of the plan. However, Mountbatten and the British Chiefs of Staff saw three objections to "Culverin" (or "Vanguard", a plan to capture Rangoon from the sea): "Culverin" might not have the effect that Churchill hoped since the Japanese in Burma could not be bypassed and would still be a threat. The CIGS said that only "Vanguard" could kill "Champion" (a plan to advance into central Burma from the north). "Vanguard" was a complement to preliminary operations further north. Also, a decision had to be made by 1 September.

The American Joint Chiefs of Staff did not favour "Culverin", partly because Mountbatten's Deputy Supreme Commander, the American General Joseph Stilwell, had sent a separate mission to Washington, DC, to represent his own differing views to the Joint Chiefs of Staff.

In the event, most of the Imperial Japanese Navy's battleships and cruisers were transferred to Singapore at about the same time. As amphibious operations depended on local naval superiority, "Culverin" had to be abandoned. The Royal Navy could not reinforce its fleet in the Indian Ocean with sufficient strength to face the Japanese main battle fleet, and the US Navy was committed to operations in the Central Pacific and South West Pacific and unwilling to divert their fleets from the Pacific.

The South East Asia Command was far more cautious in its estimates for resources required for successful amphibious operations than Churchill. For the much less ambitious Operation Buccaneer, the proposed capture of the Andaman Islands, they proposed a land force of 50,000 men, but Churchill had assumed that only a single division (14,000 men) would be necessary. Also, since no land-based air support would be available until a very large beachhead had been secured, Mountbatten demanded the use of almost every aircraft carrier possessed by the Royal Navy, which would have had adverse effects on other operations.

In mid-1945, the matter was finally dropped. The Japanese fleet had been destroyed or immobilised, but the preferred plan was Operation Zipper, a landing on the coast of Malaya. The final major landing in the area was the May 1945 assault on Rangoon, Operation Dracula.

== Sources ==
- Closing the Ring, Vol. 5 of Winston Churchill's memoirs of World War II.
- Jon Latimer, Burma: The Forgotten War, London: John Murray, 2004 ISBN 0-7195-6576-6
- Alanbrooke, Field Marshal Lord (2001). War Diaries 1939–1945. Phoenix Press. ISBN 1-84212-526-5.
- Ehrman, John (1956). Grand Strategy Volume V; August 1943 – September 1944. London: Her Majesty’s Stationery Office.
