= 1942 Arakan massacres =

Part of the Japanese invasion of Burma during World War II

Arakan massacres in 1942
- Part of the Burma Campaign in the South-East Asian theatre of World War II
- Location: Arakan, Burma (present-day Rakhine State, Myanmar)
- Date: 1942
- Target: people in Arakan State
- Deaths: 60,000
- Perpetrators: People in Arakan State; Imperial Japanese Armed Forces

During World War II, Japanese forces invaded Burma (now Myanmar), which was then under British colonial rule. The British forces retreated and, in the power vacuum left behind, considerable violence erupted between pro-Japanese Buddhist Rakhine and pro-British Muslim villagers. As part of the 'stay-behind' strategy to impede the Japanese advance, the Commander-in-Chief of forces in Delhi, Wavell, established "V-Force", which armed Rohingya locals in northern Arakan to create a buffer zone from Japanese invasion when they retreated.

The period also witnessed violence between groups loyal to the British and Burmese nationalists.

== Inter communal violence ==
Tensions boiling in Arakan before the war erupted during the Japanese invasion of Southeast Asia, and Arakan became the frontline in the conflict. The war resulted in a complete breakdown of civil administration and consequent development of habits of lawlessness exacerbated by the availability of modern arms. The Japanese advance triggered an inter-communal conflict between Muslims and Buddhists. The Muslims fled towards British-controlled, Muslim-dominated northern Arakan from Japanese-controlled Buddhist-majority areas, which stimulated a genocide of Rakhine Buddhists in British-controlled areas, particularly around Maungdaw. The failure of a British counter-offensive, attempted from December 1942 to April 1943, resulted in the abandonment of even more of the Muslim population as well as an increase in inter-communal violence.

Moshe Yegar, a research fellow at Truman Institute, Hebrew University of Jerusalem, noted that hostility had developed between the Muslims and the Buddhists who had brought about a similar hostility in other parts of Burma. This tension was let loose with the retreat of the British. With the approach of the Japanese into Arakan, the Buddhists instigated cruel measures against the Muslims. Thousands, though the exact number is unknown, fled from Buddhist-majority regions to eastern Bengal and northern Arakan, with many being killed or dying of starvation. The Muslims in response conducted retaliatory raids from British-controlled areas, massacring scores of Buddhists and causing many Buddhists to flee to southern Arakan.

Aye Chan, a historian at Kanda University in Japan, has written that, as a consequence of acquiring arms from the Allies during World War II, Rohingyas tried to destroy the collaborationist Arakanese villages instead of resisting the Japanese. Chan agrees that hundreds of Muslims fled to northern Arakan but states that the accounts of atrocities on them were exaggerated. The British Army's liaison officer Anthony Irwin, in contrast, praised the role of the V Force.

Muslims from Northern Rakhine State tortured, raped, and killed more than 20,000 Arakanese, including the Deputy Commissioner U Oo Kyaw Khaing. In return the Buddhist also killed a large number of Rohingya Muslims. The total casualty count of both parties in that conflict is not certain and no concrete official reference can be found.

== Persecution by the Japanese forces ==
Imperial Japanese forces slaughtered, raped, and tortured Rohingya Muslims and Indian Muslims. They expelled tens of thousands of Rohingya into Bengal in British India. The Japanese committed countless acts of rape, murder and torture against thousands of Rohingyas. During this period, some 22,000 Rohingyas are believed to have crossed the border into Bengal, then part of British India, to escape the violence. Defeated, 40,000 Rohingyas eventually fled to Chittagong after repeated massacres by the Burmese and Japanese forces.

A British report stated that after massacres "the area then occupied by us was almost entirely Mussulman Country".

== See also ==
- List of massacres in Myanmar
- 1971 Bangladesh atrocities
