= Lushai Brigade =

The Lushai Brigade was an improvised fighting formation of the British Indian Army which was formed during World War II. It participated in the Battle of Imphal and the Burma Campaign.

== History ==
In March 1944, the Imperial Japanese Army invaded India. As the available British and Indian forces were besieged in Imphal, there was a danger that Japanese units would infiltrate through the Lushai Hills, which were rugged and heavily forested, but not guarded other than by lightly armed levies and guerillas of V Force.

To guard against this threat, the commander of the British Fourteenth Army, Lieutenant General William Slim, formed four independent Indian infantry battalions into an ad hoc brigade, the Lushai Brigade. The commander was Brigadier P. C. Marindin. The brigade lacked artillery, engineers, transport, signals.

The Japanese did not try to cross the Lushai Hills, instead concentrating their force in this sector at Bishenpur, south of Imphal. Their lines of communications ran along a rough track from Tiddim. In July, Slim ordered the Lushai Brigade to interfere with these Japanese communications.

The brigade crossed the trackless hills on a wide front, during the worst of the monsoon rains. Its light equipment allowed it to cross terrain which heavier units would find impassable. Most of its transport consisted of locally enlisted porters. Two battalions laid ambushes along the road used by the Japanese. A third was able to occupy impregnable positions on one side of the Manipur River and shoot up all traffic which tried to use the road on the other side. The fourth battalion, with some home guard units (the Lushai and Chin Levies) and several hundred guerillas enlisted by V Force, reoccupied the Chin Hills, which had not been under British authority since 1942 when the Japanese had first moved onto the frontier between Burma and India.

As the monsoon ended, the brigade began moving south along the Gangaw Valley, to cover the right flank of Fourteenth Army. The Japanese Army withdrew south of the Irrawaddy River and the Gangaw Valley became Fourteenth Army's main axis of advance. The Lushai Brigade now led the advance and screened the presence of heavier units following up. The town of Gangaw, which was held by Japanese rearguards, was destroyed by heavy bombers before being occupied by the Brigade.

After this, the brigade was withdrawn for rest in India. It later moved to Burma.

== Order of battle ==
- 1st Bn. 9th Jat Regiment
- 8th Bn. 13th Frontier Force Rifles
- 7th Bn. 14th Punjab Regiment
- 1st Bn. Bihar Regiment
- Lushai and Chin Levies (attached)
- Falam Hills Battalion (attached)
- Lushai Detachment, V Force (attached)

== See also ==
- List of Indian Army Brigades in World War II

== Sources ==
- Jon Latimer, Burma: The Forgotten War, London: John Murray, 2004 ISBN 0-7195-6576-6
- William Slim, Defeat into Victory, London: Cassell, 1955
