= XV Corps (British India) =

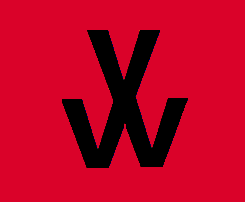
- Ensign XV Corps (British_India)
- Active: 1942–1946
- Country: (British Raj) British India
- Allegiance: British Empire
- Branch: British Indian Army
- Size: Corps

Commanders
- Notable commanders: Noel Beresford-Peirse; William Slim; Philip Christison

The XV Corps was a corps-sized formation of the British Indian Army, which was formed in India during the Second World War. It took part in the Burma Campaign and was disbanded after the end of the war. While part of the British Indian Army, it included other commonwealth units, namely the 22nd and 28th East African Brigades.

== Second World War ==
When Japan entered the war and drove British, Indian and Chinese forces from Burma in early 1942, XV Corps was formed from the Assam and Bengal Presidency District HQ on 30 March 1942, to defend Bengal, under the command of Eastern Army, which in turn was controlled by GHQ India. The Corps badge was an arrangement of three "V"s (signifying fifteen in Roman numerals) in black on a red background. Its first commander was Lieutenant General Noel Beresford-Peirse.

On 9 June, Beresford-Peirse was appointed to command India's Southern Command (an army-level administrative HQ) and Lieutenant General William Slim, former commander of the disbanded Burma Corps, took over XV Corps. At this point, XV Corps HQ was at Barrackpur near Calcutta. The Corps had the multiple roles of defending Bengal and Orissa from Japanese invasion, maintaining internal security over a wide area of eastern India and training its raw units. In July, Eastern Army took over direct control of operations in the Burmese coastal province of Arakan (a move which in hindsight proved to be unwise), and XV Corps HQ was transferred to Ranchi in Bihar, with a training and internal security role.

On 5 April 1943, XV Corps was hastily summoned to Chittagong to resume control of operations in Arakan, where a Japanese counter-attack had driven back the British and Indian troops. It proved too late to restore the situation with the exhausted troops, and the Corps fell back to the Indian frontier before the monsoon halted operations.

On October 15, Slim was promoted to command Eastern Army (which subsequently became British Fourteenth Army). His replacement was Lieutenant-General Sir Philip Christison. Under Fourteenth Army, XV Corps resumed the advance in Arakan towards the end of the year. In the early months of 1944, the Corps gained the first significant success against the Japanese in the South East Asia, when they defeated a Japanese offensive in an engagement which came to be known as the Battle of the Admin Box. After capturing the defended area of the Mayu Range, operations in the Arakan were curtailed to allow resources to be concentrated on the central front in Assam.

Fourteenth Army subsequently concentrated on the advance into Central Burma. XV Corps was removed from Fourteenth Army and directly subordinated to Allied Land Forces South East Asia so that the Corps could conduct an independent campaign through Arakan and down the coast of Burma. When the general offensive began in late 1944, XV Corps captured Akyab Island (with a vital airfield), launched amphibious flanking moves to intercept and defeat the retreating Japanese troops, and subsequently captured the Burmese port of Taungup and the islands of Ramree and Cheduba.

Finally, units of the Corps mounted Operation Dracula, an amphibious assault on Rangoon, the Burmese capital. Rangoon was found to have been abandoned by the Japanese.

Following the capture of Rangoon, XV Corps was again subordinated to Fourteenth Army and was withdrawn from Burma to prepare for Operation Zipper, an amphibious assault to recapture Malaya. However, the operation was overtaken by the Japanese surrender, and XV Corps was disbanded on 1 October 1945. Its headquarters was redesignated HQ Netherlands East Indies Command. The Netherlands East Indies Command went on to conduct operations in Java, including the Battle of Surabaya.
