= GHQ India =

Headquarters of the British Indian Army

- Formation sign of General Headquarters, India during the Second World War
- Active: 1903 to 1947
- Country: British India
- Part of: War Office; Viceroy of India
- Garrison/HQ: New Delhi

General Headquarters, India was the headquarters of the Commander-in-Chief, India, who commanded the British military forces in India, including the British Indian Army, after the Kitchener Reforms of 1903. It succeeded Headquarters, India which was the term in use initially after the three Presidency armies had been amalgamated into one force. The Commander-in-Chief answered to the civilian Viceroy of India.

Confusingly, in the official Volume II: India's Most Dangerous Hour, Major-General Stanley Kirby et al., 1958, the term "India Command" was repeatedly used. "India Command" was not defined, but Stanley Kirby et al. appeared to be referring to the British Indian Army in India; the British Army in India; and GHQ India, the three together, as a whole. A more correct term for these three entities together would have been the Army in India.

== Early history ==
GHQ India succeeded Headquarters, India which was the term in use initially after the three Presidency armies had been amalgamated into one force in 1895. "The C-in-C India’s HQ was known as the General Headquarters (GHQ India) and acted as the superior HQ for all services to fulfil their requirements."

The Commander-in-Chief's chief of staff was the Chief of the General Staff. It was based in Calcutta and Simla (the winter capital of the Raj) until the seat of power moved to New Delhi in 1911. In addition to India, as the [British] Indian Army garrisoned the waystation Aden Settlement (later Aden Colony) the Commander-in-Chief was also responsible for troops in Aden. Later Indian troops were also sent to Iraq and Persia).

The 1906 Birthday Honours and 1922 Birthday Honours list officers on the staff of Headquarters, India; by the 1942 New Year Honours the listing had become General Headquarters, India (Colonel, Acting Major-General Rob Lockhart).

For significant periods before the creation of South East Asia Command (SEAC) in 1943, the C-in-C India was also responsible for Ceylon and Burma. The Commander-in-Chief, India, had some 2,000 officers and 2.5 million troops under his command in 1945. GHQ India was redesignated Army HQ in 1947 when India was partitioned.

== Second World War ==
Following a review by the British Chiefs of Staff in late 1939, operational control of troops in Iraq passed in early 1940 to Middle East Command although the provision of troops and their maintenance remained for the most part GHQ India's responsibility. In March 1941, in the period before the Anglo-Iraqi War, the C-in-C Middle East General Archibald Wavell, who was preoccupied with existing problems in his theatre, gained approval for Iraq to come under India's operational control again but once hostilities commenced in May Wavell was obliged by London reluctantly to reassume responsibility. In June 1941, after cessation of hostilities, control reverted once more to GHQ India. India finally relinquished responsibility for Persia and Iraq in August 1942 when a separate Persia and Iraq Command was created.

After the dissolution of ABDACOM in February 1942 the C-in-C India also became responsible for Ceylon. During this period, some Chinese and American units also came under C-in-C India. These responsibilities remained unchanged until the creation of South East Asia Command (SEAC) in August 1943. With the creation of SEAC there were three geographic theatres and a further operational command. The China Theatre was under the command of Generalissimo Chiang Kai-shek. SEAC was an Anglo-American command under a Supreme Allied Commander, Lord Mountbatten, who was responsible for operations in Burma, Ceylon, Malaya and Sumatra. General Auchinleck as Commander-in-Chief, India, was responsible for the development of India as a base, for internal security in India, and the defence of India's North West Frontier. His responsibility included the training, equipping, maintenance and movement of operational forces assigned to SEAC. The American operational theater, China Burma India (CBI), operated in all three geographic areas. It was not subordinate to SEAC.

On 24 November 1944, G.H.Q.(I) passed on to the Headquarters Allied Land Forces South East Asia "..proposals made by the Burma Government-in-exile for the evaluation of the men released in 1942, either returnees or deserters." "The Burma Government proposed to raise administrative units to screen personnel who had remained in Burma, and operational units for internal security duties. ..Within General Headquarters, India, the department responsible for the administration of Burma Army units in India and Burma, known as Burma Section, also asked for the immediate raising of a second administrative unit." A.G. (BURSEC) was an integral part of GHQ India until it was established with Headquarters Twelfth Army.

Field Marshal Sir Claude Auchinleck served as the last C-in-C, India from 1943. He was reappointed on 15 August 1947, and became Supreme Commander of India and Pakistan. He oversaw the division of the Indian Army, Navy, and Air Force between the two new countries. In the process, GHQ Pakistan was established to serve the newly independent Pakistan, at Rawalpindi. Auchinleck served in this capacity until November 1948, when the role of Supreme Commander was abolished.
