= South East Asia Command =

WWII commanding body of Allied forces in Southeast Asia

- Founded: 1943
- Disbanded: 1946
- Country: United Kingdom
- Part of: Asiatic-Pacific Theater
- Garrison/HQ: Kandy, Ceylon
- Nickname: SEAC
- Engagements: Pacific War

Commanders
- Notable commanders: Lord Mountbatten; Montagu Stopford

Insignia
- Insignia

- Flag

South East Asia Command (SEAC) was the body set up to be in overall charge of Allied operations in the South-East Asian Theatre during the Second World War. The Supreme Allied Commander South East Asia (SACSEA) was the title given to the commander of South East Asia Command.

== History ==
=== Organisation ===
The initial supreme commander of the theatre was General Sir Archibald Wavell while head of the short-lived American-British-Dutch-Australian Command (ABDACOM) which was dissolved after the fall of Singapore and the Dutch East Indies. On 30 March 1942 the Joint Chiefs of Staff issued instructions naming General Douglas MacArthur as Supreme Allied Commander of the South West Pacific Area, which was made responsible for the water areas of the South China Sea, Borneo, and Java.

In August 1943, the Allies created the combined South East Asian Command, to assume overall command of air, sea and land operations in the theatre. In August 1943, with the agreement of the Combined Chiefs of Staff, Winston Churchill appointed Admiral Lord Louis Mountbatten as Supreme Allied Commander South East Asia (SACSEA). US Army General Joseph Stilwell was appointed deputy supreme commander. Stilwell was also, officially, chief of staff to Chiang Kai Shek, as Allied commander in China, and commanded all US forces across both theatres (which were known in the US as the China Burma India (CBI) Theater). Meanwhile the British Army commander in India, Claude Auchinleck as Commander-in-Chief, India, provided vital logistical support.

Mountbatten arrived in India on 7 October and SEAC came formally into being in Delhi at midnight on 15/16 November.

SEAC headquarters moved in April 1944 to Kandy in Ceylon.

=== General strategy ===
From the outset, Western Allied forces available for the wider war against Japan were limited – by an overall Allied commitment towards defeating Nazi Germany, before the Empire of Japan. This was especially the case for the UK, and major advances were not anticipated in Asia until mid-late 1944 at least – that is, not until the defeat of Germany had become inevitable.

A strategic focus by the Western Allies on the Central Pacific (i.e. the "Pacific Ocean Areas" in contemporaneous Allied terminology) and the South-West Pacific, resulted from compromises reached at the Casablanca Conference. UK participants were focused on Nazi Germany, and saw the war against Japan being limited "to the defense of a fixed line in front of those positions that must be held". However, because such an approach was unacceptable to the United States, it was agreed that there would be offensive actions in Burma, operations in support of China, and other activity beyond holding a defensive line in South East Asia, as a result of US demands that the Japanese be kept off-balance, throughout any areas in which they might encounter Allied forces. Nevertheless, for the Western Allies, the South East Asia theatre, China, and the North Pacific (including Alaska), were destined to become secondary theatres, relative to efforts in the Pacific Ocean Areas, in which the Commander-in-Chief of the US Pacific Fleet was US Fleet Admiral Chester Nimitz. Some saw SEAC as an organization for recapturing colonial possessions. The British also sometimes appeared to be more interested in liberating their own Asian possessions than the Americans did. This led Washington to try to distance itself from SEAC politically.

On 2 December 1943, the Combined Chiefs of Staff officially approved in principle a plan designating the Pacific Ocean Areas as the focus of the main effort against Japan. Their reasoning was that advances in the Central Pacific were the most rapid route towards sustained, direct attacks on the Japanese Home Islands – e.g. subjecting Tokyo and other major cities to attacks by strategic bombers. A secondary line of advance – by US and Australian forces – "along the New Guinea-N.E.I.-Philippine axis", was to be controlled by the separate South West Pacific Area command under Douglas MacArthur (US Army).

== Description ==
The operational area for SEAC was India, Burma, Ceylon, Malaya, northern islands of Sumatra, Siam (Thailand), Dutch East Indies and southern part of French Indochina.

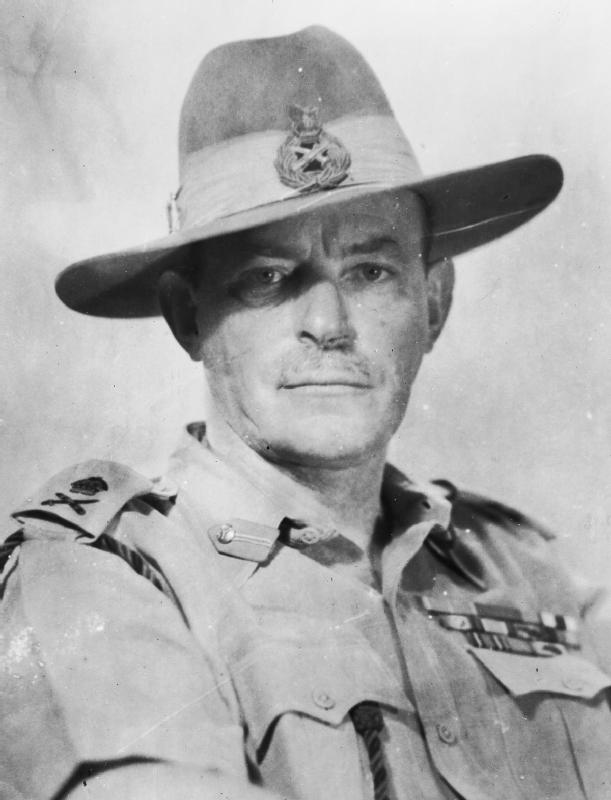
Lieutenant-General Montagu Stopford, the second and final commander of SEAC, who commanded June–November 1946.

1945 South East Asia Command issued pass.

Command arrangements in SEAC were always complicated. Ideally there should have been under the Supreme Commander a Commander in Chief for each of the land sea and air forces. This was implemented for the naval and air forces (including the establishment of Air Command, South East Asia) but the British 11th Army Group, under SEAC itself, controlled only British land forces. US and Chinese forces serving in the South East Asian theatre, organised as the Northern Combat Area Command or NCAC commanded by Stilwell, answered directly to the Supreme Commander because Stilwell refused to serve under the 11th Army Group commander George Giffard. The Eleventh Army Group had the Fourteenth Army on the Burma front, and the British garrison in Ceylon under its direct command. Stilwell also served as Chief of Staff to Chiang Kai-shek, who was officially the Supreme Allied Commander in China. Air Chief Marshal Sir Richard Peirse was appointed the Air Commander in Chief under Mountbatten. Air units taking part in the Burma Campaign were, at first, part of either the RAF Third Tactical Air Force or the USAAF Tenth Air Force. Tenth Air Force came under SEAC only through Stilwell as commanding General CBI Theater. To avoid a potentially cumbersome chain of command and overlapping effort Mountbatten gave orders in December for the two air forces to be integrated under the name Eastern Air Command. The US Fourteenth Air Force, which was based in China and the US Twentieth Air Force – strategic bomber units based in India – were never controlled by SEAC but their operations were coordinated with SEAC. At sea, the command structure was relatively simple, since the Royal Navy was providing almost all naval forces in the area. Admiral Sir James Somerville, Commander-in-Chief, Eastern Fleet, became the naval commander under Mountbatten.

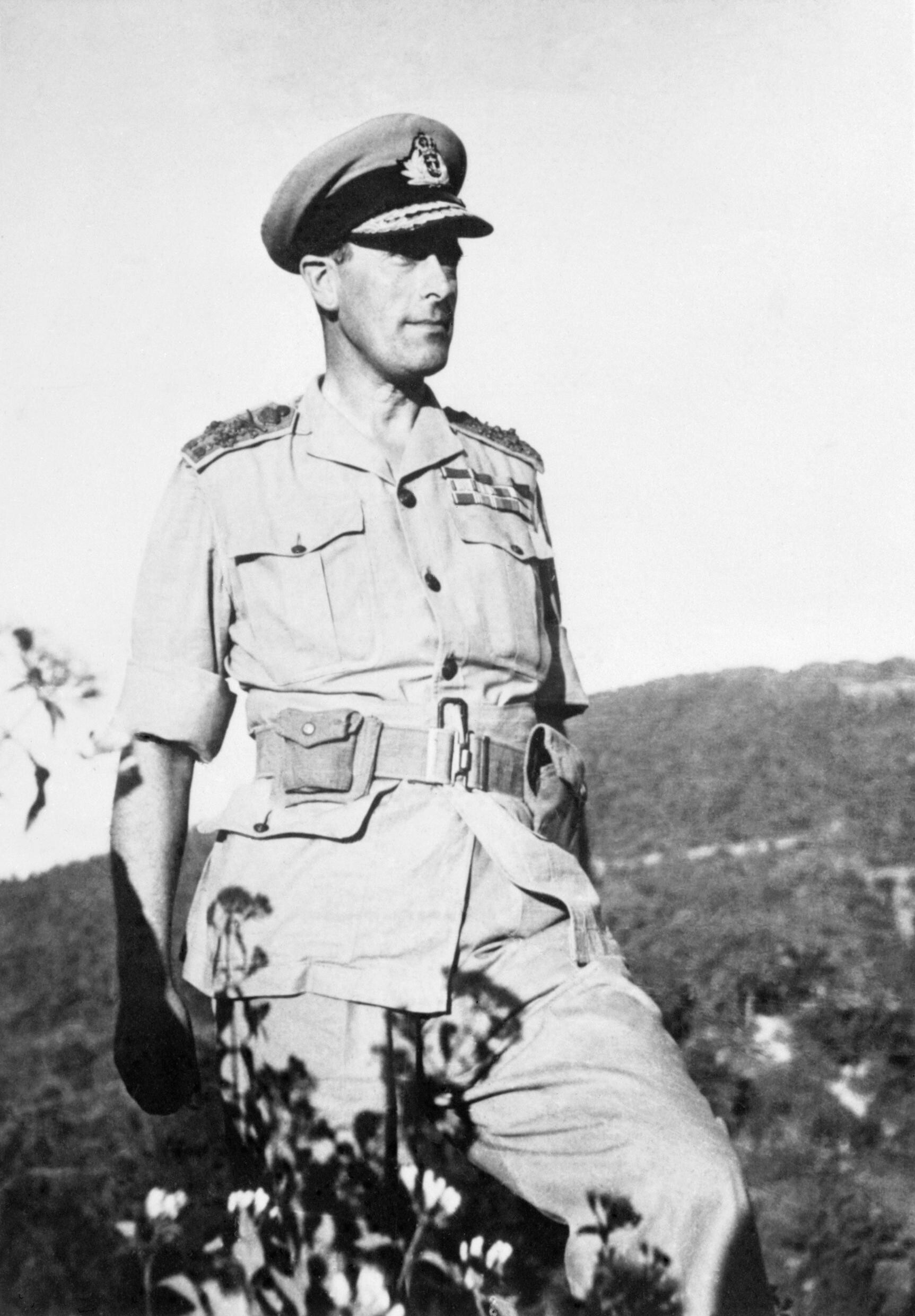
Lord Louis Mountbatten Supreme Allied Commander of the South East Asia Command from October 1943 through the disbandment of SEAC in 1946. This photograph, taken in February 1944, is from his tour of the Arakan front, as part of the Burma Campaign.

It was not until late 1944 that the land forces chain of command was clarified, after Stilwell was recalled to Washington. His overall role, and the CBI command were then split among three people: Lt Gen. Raymond Wheeler became Deputy Supreme Allied Commander South East Asia; Maj. Gen. Albert Wedemeyer became Chief of Staff to Chiang, and commander of US Forces, China Theater (USFCT). Lt Gen. Daniel Sultan was promoted, from deputy commander of CBI to commander of US Forces, India-Burma Theater (USFIBT) and commander of the NCAC. The 11th Army Group was redesignated Allied Land Forces South East Asia (ALFSEA) under a new commander Lieutenant-General Oliver Leese who had relinquished command of the Eighth Army in Italy, and NCAC (which by this time included Chinese, American and British units) was placed under ALFSEA. As the drive to liberate Burma began in earnest however, Chiang Kai-shek and Wedemeyer made increasing demands for NCAC's formations to be moved to the China Theatre to meet the threat of Japanese attacks from the north. Once the Burma Road from Mandalay to Chungking was secured NCAC became passive and in March 1945 Mountbatten agreed to the US and Chinese troops in NCAC being gradually withdrawn to the China.

RAF aircraft destined for SEAC had the word "SNAKE" applied after the serial during ferrying to prevent them being appropriated by other commands along the route.

In February 1945, Air Marshal Keith Park was appointed Allied Air Commander of South-East Asia Command (SEAC) where he served until the end of the war.

Once most of Burma was re-captured by Fourteenth Army on 2nd May 1945, the command turned its attention towards its next major operational objective: Malaya. However, the use of atomic bombs on the Japanese mainland brought the war to an abrupt end.

== Post–war ==
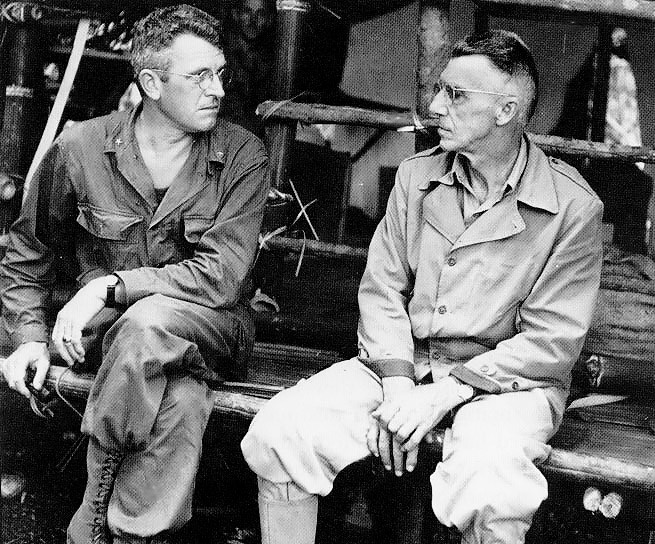
General Joseph Stilwell (right), First Deputy Supreme Allied Commander of the South East Asia Command, together with General Frank Merrill, in Burma during the Burma Campaign.

The borders of SEAC were adjusted in the aftermath of the war, and its emphasis shifted from combat operations to military government. French Indochina was added, along with Borneo – most of which had already been captured by Australian forces, under the South West Pacific Command – and Java. The command became responsible for over 128 million people, with at least 120,000 of them still under Japanese custody. This added immensely to its problems. At the same time, Western governments expected SEAC to re-establish colonial regimes in territories lost to Japan in 1941–45 where nationalist, anti-colonial forces had gained strength.

After Japan's surrender, Lt. General Itagaki Seishiro, who commanded the Japanese Seventh Area Army in Southeast Asia, were sent to Tokyo to stand trial for war crime. The British soon put these captives to work filling bomb craters, cleaning toilets, and cutting grass. They marched to their work sites each morning and back to their prisons at night. There were bouts of violence targeting former Japanese soldiers, but there were also offers of help to those Japanese civilians that were still waiting to be repatriated.

Food shortages were everywhere. Migrations to urban areas, where rations were rumored to be more available, worsened the situation. The British tried to bring in as much food as they could, but the system of rationing soon broke down. Prices soared, and a black market for rice flourished. Rising inflation was made worse after the British demonetized the Japanese occupation currency. A wave of strikes swept Singapore, led by Communist leaning labour unions and hundreds of thousands their members.

British Commonwealth troops were landed in the Dutch East Indies (Indonesia) and French Indochina to facilitate the return of forces from the pre-war colonial powers. The formation deployed to the East Indies was the Indian XV Corps under command of Lieutenant General Sir Philip Christison, which included 5th Indian Infantry Division, 23rd Indian Infantry Division and 5th Parachute Brigade. Military government was soon established in Burma, Malaya, Singapore and British Borneo. Sarawak and Sumatra did not prove to be major headaches for the British, except that one Japanese unit in Borneo refused to surrender until October 29th 1945.

Thailand, although it had officially been an ally of Japan, quickly resumed both its independence and its ties with the western powers.

The commander of British forces declared de facto military government, to make it possible for French forces to return on 22nd September 1945.

=== Indonesian National Revolution, 1945–46 ===
Aided by armed militias formed by the Japanese during the occupation, Indonesian nationalists in Java declared the Dutch East Indies a republic, and independent from the Netherlands. The British intended that the Dutch colonial administration should return, and assisted a small military contingent, the Netherlands Indies Civil Administration (NICA). However the reality was that Indonesia declared independence on 17th August 1945.

British troops found themselves in increasing conflict with the nationalists. The nationalists attacked JSP garrisons awaiting repatriation, to seize their arms. A British Brigadier, A.W.S. Mallaby, was killed, as he pushed for the nationalists to surrender their weapons. As a result, on 10 November 1945, Surabaya was attacked by British forces, leading to the bloody Battle of Surabaya. The city was secured later that month. The battle for Surabaya was the bloodiest single engagement of the Indonesian National Revolution (1945–49). However, the British were reluctant to devote their scarce resources to a defence of Dutch interests, and withdrew from Indonesia.

== Disbandment ==
As 1946 drew on, under its second and final commander, Lieutenant-General Montagu Stopford (June to November 1946), SEAC discharged its final tasks and was disbanded.

== See also ==
- Radio SEAC
