= Fourteenth Army (United Kingdom) =

1943–1945 Commonwealth military formation

- 14th Army formation badge.
- Active: 1943–1945
- Country: United Kingdom; British India
- Branch: British Army; British Indian Army
- Type: Field army
- Size: nearly 1,000,000 men (late 1944)
- Nickname: The Forgotten Army
- Engagements: World War II: Burma campaign
- Battle honours: Burma

Commanders
- Notable commanders: Lieutenant-General William Slim

The British Fourteenth Army was a multi-national force comprising units from Commonwealth countries during the Second World War. It was composed of units of the British Army, many from the Indian Army, and significant contributions from the British Army's West and East African divisions. It was often referred to as the "Forgotten Army" because its operations in the Burma campaign were overlooked by the contemporary press, and remained more obscure than those of the corresponding formations in Europe for long after the war. For most of the Army's existence, it was commanded by Lieutenant-General William Slim.

== History ==
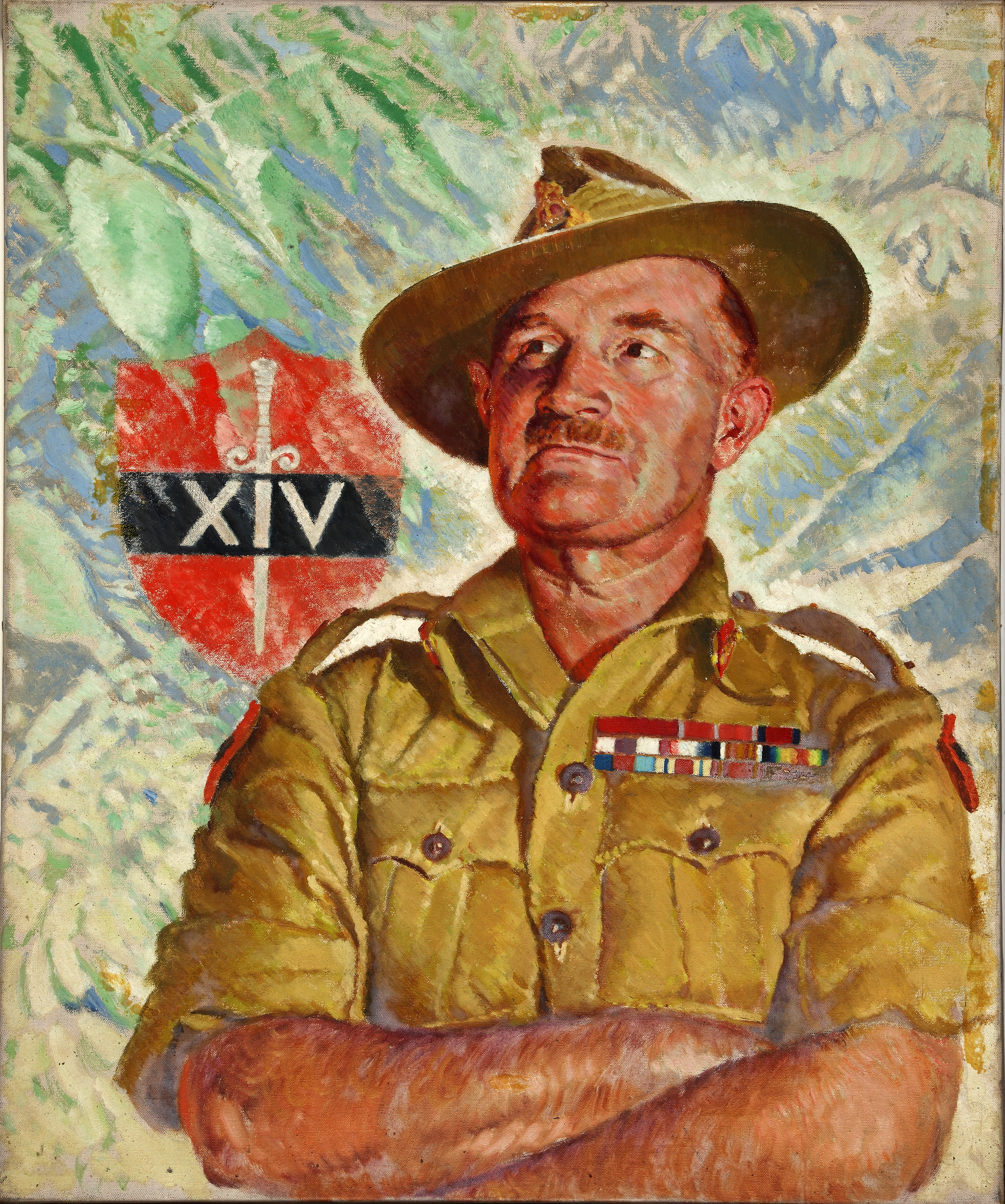
Portrait of William Slim, as commander of the Fourteenth Army, commissioned by the Ministry of Information.

=== Creation ===
Before World War II the British Indian Army had been divided into regional commands supervised by the headquarters in New Delhi, GHQ India. One of the commands was Eastern Command, commanded by Sir Charles Broad. On or about 21 April 1942, Eastern Command was reorganised as Eastern Army. It had both control of operations against the Japanese Army in Burma, and large rear-area responsibilities, stemming from its pre-war task. In July 1942, Broad retired and Lieutenant General Noel Irwin assumed command. The army HQ exchanged its location and role with that of XV corps for the Arakan campaign (1942–1943). After the failure of this offensive, Irwin was replaced by General George Giffard in May 1943.

In late 1943, South East Asia Command was created, with Lord Louis Mountbatten as Commander-in-Chief. Eastern Army was split. A reformed Eastern Command took over the rear areas of Bihar, Odisha and most of Bengal. Eastern Army remained responsible for operations against the Japanese, as part of British 11th Army Group (commanded by Giffard). Lieutenant General William Slim, then commanding XV Corps, was appointed to the command of the Army. At least two sources report the story of Mountbatten's first or one of his initial meetings with Slim, who reportedly told Mountbatten "..Let's change this ghastly name Eastern Army. Let's just get a number."

Fourteenth Army's principal subordinate formations were IV Corps in Assam and XV Corps in Arakan. During the early part of 1944, the Army also had loose operational control over the American and Chinese Northern Combat Area Command, and the Chindits operating behind enemy lines under Major General Orde Wingate.

Captain Yavar Abbas, an Indian former member of the 14th Army who had previously served in the 11th Sikh Regiment commented that the Sikh regiment was "a version of Dad's Army, in the company of white, middle-aged men as my fellow officers, who still considered India to be a crown colony on which they'll have continuing control for the foreseeable future", while the 14th Army felt completely different: "It was wonderful camaraderie. There were British and Indians mixing with each other."

=== Defending British India ===
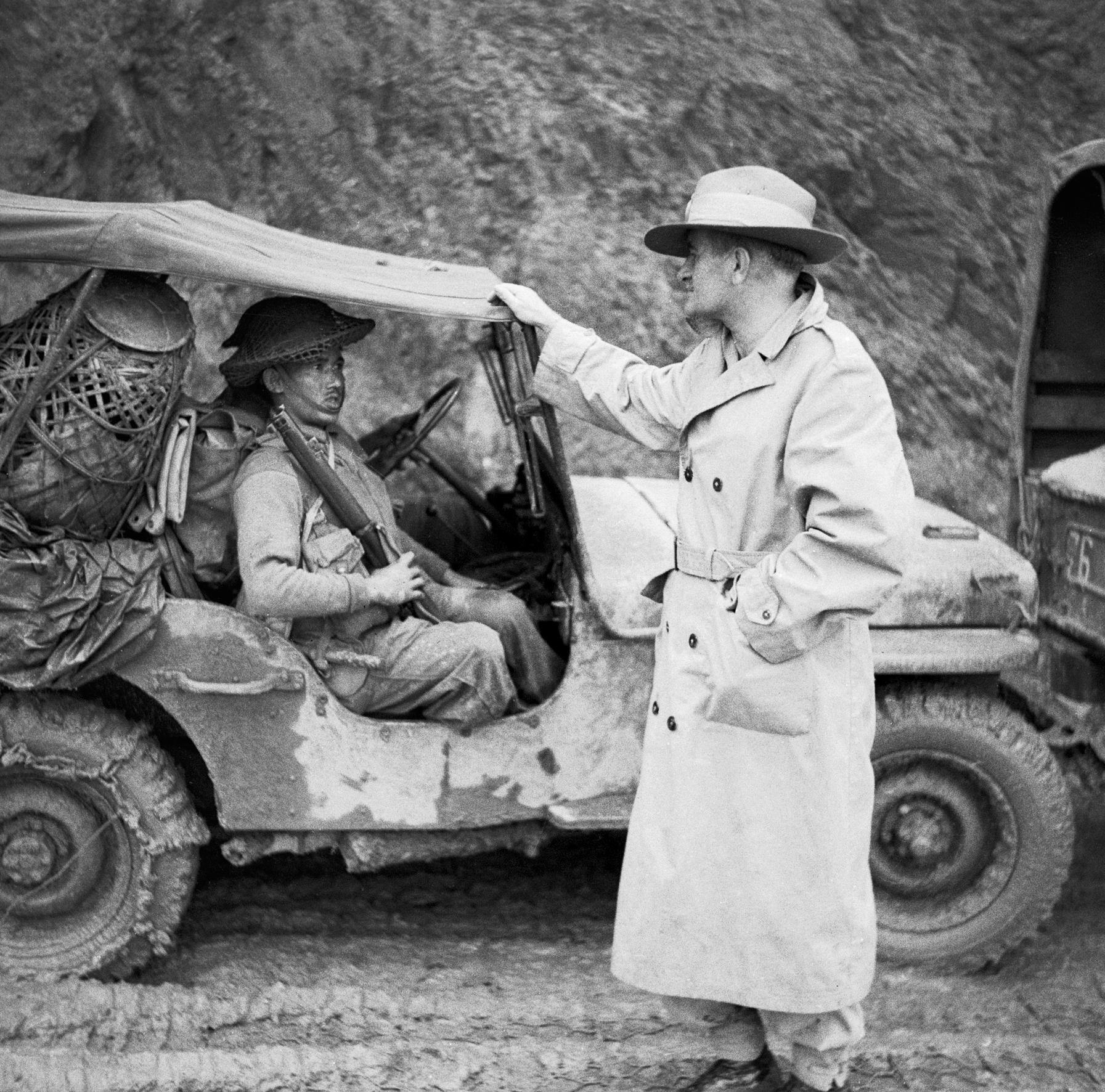
Lt.-Gen. Slim, commanding the Fourteenth Army, chatting to a Gurkha rifleman. Near Pallel, November 1944.

In early 1944, the Allies began tentative advances into Burma. The Japanese responded with all-out offensives, intending to destroy the Allies in their base areas.

The first Japanese move was a subsidiary attack in Arakan where XV Corps was advancing slowly south. After initial Allied setbacks, in which an Indian divisional HQ was overrun, the surrounded units defeated the Japanese at the Battle of the Admin Box. A vital factor was the resupply of cut-off units by aircraft.

The main Japanese offensive was launched on the central front in Assam. While a division advanced to Kohima to isolate IV Corps, the main body attempted to surround and destroy IV Corps at Imphal. Since the Japanese attack in Arakan had already failed, battle-hardened units were flown from Arakan to aid the besieged forces in Assam. Also, XXXIII Corps was moved from southern India, where they had been training for amphibious operations, to relieve the garrison at Kohima and then push on to relieve Imphal.

The result of the battles was a crushing Japanese defeat. The Japanese suffered 85,000 casualties, mainly from sickness and disease after their supplies ran out. The Allies had been continually supplied from the air, in the largest operation of its type to that date.

=== Retaking Burma ===
In 1945, amphibious operations to recapture Burma had to be cancelled once again because of a shortage of resources. Instead, Fourteenth Army was to mount the main offensive. The Army was now subordinated to the headquarters of Allied Land Forces, South East Asia (ALFSEA), and consisted of IV Corps and XXXIII Corps. Since the Army's supply lines by land were long and precarious, air supply was once again to be vital.

The Japanese attempted to forestall the Allied attacks by withdrawing behind the Irrawaddy River. Fourteenth Army was nevertheless able to change its axis of advance. IV Corps, spearheaded by armoured and motorised units, crossed the river downstream of the main Japanese forces and seized the vital logistic and communications centre of Meiktila. As the Japanese attempted to recapture Meiktila, XXXIII Corps captured Mandalay, the former capital which was of major significance to the majority Burman population. The result of the Battles of Meiktila and Mandalay, known as the Battle of Central Burma, was the destruction of most of the Japanese units in Burma, which allowed the subsequent pursuit.

Fourteenth Army now advanced south. While XXXIII Corps advanced down the Irrawaddy River, IV Corps made the main effort along the Sittang River, covering 200 miles (320 km) in a month. It was vital to capture Rangoon, the capital and principal port of Burma, to allow the Army to be supplied during the monsoon. In the event, IV Corps was held up 40 miles (64 km) north of Rangoon by sacrificial Japanese rearguards, but its advance caused the Japanese to abandon Rangoon, which was occupied after an unopposed amphibious landing (codenamed Operation Dracula) on 2 May.

The Fourteenth Army was supported by the Women's Auxiliary Service (Burma) who provided a canteen service for the troops of Burma Command and moved down through the country with the Army.

=== End of the War ===
Shortly after the fall of Rangoon, the Army headquarters was relieved of responsibility for operations in Burma. A new Twelfth Army headquarters was formed from XXXIII Corps HQ and took over IV Corps. Fourteenth Army HQ now moved to Ceylon to plan operations to recapture Malaya and Singapore. It controlled XV Corps and the newly raised Indian XXXIV Corps.

General Slim was promoted to command Allied Land Forces in South East Asia. Lieutenant-General Miles Dempsey was appointed to command Fourteenth Army.

A seaborne landing on the west coast of Malaya, codenamed Operation Zipper, was being prepared but was forestalled by the dropping of the atomic bombs on Hiroshima and Nagasaki and the Japanese surrender. Zipper was nevertheless mounted unopposed as the quickest method of introducing troops to Malaya to enforce the surrender of the Japanese there and repatriate Allied prisoners of war.

Fourteenth Army was renamed Malaya Command on 1 November 1945.

== Commonwealth Army ==
The Fourteenth Army, like the Eighth Army, was made up from units that came from all corners of the Commonwealth. In 1945 the Fourteenth Army was the largest army in the Commonwealth and one of the largest armies in the world, with about a million men under command. Three African divisions, the 81st and 82nd West African Divisions and 11th (East Africa) Division, were attached to the army. There were many units and formations from the British Army, but the majority of the army was built around the British Indian Army, which was stated to be the largest all-volunteer army in history with 2,500,000 men.

== Order of battle ==
The Fourteenth Army was the Second World War's largest Commonwealth Army, with nearly a million men by late 1944.

At different periods of the Second World War it was composed of four corps:

- IV Corps
- XV Corps
- XXXIII Corps
- XXXIV Corps

A total of thirteen divisions served with the Fourteenth Army:

- British 2nd Infantry Division
- Indian 5th Infantry Division
- Indian 7th Infantry Division
- 11th (East Africa) Infantry Division
- Indian 17th Infantry Division
- Indian 19th Infantry Division
- Indian 20th Infantry Division
- Indian 23rd Infantry Division
- Indian 25th Infantry Division
- Indian 26th Infantry Division
- British 36th Infantry Division
- 81st (West Africa) Infantry Division
- 82nd (West Africa) Infantry Division

Some smaller fighting formations also served:

- 50th Parachute Brigade (India)
- 77th Parachute Brigade (India)
- 14th Airlanding Brigade
- 268 Indian Motor Brigade
- 3rd Commando Brigade
- Lushai Brigade
- 22 Infantry Brigade (East Africa)
- 28 Infantry Brigade (East Africa)
- 254th Tank Brigade
- 255th Tank Brigade
- 50th Tank Brigade

Also serving with the 14th Army were a range of army, corps and divisional units not organic to the combat divisions.

== Legacy ==
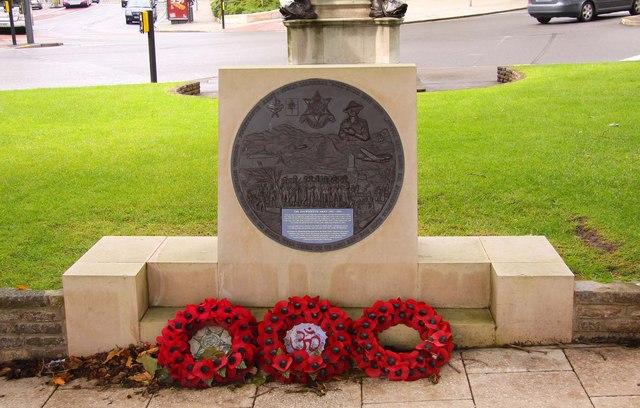
Fourteenth Army memorial in Bristol

When you go home don't worry about what to tell your loved ones and friends about service in Asia. No one will know where you were, or where it is if you do. You are, and will remain "The Forgotten Army".

— attributed to General Slim

The War Cemetery in Kohima has the famous inscription "When You Go Home, Tell Them Of Us And Say, For Your Tomorrow, We Gave Our Today". The Kohima Epitaph is attributed to John Maxwell Edmonds (1875–1958), and is thought to have been inspired by the epitaph of Simonides written by Simonides to honour the Spartans who fell at the Battle of Thermopylae in 480 BC.

== Documentaries ==
- Burma: The Forgotten War, BBC, 1995 (Director: Mark Fielder; Narrator: Charles Wheeler)
- Captain Tom's War, ITV, 2020 (Captain Tom Moore marks 75 years since VJ Day and the end of World War Two)
