= George Giffard =

British Army general (1886–1964)

General Sir George Giffard GCB DSO
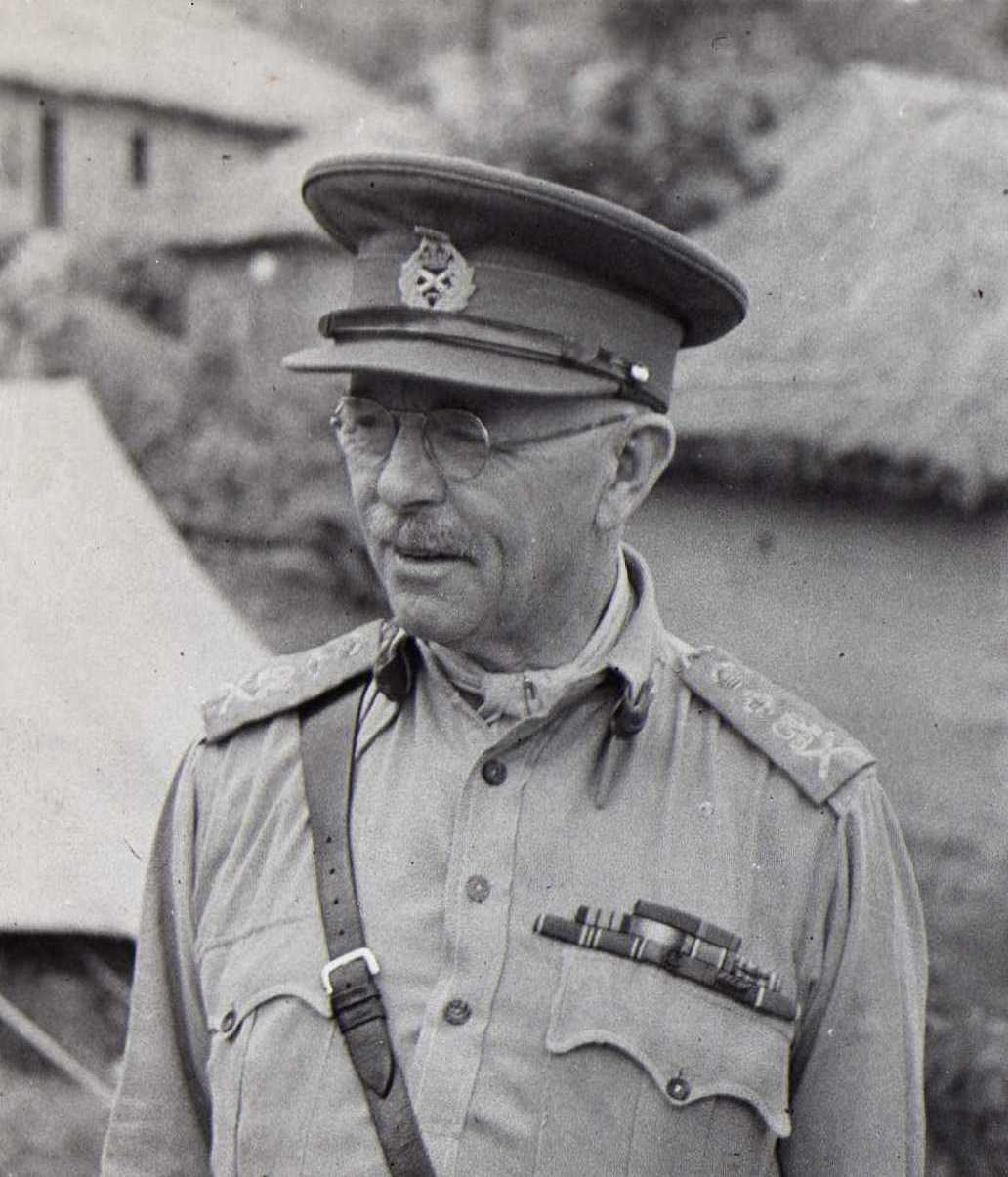
- General Sir George Giffard in India, c. 1943
- Born: 27 September 1886; Englefield Green, Surrey, England
- Died: 17 November 1964 (aged 78); Royal Hampshire County Hospital, Winchester, England
- Relatives: Susan Lawrence (aunt)
- Military career
- Allegiance: United Kingdom
- Branch: British Army
- Service years: 1905–1946
- Rank: General
- Service number: 3408
- Unit: Queen's (Royal West Surrey Regiment)
- Commands: 11th Army Group (1943–1944); Eastern Army, India (1943); West Africa Command (1940–1943); British Forces in Palestine and Trans-Jordan (1940); 2nd Battalion, Queen's Royal West Surrey Regiment (1932–1933)
- Conflicts: First World War; Second World War
- Awards: Knight Grand Cross of the Order of the Bath; Companion of the Distinguished Service Order; Mentioned in Despatches (4); Croix de Guerre (France); Order of Polonia Restituta (Poland)

General Sir George James Giffard, GCB, DSO (27 September 1886 – 17 November 1964) was a British military officer, who had a distinguished career in command of African troops in the First World War, rising to command an Army Group in South East Asia in the Second World War.

== Early career ==
Giffard was the eldest son of George Campbell Giffard, Clerk of the Journals, House of Commons, and Jane Lawrence, granddaughter of the judge Sir James Bacon. He was thus a nephew of the Socialist politician Susan Lawrence. After attending Rugby School and the Royal Military College, Sandhurst, he was commissioned into the Queen's Royal West Surrey Regiment in 1906. In 1913, while serving with its 1st Battalion, he saw action in East Africa. He transferred into a unit of the King's African Rifles.

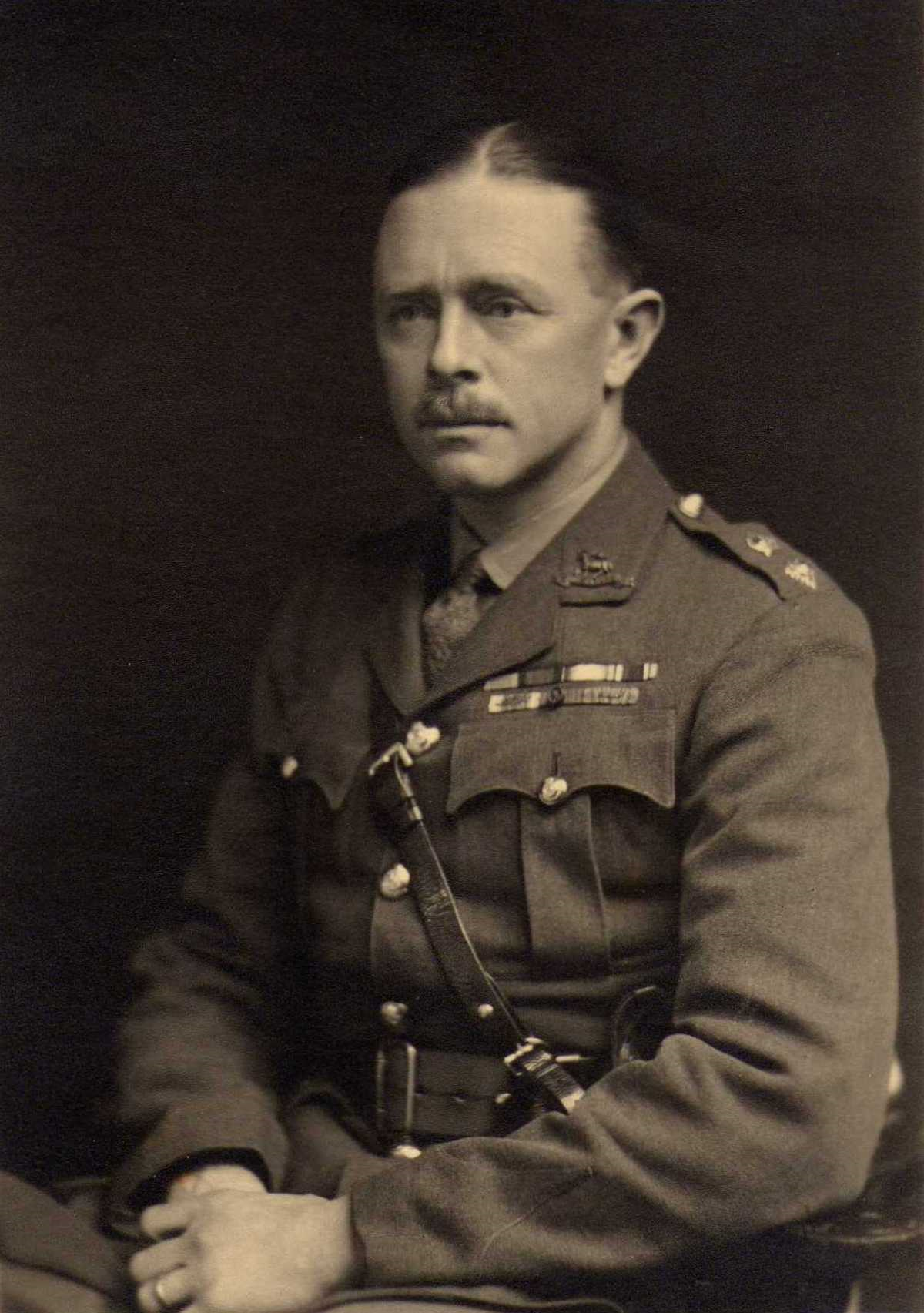
George Giffard as lieutenant colonel following the First World War.

Giffard saw active service in the First World War, his unit serving in the East Africa campaign against the German colonial forces (Schutztruppe) under Lettow-Vorbeck. He rose to command a column of two battalions of the KAR, "Gifcol". Highly respected and lauded by his own soldiers, an Australian scout under his command commented that Giffard was "an efficient and tireless soldier, [who] expected his officers and men to be the same". He was also wounded, was appointed a Companion of the Distinguished Service Order (DSO), and was mentioned in despatches four times. Although Lettow-Vorbeck's forces were never rounded up, Gifcol was nevertheless the most effective unit involved in the efforts to pursue and capture them, and came close to destroying the remaining Schutztruppe during the Battle of Lioma in 1918.

After the war, Giffard attended the Staff College, Camberley from 1919 to 1920. On graduating, he joined the Royal West African Frontier Force. In 1927 he participated in the Shanghai Expeditionary Force as the Second-in-Command of the 1st Battalion the Queen's Royal West Surrey Regiment. The following year, he was appointed an instructor at the Staff College, Camberley, and then in 1931 attended the Imperial Defence College, and later became commanding officer of the 2nd Battalion, Queen's Royal Surrey Regiment at Aldershot. In 1933 he became a general staff officer, Grade 1 (GSO1) (effectively the chief of staff) of the British 2nd Infantry Division.

Giffard returned to West Africa in 1936, when he was appointed inspector-general of the West African Frontier Force. He was appointed inspector-general of African Colonial Forces in 1938.

== Second World War ==
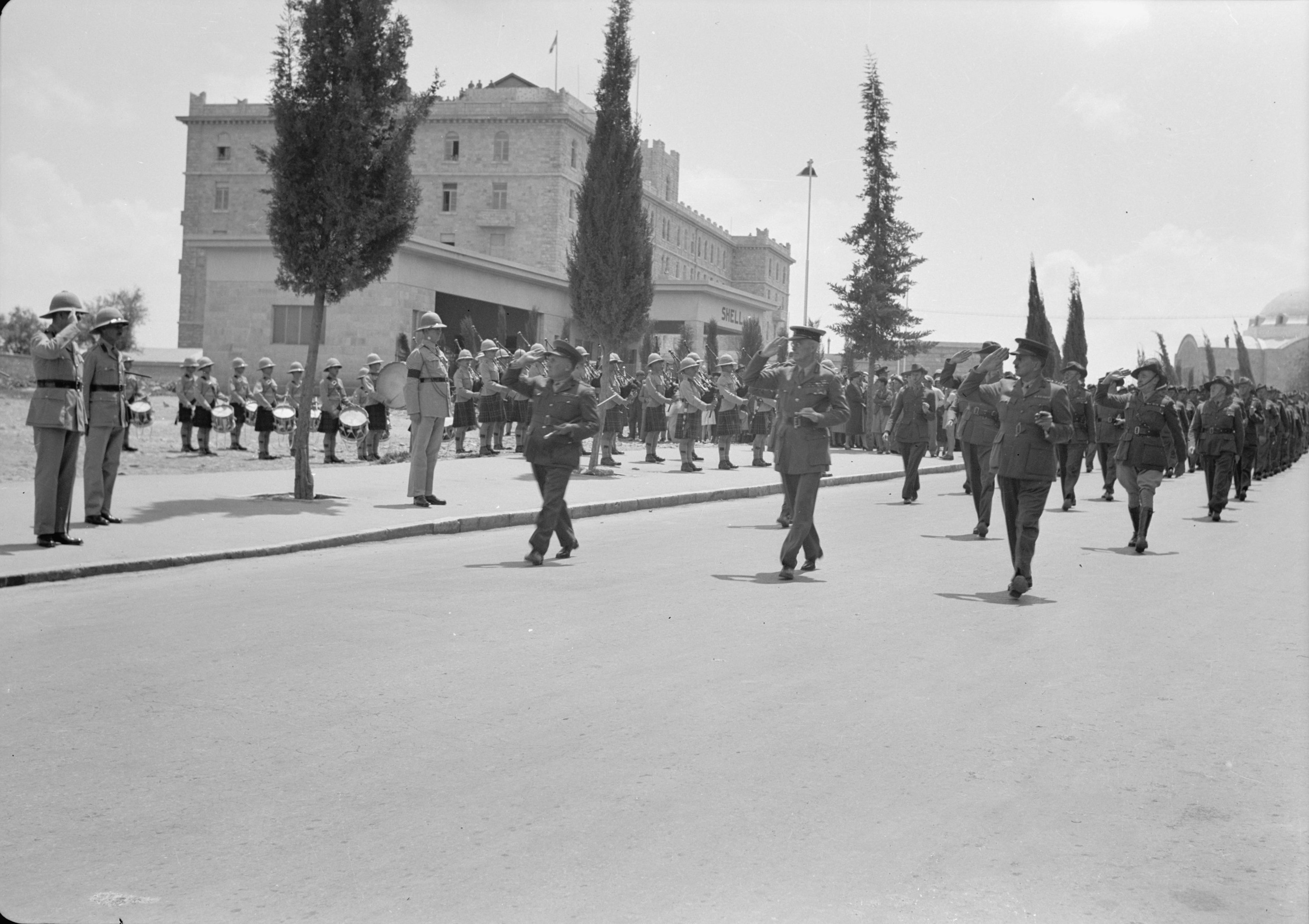
Anzac Day, Jerusalem, 25 April 1940. The march past the GOC, Lieutenant-General George Giffard, led by Generals Allen, Freyberg and Morris.

Giffard began the Second World War as military secretary at the War Office, and then, from 1940, was general officer commanding British Forces in Palestine and Trans-Jordan.

In 1941 he became commander-in-chief of the West Africa Command. While the Mediterranean was barred to British shipping by German and Italian naval and air force units, West Africa was an important link in Allied lines of communication to the Middle East and the Far East. In addition to organising the logistic infrastructure, Giffard's major achievement was the reorganisation of the units of the Royal West African Frontier Force into two field infantry divisions, capable of serving as independent forces in rough terrain. Initially, this was in response to a potential threat from Vichy French forces in Senegal and Niger. Later, these two divisions, 81st (West Africa) Division and 82nd (West Africa) Division served with distinction in the Burma Campaign.

He was made general officer commanding, Eastern Army, in India, in May 1943. This army faced the Japanese army which had occupied Burma. Several sources, notably Field Marshal William "Bill" Slim, testified to his contribution to the improvement in morale and effectiveness in Eastern Army during this period.

In October 1943 he was appointed commander in chief of 11th Army Group in India and Burma, effectively being commander in chief of land forces in the South East Asia Command. His period of command here was less happy. He was temperamentally the opposite of the publicity-hungry commander in chief, Admiral Louis Mountbatten, and the two men often clashed. He and the United States General Joseph Stilwell also disliked each other. Stilwell, as commander of the Northern Combat Area Command, refused to take Giffard's orders, claiming that he could not submit American forces to British control, and as deputy supreme commander to Mountbatten he was in any case Giffard's superior. The resulting command arrangement was an awkward compromise.

Giffard was appointed a Knight Grand Cross of the Order of the Bath in the 1944 New Year Honours. In March, relations between Mountbatten and Giffard broke during a crisis at the start of the Battle of Imphal. Mountbatten acted decisively to obtain transport aircraft from the United States Army Air Force to fly reinforcements and supplies to the isolated Allied troops at Imphal. Mountbatten's chief of staff, Lieutenant-General Henry Pownall, wrote that Giffard had shown no initiative at all. Giffard was notified of his dismissal in May, but was asked to remain in post until his successor, Lieutenant-General Oliver Leese, could relieve him. As a result, he remained until October.

== Other appointments ==
In 1945, Giffard was made Colonel of the Queen's Royal Regiment. He was also Colonel Commandant of the Royal West African Frontier Force and of the King's African Rifles. Giffard was also Aide-de-Camp General to the King from 1943 to 1946. He retired in 1946.

== Bibliography ==
- Allen, Louis (1984). Burma: the longest War 1941–45. J. M. Dent and Sons. ISBN 0-460-02474-4.
- McLynn, Frank (2011). The Burma Command. Vintage Books. ISBN 978-0-099-55178-2.
- Slim, William (1956). Defeat Into Victory. Cassell. ISBN 0-304-29114-5.
- Adams, Gregg (2016). King's African Rifles Soldier vs Schutztruppe Soldier. East Africa 1917–18. Oxford: Osprey Publishing. ISBN 978-1-4728-1327-5.
- Mead, Richard (2007). Churchill's Lions: a biographical guide to the key British generals of World War II. Stroud (UK): Spellmount. ISBN 978-1-86227-431-0.
- Smart, Nick (2005). Biographical Dictionary of British Generals of the Second World War. Barnsley, South Yorkshire: Pen and Sword Books. ISBN 1844150496.

Military offices
Preceded by Sir Douglas Brownrigg	Military Secretary; 1939–1940	Succeeded by Arthur Floyer-Acland
Preceded by Michael Barker	GOC British Forces in Palestine and Trans-Jordan; February–June 1940	Succeeded by Philip Neame
New command	GOC West Africa Command; 1940–1943	Succeeded by Francis Nosworthy
Preceded by Noel Irwin	GOC-in-C Eastern Army, India; May–October 1943	Succeeded by Sir Mosley Mayne
New command	GOC-in-C 11th Army Group; 1943–1944	Succeeded by Sir Oliver Leese (As GOC Allied Land Forces South East Asia)
Honorary titles
Preceded by Sir Ivo Vesey	Colonel of the 2nd (The Queen's Royal) Regiment of Foot; 1945–1954	Succeeded by John Whitfield
