= 7th Indian Infantry Division =

7th Infantry Division
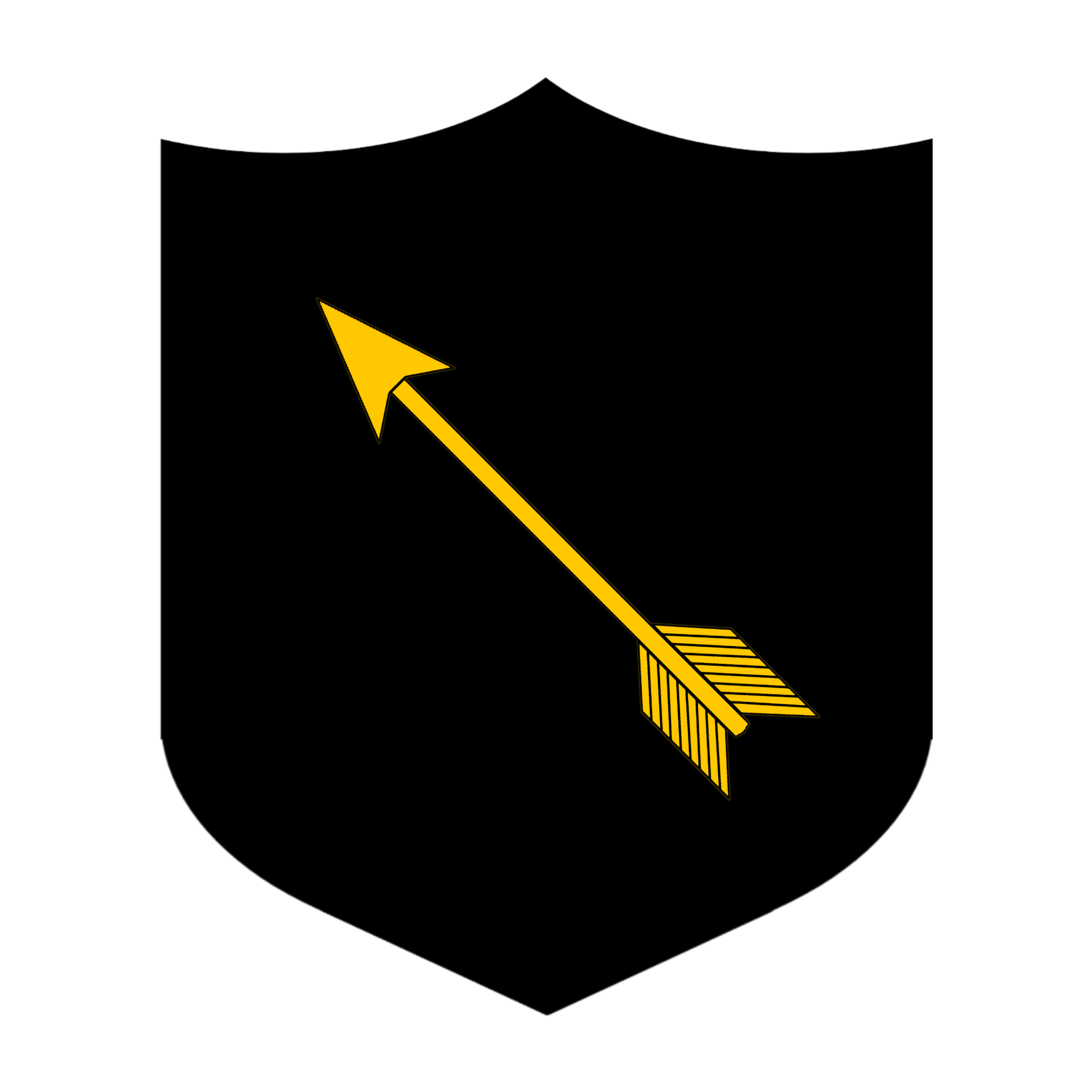
- Formation sign for the 7th Infantry Division.
- Active: 1940-present
- Type: Infantry
- Size: Division
- Garrison/HQ: Ferozepur
- Nickname(s): Golden Arrow Division
- Engagements: Battle of the Admin Box; Battle of Kohima; Battle of Central Burma; Irrawaddy River

Commanders
- Notable commanders: Frank Messervy; Geoffrey Charles Evans

The 7th Infantry Division is a war-formed infantry division, part of the British Indian Army that saw service in the Burma Campaign.

== History ==
The division was created on 1 October 1940 at Attock, under the command of Major General Arthur Wakely. Its formation sign was an arrow, pointing bottom left to top right, in yellow on a black background. The division was sometimes known as the "Golden Arrow" division from this sign. When first formed, the division consisted of the 13th, 14th and 16th Indian Infantry Brigades, but within eighteen months, both the 13th and 16th Brigades were removed and dispatched to Burma, where both fought during the Japanese conquest of Burma. The 14th Brigade was renumbered the 114th Indian Infantry Brigade and remained with the division.

During 1942, the 33rd and 89th Brigades were added to the division. The division trained for operations in the deserts in the Middle East but by the end of the year, the North African campaign was clearly at an end. In early 1943, the division was reassigned to the Burma campaign and Major General Frank Messervy, a veteran of the fighting in North Africa, was appointed to command, replacing Major General Thomas Corbett.

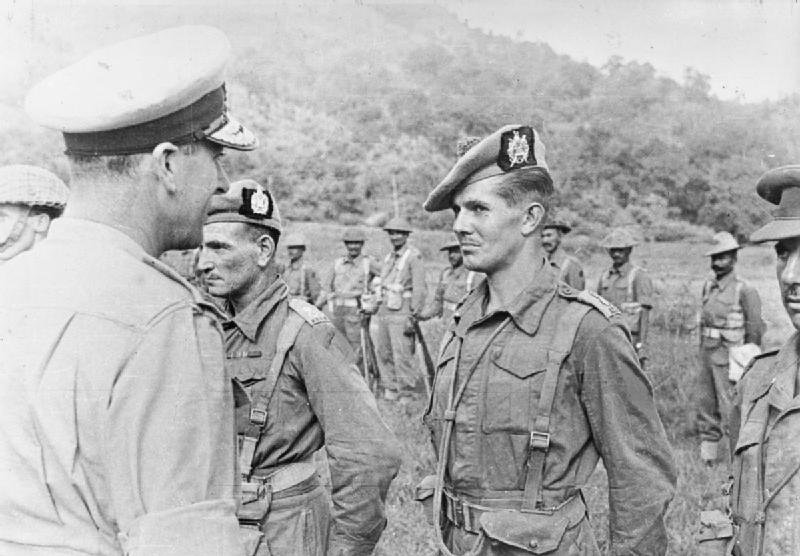
Lord Louis Mountbatten, Supreme Allied Commander South East Asia, talking to British officers of the 2nd Battalion, King's Own Scottish Borderers near the Arakan front, December 1943.

After extensive retraining and preparation, 7th Division took part in an offensive in Arakan, the coastal province of Burma. Starting in December 1943, the division advanced down the Kalapanzin River valley as part of XV Corps. In February 1944, Japanese troops infiltrated through the division's front and overran the divisional HQ. Units of the division took part in the subsequent Battle of the Admin Box, in which the Japanese failed to capture positions supplied by parachute drops and were forced to retreat.

During March, the Japanese launched a major offensive (codenamed Operation U-Go) into Manipur. Having been withdrawn from the Arakan battles, the division proceeded by road and rail to Dimapur, where it came under command of XXXIII Corps and took part in the Battle of Kohima. The 161st Indian Brigade, part of the 5th Indian Division, came under command, while the 89th Brigade was flown to Imphal, to replace 161st Brigade in 5th Division. During early May, 33rd Brigade completed the recapture of Kohima Ridge, while the main body of the division recaptured Naga Village to the north of the ridge. During the later part of the month and early June, the division advanced through heavy monsoon rains along rough tracks to the east of the main road from Kohima to Imphal, and cleared Japanese stragglers from Ukhrul.

From July to October, the division regrouped near Kohima, and 89th Brigade rejoined. Late in 1944, Major General Messervy was promoted to command IV Corps and was replaced in command of the division by Major General Geoffrey Charles Evans. Now commanded by IV Corps, the division advanced down the Gangaw Valley west of the Chindwin River, with the 28th (East Africa) Brigade under command, screened until Pauk was reached by the lightly equipped Lushai Brigade. During late February 1945, the division captured vital bridgeheads across the Irrawaddy River near Pakokku. During March, as part of the decisive Battle of Central Burma, the division was involved in several battles at Myingyan and Yenangyaung.

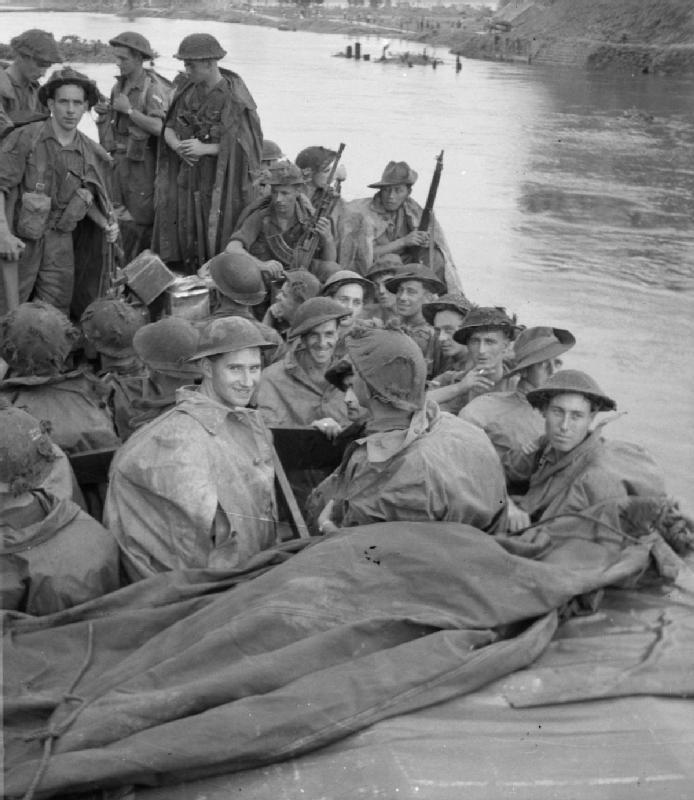
Men of the 1st Battalion, Queen's Royal Regiment (West Surrey), on patrol aboard an assault boat on the Pegu Canal near Waw, July 1945.

During April, the division once again came under command of XXXIII Corps and advanced down the west bank of the Irrawaddy. After Rangoon, the capital, was captured in early May, the division was directly commanded by the new headquarters of Twelfth Army and resisted Japanese diversionary attacks across the Sittang River during the monsoon.

After the war ended, in September 1945, the division moved to Thailand, where it disarmed the Japanese occupying army, and liberated and repatriated Allied prisoners of war.

Following the Partition of India in 1947 the 7th Division local units were split between India and Pakistan, and both armies continue to have a 7th Infantry Division with the Golden Arrow formation sign.

== Component Units (1 March 1944) ==
- 33rd Indian Infantry Brigade
  - 1st Battalion, Queen's Royal Regiment (West Surrey)
  - 4th Battalion, 15th Punjab Regiment
  - 4th Battalion, 1st Gurkha Rifles
- 89th Indian Infantry Brigade
  - 2nd Battalion, King's Own Scottish Borderers
  - 7th Battalion, 2nd Punjab Regiment
  - 4th Battalion, 8th Gurkha Rifles
- 114th Indian Infantry Brigade
  - 1st Battalion, Somerset Light Infantry replaced by 2nd South Lancashire Regiment (PWV) March 1944
  - 4th Battalion, 14th Punjab Regiment
  - 4th Battalion, 5th Royal Gurkha Rifles

=== Support Units ===
- 1st Battalion, 11th Sikh Regiment (Machine-gun unit)
- 136th (1st West Lancashire) Field Regt, Royal Artillery
- 139th (4th London) Field Regt, Royal Artillery
- 25th Mountain Regt. Indian Artillery
- 24th Light Anti-Aircraft / Anti-Tank Regt, Royal Artillery
- 62nd Field Company Royal Indian Engineers (IE)
- 77th Field Company IE
- 421st Field Company IE
- 303rd Field Park Company IE

== Commanders ==
- Maj. Gen. A.V.T. Wakely
- Maj. Gen. R. Richardson
- Maj. Gen. Thomas Corbett
- Maj. Gen. Frank Messervy
- Maj. Gen. Geoffrey Evans
- Maj. Gen. Frederick Joseph Loftus-Tottenham

== Assigned brigades ==
All these brigades were assigned or attached to the division at some time during World War II.

- 55th Indian Infantry Brigade
- 9th Indian Infantry Brigade
- 28th (East African) Infantry Brigade
- 268th Indian Infantry Brigade
- 22nd (East African) Infantry Brigade

== Bibliography ==
- Cole, Howard (1973). Formation Badges of World War 2. Britain, Commonwealth and Empire. London: Arms and Armour Press.
