= Frederick Loftus-Tottenham =

British Indian Army officer (1898–1987)

Major-General Frederick Loftus-Tottenham CBE DSO*
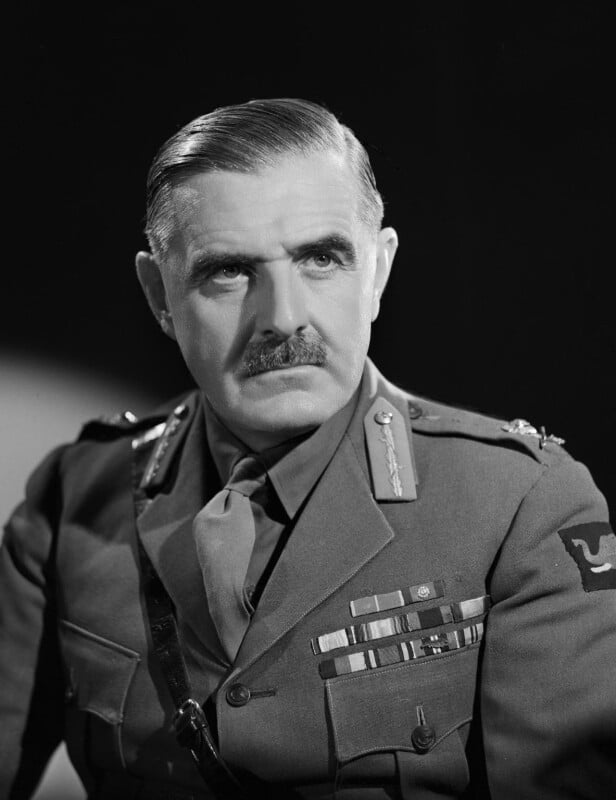
- Loftus-Tottenham in 1947
- Born: 4 May 1898; Naas, County Kildare, Ireland
- Died: 11 April 1987 (aged 88); Warminster, Wiltshire, England
- Military career
- Allegiance: United Kingdom
- Branch: British Indian Army
- Service years: 1916–1950
- Rank: Major-General
- Nickname: "Freddie"
- Service number: IA 73
- Unit: 2nd King Edward VII's Own Gurkha Rifles
- Commands: 1st Battalion, 10th Gurkha Rifles; 153rd Gurkha Parachute Battalion; 33rd Indian Infantry Brigade; 81st (West Africa) Division; 7th Indian Infantry Division; Force 401
- Conflicts: World War I World War II
- Awards: Commander of the Order of the British Empire (12 June 1947); Distinguished Service Order (22 June 1944); Distinguished Service Order (22 March 1945); Mentioned in dispatches (17 December 1942); MID (5 April 1945); MID (19 July 1945)

Major-General Frederick Joseph Loftus-Tottenham, CBE, DSO and Bar (4 May 1898 – 11 April 1987) was a British Indian Army officer who served during World War I and World War II. He later served in the Pakistan Army. During the latter, he rose from a major in command of an infantry battalion in 1940 to a major general commanding a division in 1944.

== Military career ==
Loftus-Tottenham passed out from the Cadet College, Wellington and was commissioned a second lieutenant as of 18 April 1916 and was attached to the 2nd King Edward VII's Own Gurkha Rifles (The Sirmoor Rifles). A year later he was promoted to lieutenant. He was promoted captain in April 1920 and in May 1934 he was promoted to major.

In 1940 he was advanced to lieutenant-colonel to command the newly raised 3rd battalion of the 1st Gurkha Rifles, stationed in Waziristan on the North West Frontier of India. He was mentioned in despatches for his services there. Having taken a parachute training course, he was appointed in October 1941 to raise and command the 153rd Gurkha Parachute Battalion, part of 50th Parachute Brigade. Though eventually he never had chance to lead his battalion into battle, he still gave it "form and substance, and above all a unique self-confidence and character that would remain with it until disbandment at the end of the war".

In February 1943 he was further promoted to acting brigadier to command the 33rd Indian Infantry Brigade, part of the 7th Indian Infantry Division. In October the brigade moved to the Arakan and in January 1944 took part in the division's attack down the Kalapanzin Valley to capture the only lateral route across the Mayu peninsula. British plans were forestalled in February by the Japanese Ha-Go Offensive which infiltrated and compromised the division's lines of supply. However, new tactics dictated that instead of retreating to protect supply lines, the division should hold firm forming defensive boxes to await relief from formations in reserve. Supplies would come from the air. The main target of the Japanese was the division's Admin Box and for a short while Loftus-Tottenham was given the task of co-ordinating the division's three brigades while divisional commander Major General Frank Messervy was out of touch, his HQ having been overrun. 33 Brigade saw heavy fighting but slowly, with their own supplies cut, the Japanese attack began to fade. By early March the division was once more on the attack and late in the month Loftus-Tottenham's brigade was withdrawn into reserve.

In April 1944 the brigade was airlifted from the Arakan as part of the reinforcements sent to XXXIII Indian Corps at Kohima facing the Japanese U Go offensive and experienced heavy fighting throughout May until the end of the battle. After a pause the brigade took part in the pursuit and then was withdrawn to refit and rest. In June Loftus-Tottenham was awarded the DSO.

In August 1944 Loftus-Tottenham was promoted to acting major-general to command the 81st West African Division which held the left hand flank of XV Corps' front in the Arakan. The division had virtually no transport, relying on auxiliary groups of porters to support each of its two brigades. In some respects this proved no disadvantage given the very poor going in the Kaladan Valley where the division was to operate and that access to the valley was via the "West African Way," a temporary jeep track constructed in 1943. As a result, the division relied for much of its supply from the air and constructed light aircraft and Dakota strips as it advanced. He also found the unit seriously short of non-commissioned officers since no British reinforcements had arrived; he therefore resorted to promoting Africans, who proved to be entirely satisfactory. In mid January the division had reached Myohaung and with two brigades from 82nd West African Division under command launched an attack which saw the key town taken by the end of the month when the division was relieved and withdrawn to Southern India. In March 1945 Loftus-Tottenham was awarded his second DSO. The medal's citation reads:

This role called for bold action and hard knocks and [Loftus Tottenham] drew two thirds of the garrison out of Akyab in the end.

The Jap tried to concentrate against him and knock him out as he had done successfully in Mar 1944, but Gen. Loftus-Tottenham maintained his mobility and the Jap failed to pin him down.

In India the division trained for an amphibious landing on the Kra Isthmus but the operation was cancelled and the division did not see further action.

After the war Loftus-Tottenham spent a time in command of Force 401, an expanded brigade group formed to protect British oil interests in south-west Iran and was based in southern Iraq, near Basra till its withdrawal in May–June 1947 (in connection with which he was appointed CBE), and then became GOC Iraq.

In 1947 he was placed in command of 7th Indian Infantry Division over the period of Partition and in the same year his permanent rank was advanced to full colonel. His retirement from the Indian Army (with the substantive rank of full colonel) was formally dated February 1948 but he remained active on the specially employed list seconded to the Pakistan Army (to which his division, now the 7th Infantry Division was allocated). He commanded the 7th Infantry Division till 1949, it was one of Pakistan's two field divisions and was based at Rawalpindi. He finally retired in August 1950 when he was accorded the honorary rank of major-general. However, he would later command the Home Guard in Northern Ireland during the four years, 1952–56, in which that body was revived in cadre form.

== Family ==
Loftus-Tottenham married Marjorie Fielden Dare in 1922. They had three sons, two of whom were Gurkha officers were killed in action during the Second World War (one at Cassino and the other in Burma, both aged 20 years). Widowed in 1978, he married again, to Isobel Helen Baker, in 1980.

== See also ==
- Arakan Campaign 1943/44
- Battle of the Admin Box
- Battle of Kohima
- Burma Campaign 1944-45 Southern Front

== Bibliography ==
- Mead, Richard (2007). Churchill's Lions: a biographical guide to the key British generals of World War II. Stroud (UK): Spellmount. ISBN 978-1-86227-431-0.
- Smart, Nick (2005). Biographical Dictionary of British Generals of the Second World War. Barnesley: Pen & Sword. ISBN 1844150496.
- Doherty, Richard (2004). Ireland's Generals in the Second World War. Dublin: Four Courts Press. ISBN 185182-865-6.
