= Umrao Singh =

Recipient of the Victoria Cross

Subedar Major Rao Umrao Singh Yadav V.C.
- Born: 21 November 1920; Palra, Punjab, British India (now Palra, Haryana, India)
- Died: 21 November 2005 (aged 85); New Delhi, India
- Military career
- Allegiance: British India; India
- Branch: British Indian Army; Indian Army
- Service years: 1939–1970
- Rank: Hon. Captain (Subedar-Major) Indian Army
- Units: Royal Indian Artillery; Regiment of Artillery
- Conflicts: World War II; North Africa campaign; Burma campaign
- Awards: Victoria Cross; Padma Bhushan

Subedar Major Umrao Singh Yadav VC (21 November 1920 – 21 November 2005) was an Indian soldier best known for being awarded the Victoria Cross, the highest and most prestigious award for gallantry in the face of the enemy that can be awarded to British and Commonwealth forces.

As a non-commissioned officer in the Royal Indian Artillery during the Second World War, he was the last survivor of only 40 Indian soldiers to be awarded the VC between 1912, when Indians first became eligible to be awarded the VC, and partition and independence of India in 1947.

== Early life ==
Umrao Singh Yadav, son of Mohar Singh, was born into a Hindu Ahir family in Palra, a small village in Jhajjar district in Haryana (then the Rohtak district of undivided Punjab), 50 km north of Delhi.

He attended a local school and joined the Indian Army during World War II in November 1939. He was promoted to Havildar (Sergeant) in the Royal Indian Artillery, Indian Army in 1942.

== Award ==
On the night of 15 to 16 December 1944 in the Kaladan valley, Burma, Umrao Singh was a field gun detachment commander in an advanced section of the 33 Mountain Battery, 30th Mountain Regiment, Indian Artillery, serving on detachment as part of the 81st West African Division in Viscount Slim's British 14th Army, supporting the advance of the XV Corps on the Arakan. Singh's gun was in an advanced position, supporting the 8th Gold Coast Regiment. After a 90-minute sustained bombardment from 75 mm guns and mortars from the Japanese 28th Army, Singh's gun position was attacked by at least two companies of Japanese infantry. He used a Bren light machine gun and directed the rifle fire of the gunners, holding off the assault. He was wounded by two grenades.

A second wave of attackers killed all but Singh and two other gunners, but was also beaten off. The three soldiers had only a few bullets remaining, and these were rapidly exhausted in the initial stages of the assault by a third wave of attackers. Undaunted, Singh picked up a "gun bearer" (a heavy iron rod, similar to a crow bar) and used that as a weapon in hand-to-hand fighting. He was seen to strike down three infantrymen, fatally wounded, before succumbing to a rain of blows.

Six hours later, after a counter-attack, he was found alive but unconscious near to his artillery piece, almost unrecognisable from a head injury, still clutching his gun bearer. Ten Japanese soldiers lay dead nearby and seven critically wounded. His field gun was back in action later that day.

== Later life ==
Singh was presented with his VC by King George VI at Buckingham Palace on 15 October 1945. The citation reads "Havildar Umrao Singh set a supreme example of gallantry and devotion to duty."

He was promoted after recovering from his wounds. He retired from the colonial Indian Army in 1946, but rejoined the army in 1947 following independence. On 1 February 1950, Singh was promoted to the junior commissioned officer rank of jemadar (equivalent to the present-day rank of naib subedar). He was promoted to subedar major on 2 May 1968, and to the honorary rank of captain on 15 August 1970 on the occasion of his retirement from service. After leaving the army a second time, he returned to farm his family's 2 acre (8,000 m^{2}) smallholding.

At the celebrations of the 50th anniversary of VE Day in London in 1995, he was almost turned away from the VIP tent because his name was not on the correct list, but Brigadier Tom Longland, who had organised the event, recognised his medal and gave orders for him to be admitted. After the event, Singh complained to British Prime Minister John Major about the meagre pension of £168 per year paid to the then ten surviving Indian VC holders. The amount had remained fixed since 1960, but Major subsequently arranged for the pension to be raised to £1,300 per year. He was awarded the Padma Bhushan in 1983.

He attended the service of dedication of the Victoria Cross and George Cross Memorial in Westminster Abbey on 14 May 2003. In his book 'Toward Resurgent India', Lt. Gen. (Retd.) M. M. Lakhera, PVSM, AVSM, VSM writes:

I had gone to UK in 1995 as Deputy Leader of the Indian Delegation to take part in the 50th Anniversary celebrations of the victory in Europe during the Second World War. I, along with four other Army officers, had just stepped out after attending the inaugural session and were waiting on the roadside for the traffic to ease so as to walk across the road to the vehicle park. Among those with me was Honorary Captain Umrao Singh, a Victoria Cross winner. All of a sudden, a car moving on the road came to a halt in front of us and a well-dressed gentleman stepped out. He approached Umrao Singh and said, "Sir, may I have the privilege of shaking hands with the Victoria Cross (winner)?" He shook hands with him. Evidently he had spotted Umrao Singh's medal from his car and had stopped his car to pay his respect to a winner of the highest gallantry medal of his country. Then he looked at me and said, "General, you are from the Indian Army." When I replied in the affirmative, he gave out his name, saying that he was Michael Heseltine. I was absolutely astounded, as the recognition dawned on me that he was the Deputy Prime Minister of [the] UK. I was totally overawed by such courtesy shown by a dignitary of the second highest status in the British Government, and humbly thanked him for having invited our delegation for the VE-Day function. Again, his reply was typical of his sagacity, "General, it is we, the British, who should be grateful to your country and your Armed Forces, who had helped us win both the First and the Second world wars. How can we be ever so ungrateful to forget your country's great contribution?" Suddenly I became conscious that all the traffic behind his car had come to stand still. I hurried to thank him and politely requested him to move along to relieve the traffic hold-up. He stated, "Sir, how dare I drive off when [the] Victoria Cross has to cross the road." Realizing his genuine feeling I and my colleagues quickly crossed the road. Reaching the other side I looked back and saw that Mr. Heseltine was still standing waiting for the Victoria Cross to be safely across.

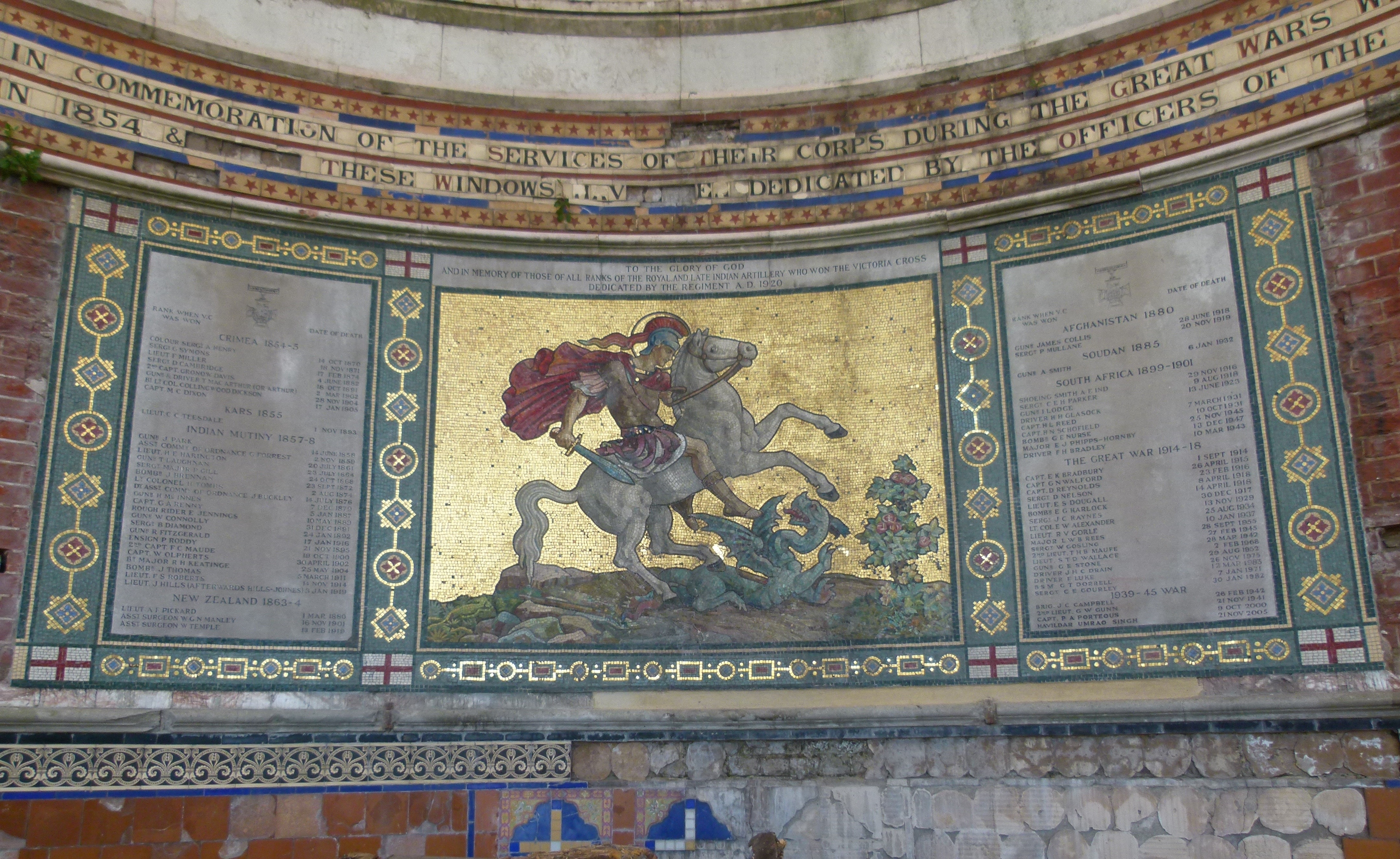
RA Victoria Cross memorial in the ruined Garrison Church of St George in Woolwich, London. Sing's name was the last one added (bottom right)

After being diagnosed with prostate cancer in July 2005, he died, at the Army Research and Referral Hospital in New Delhi on his 85th birthday, 21 November 2005. He was cremated in his native village with full military honours, attended by Bhupinder Singh Hooda (Chief Minister of Haryana), General Joginder Jaswant Singh (Army Chief), and Lt Gen Charanjit Singh (Director General of Artillery). His wife, Vimla pre-deceased him, but he was survived by two sons and a daughter.

In spite of personal hardship and receiving substantial offers, Singh refused to sell his medal during his lifetime, saying that selling the medal would "stain the honour of those who fell in battle".

His name was the last one to be added to the memorial of Victoria Cross winners of the Royal Artillery in the apse of St George's Garrison Church in Woolwich, London, near the Royal Artillery Barracks.

== Awards ==

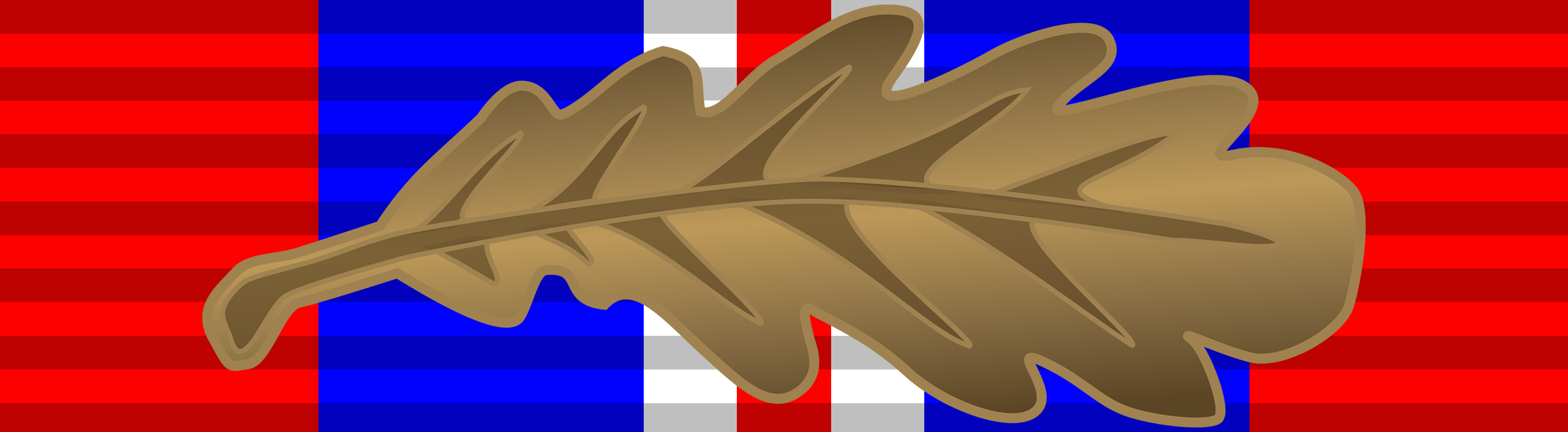

Padma Bhushan	General Service Medal 1947	Samanya Seva Medal	Samar Seva Star
Raksha Medal	Indian Independence Medal	20 Years Long Service Medal	9 Years Long Service Medal
Victoria Cross	1939–45 Star	Burma Star	War Medal 1939-1945
India Service Medal	Queen Elizabeth II Coronation Medal	Queen Elizabeth II Silver Jubilee Medal	Queen Elizabeth II Golden Jubilee Medal
