= 33rd Indian Infantry Brigade =

- Active: 1 October 1941 – November 1946
- Country: British India
- Allegiance: British Crown
- Branch: British Indian Army
- Type: Infantry
- Size: Brigade
- Part of: 7th Indian Infantry Division
- Engagements: Second World War Burma Campaign

Commanders
- Notable commanders: F.J. Loftus-Tottenham

The 33rd Indian Infantry Brigade was an infantry brigade of the British Indian Army that saw active service in the Indian Army during the Second World War, notably in the Burma Campaign.

== History ==
The 33rd Indian Infantry Brigade was formed in October 1941, at Campbellpore in India. The brigade was assigned to the 7th Indian Infantry Division until July 1942, when it was attached to the North Western Army. It returned to the 7th Division in December 1942, and took part in the Burma Campaign. Between April and May 1944, it was corps reserve for XXXIII Indian Corps and was attached to the 5th Indian Infantry Division in March 1945. The rest of the war was under the 7th Division command.

== Order of battle ==
The brigade included the following units:

- 4th Battalion, 5th Gurkha Rifles October 1941 to January 1944
- 4th Battalion, 10th Gurkha Rifles October to December 1941
- 4th Battalion, 15th Punjab Regiment April 1942 to August 1945
- 4th Battalion, 8th Gurkha Rifles May to October 1942
- 4th Battalion, 1st Gurkha Rifles February 1944 to August 1945
- 1st Battalion, Queen's Royal Regiment (West Surrey) December 1942 to September 1944 and April to August 1945
- 1st Battalion, 11th Sikh Regiment March to April 1944
- 1st Battalion, Burma Regiment May 1944 to April 1945
- 2nd Battalion, South Lancashire Regiment February 1945
- 2nd Battalion, 8th Punjab Regiment May 1945
- 1st Battalion, 19th Hyderabad Regiment May 1945

== Commanders ==
The brigade had the following commanders in the Second World War:

From	Rank	Name	Notes
1 October 1941	Brigadier	B.C. Pigot MC	
December 1942	Brigadier	F.J. Loftus-Tottenham DSO	
24 August 1944	Brigadier	R.G. Collingwood DSO	
28 March 1945	Lt. Col.	L.H.O. Pugh DSO	acting (from 25th Mountain Regiment, IA)
19 May 1945	Brigadier	J.S. Vickers DSO	
10 December 1945	Brigadier	E.H.W. Cobb CBE	

== See also ==
- List of Indian Army Brigades in World War II

== Bibliography ==
- Kempton, Chris (2003b). 'Loyalty & Honour', The Indian Army September 1939 – August 1947. Vol. Part II Brigades. Milton Keynes: The Military Press. ISBN 0-85420-238-2.
