= IV Corps (United Kingdom) =

- Formation sign of IV Corps during the Second World War.
- Active: 1903–1919; 1940–1945
- Country: United Kingdom
- Branch: British Army
- Engagements: First Battle of Ypres; Battle of Neuve Chapelle; Second Battle of Ypres; Battle of Aubers Ridge; Battle of Festubert; Battle of Loos; Operations on the Ancre; German retreat to the Hindenburg Line; Cambrai 1917, 1918; Battle of the Somme 1918; Battles of the Hindenburg Line; Final Advance in Picardy; Norwegian Campaign; Burma Campaign

Commanders
- Notable commanders: Sir Henry Rawlinson; Claude Auchinleck; Noel Irwin; Geoffry Scoones; Frank Messervy; Francis Grenfell

Insignia
- Corps formation sign during the First World War.

IV Corps was a corps-sized formation of the British Army, formed in both the First World War and the Second World War. During the First World War the corps served on the Western Front throughout its existence. During the Second World War it served in Norway and Britain until it was transferred to India, which was threatened with attack after Japan entered the war.

== Prior to the First World War ==
In 1876 a Mobilisation Scheme for eight army corps was published, with '4th Corps' headquartered at Dublin and comprising the regular units of Irish Command, supported with militia. In 1880, it was organised as follows:

- 1st Division (Dublin)
  - 1st Brigade (Dublin)
    - 1st Bn. 22nd Foot (Dublin), 82nd Foot (Dublin), 3rd Bn. Rifle Brigade (Dublin)
  - 2nd Brigade (Belfast)
    - Queen's Edinburgh Light Infantry Militia (Dalkeith), 1st Lanark Militia (Hamilton), 2nd Lanark Militia (Lanark)
  - Divisional Troops
    - Highland Light Infantry Militia (Inverness), 3rd Dragoon Guards (Dublin), 19th Company Royal Engineers (Southampton)
  - Artillery
    - O/3rd Brigade RA (The Curragh)
- 2nd Division (The Curragh)
  - 1st Brigade (The Curragh)
    - 1st Bn. 16th Foot (Athlone), 38th Foot (The Curragh), 95th Foot (The Curragh)
  - 2nd Brigade (The Curragh)
    - 1st West York Militia (Pontefract), 2nd West York Militia (York), 3rd West York Militia (Doncaster)
  - Divisional Troops
    - 4th West York Militia (Leeds), 2nd Dragoon Guards (Dublin), 6th Company Royal Engineers (The Curragh)
  - Artillery
    - P/3rd Brigade RA (The Curragh), K/2nd Brigade RA (Kilkenny), I/2nd Brigade RA (Athlone)
- 3rd Division (Cork)
  - 1st Brigade (Cork)
    - 1st Somerset Militia (Taunton), 2nd Somerset Militia (Bath), Hereford Militia (Hereford)
  - 2nd Brigade (Limerick)
    - 1st Warwick Militia (Warwick), 2nd Warwick Militia (Leamington Spa), Glamorgan Militia (Cardiff)
  - Divisional Troops
    - 1st Bn. 7th Foot (Cork), 19th Hussars (Ballincollig), 18th Company Royal Engineers (Cork)
  - Artillery
    - N/3rd Brigade RA (Clonmel), M/3rd Brigade RA (Limerick), H/2nd Brigade RA (Fermoy)
- Cavalry Brigade (The Curragh)
  - 2nd Dragoons (Dundalk), 7th Hussars (Cahir), 20th Hussars (Newbridge), I Battery B Brigade RHA (Ballincollig)
- Corps Artillery
  - H Battery B Brigade RHA (Newbridge), B Battery A Brigade RHA (Dublin), G Battery B Brigade RHA (Dublin)

This scheme had been dropped by 1881.

The 1901 Army Estimates (introduced by St John Brodrick when Secretary of State for War) allowed for six army corps based on the six regional commands: IV Corps was to be formed by Eastern Command with headquarters in London. It was to comprise 27 artillery batteries (18 Regular, 6 Militia and 3 Volunteer) and 25 infantry battalions (8 Regular, 8 Militia and 9 Volunteers). Lieutenant General Lord Grenfell was appointed acting General Officer Commanding-in-Chief (GOCinC) of IV Corps in April 1903. Under Army Order No 38 of 1907 the corps titles disappeared, but Eastern Command continued to be a major administrative organisation, controlling two cavalry brigades and one infantry division (4th Division).

== First World War ==
The Corps had its origin in a force operating independently against the German invasion of Belgium under the command of Lieut-Gen Sir Henry Rawlinson. It was transferred from War Office control to the British Expeditionary Force on 9 October 1914, and the BEF"s commander, Sir John French, constituted it as IV Corps. It bore part of the brunt of the defence in the early stages of the First Battle of Ypres. Initially it comprised the 7th Infantry Division and 3rd Cavalry Division, but these were transferred in late October. IV Corps was reconstituted on 6 November. It then fought at the Battle of Neuve Chapelle and subsidiary actions, the Battle of Aubers Ridge, and The Battle of Festubert, the Battle of Loos and associated actions. Rawlinson's failure to bring reserves to the IV Corps front lines allowed the Imperial German Army to regroup and caused the BEF counteroffensive to fail to break through.

In 1916 the corps was commanded by Sir Henry Wilson. The corps was initially holding a stretch of five miles from Loos to just south of Givenchy, between Hubert Gough's I Corps in the north and French 9th Army Corps (part of Victor d'Urbal's Tenth Army) in the south. Wilson, noting the difference in quality between his divisions, took a keen interest in training and did much lecturing.

In March the British took over line from French Tenth Army. IV Corps was moved south of Givenchy, opposite Vimy Ridge, which gave the Germans the advantage of height. 47th Division conducted effective mining operations on 3 May and 15 May. A surprise German attack on the evening of Sunday 21 May moved forward 800 yards, capturing 1,000 yards of the British front line. The subsequent counterattack failed and Wilson was almost "degummed" (relieved of command).

Wilson resisted pressure from Haig to conduct a limited attack until after 1 September. With another "Big Push" due on the Somme in September, Wilson's attack was postponed until October, and GHQ now wanted the whole of Vimy Ridge taken, which would mean a joint attack with XVII Corps. Edmonds later wrote that Wilson's preparations had laid the foundations for the successful capture of Vimy Ridge in April 1917. The attack at Vimy never took place as IV Corps was incorporated into Gough's Reserve Army, where it remained in reserve during the Battle of the Ancre.

The corps also took part in the German Retreat to the Hindenburg Line, the Battle of Cambrai and associated actions, the First Battles of the Somme and associated actions, the Second Battle of the Somme, the Battle of St. Quentin Canal and associated actions, and the final advance in Picardy.

=== Composition in the First World War ===
The composition of army corps changed frequently. Some representative orders of battle for IV Corps are given here.

Order of Battle at Ypres 10 November 1914:

General Officer Commanding (GOC): Lieutenant-General Sir Henry Rawlinson

- Brigadier-General, General Staff: R.A.K. Montgomery
- Brigadier-General, Royal Artillery: A.H. Hussey
- Colonel, Royal Engineers: R.U.H. Buckland
- 7th Division
- 8th Division

By the time of the battles of Aubers Ridge and Festubert (May 1915), IV Corps still had 7th and 8th Divisions under command, but had been reinforced by 49th (West Riding) Division of the Territorial Force.

Order of Battle in 1916

Once the era of trench warfare had set in on the Western Front (1915–17), the BEF left its army corps in position for long periods, so that they became familiar with their sector, while rotating divisions as they required rest, training, or transfer to other sectors. Thirteen different divisions passed through IV Corps during the eleven-month tenure of the new corps commander, Lieutenant General Sir Henry Wilson, and only one, the 47th, stayed for longer than six months.

In December 1915 IV Corps consisted of 1st (formerly a regular division), 47th (London Territorials) and 15th (Scottish) Division and 16th (Irish) Division (both New Army). Wilson was impressed by the standard of training in the 15th but not the 16th. In the spring it lost 1st, 15th and 16th Divisions and gained 2nd (formerly a regular division) from I Corps. IV Corps also gained 23rd (New Army). At this time, with the army having recently grown tenfold in size, there was little in the way of formal ongoing assessment of officers' performance, so Gough, the Reserve Army commander, passed on his informal (and low) opinion of the 2nd Division GOC William G. Walker, who was later relieved. (Wilson Diary 24 February 1916).

In early April the 23rd Division was taken away, and a number of guns with it. By August, IV Corps contained two divisions, the 63rd (Royal Naval) Division and the 9th (Scottish) Division (New Army). Some of IV Corps artillery was moved down to the Somme. Then the 63rd and 9th Divisions were taken away, then in October the whole Corps was transferred to Gough's Reserve Army on the Somme, although it was used as a holding formation rather than being deployed into the front line. At one point, by 18 October, IV Corps had no divisions at all.

During 1916, able staff officers were still in short supply and such men were poached from IV Corps and its component divisions by Rawlinson for Fourth Army HQ.

Order of Battle at the start of the final advance in Picardy (27 September 1918)

GOC: Lieutenant-General Sir George Harper

- 5th Division
- 37th Division
- 42nd (Eastern Lancashire) Division
- New Zealand Division

== Second World War ==
=== Norway ===
The Corps was reformed in Alresford in Hampshire in February 1940 in anticipation of operations in Norway, or perhaps Finland (part of a projected intervention in the Russo-Finnish Winter War). From March to May 1940 parts of the corps fought at Narvik and Trondheim in the Norwegian campaign. Its commander was Lieutenant General Claude Auchinleck.

=== Home Forces ===
After the Norwegian campaign ended, the Corps first commanded most of the armoured reserves preparing to face the proposed German invasion of Britain (Operation Sea Lion), while the other corps headquarters which had been evacuated from Dunkirk in Operation Dynamo were reorganised. IV Corps was envisaged as a counter-attack force under Lieutenant-General Sir Francis Nosworthy. Once the danger of invasion was over, the corps was heavily involved in training and developing tactical doctrine. The corps was based at Guilsborough House near Northampton until August 1940 when it moved to Latimer House near Chesham.

Order of Battle Autumn 1940

- 2nd Armoured Division (16 June–4 August 1940)
- 42nd (East Lancashire) Division (9 September–6 November 1940)
- 43rd (Wessex) Division (19 June–5 November 1940)
- 31st Independent Brigade Group (1 August 1940–15 February 1941)
- HQ Royal Artillery
  - 154th (Leicestershire Yeomanry) Army Field Regiment
  - 67th Medium Regiment

=== Iraq ===
In January 1942 the Corps headquarters was dispatched to Iraq, as part of Middle East Command. Its commander was Lieutenant General Thomas Corbett. In 1942, Corbett was appointed Chief of Staff of Middle East Command and Lieutenant General Noel Irwin took over IV Corps.

=== India / Burma ===
Following the Japanese conquest of Burma, several British divisions from Britain and the Middle East, and IV Corps headquarters, were deployed to India, then filled out with Indian Army Corps of Signals and line-of-communications units. It took over from the ad hoc Burma Corps headquarters, which was disbanded, at Imphal in Manipur in Northeast India. It reported to the Eastern Army. The Corps adopted a badge of a charging elephant, in black on a red background.

In July 1942, Irwin was promoted to command Eastern Army. His successor in command of IV Corps was Lieutenant-General Geoffry Scoones. It was engaged in patrol activity as far as the Chindwin River and construction of airfields and roads. From late 1943, the Corps formed part of the newly created Fourteenth Army.

In 1944 the Japanese sought to disrupt Allied attacks into Burma by launching an attack, codenamed U-Go, against Imphal, which led to the epic Battle of Imphal. At the start of the battle the Corps consisted of the Indian 17th, 20th and 23rd Divisions, with the Indian 50th Parachute Brigade and 254th Indian Tank Brigade. During the early stages of the battle, the 5th Indian Division was flown into Imphal to join the corps.

The Corps was surrounded by the Imperial Japanese Army but eventually defeated their attackers. Supplies and reinforcements were flown in to support the besieged troops, and casualties and non-combatants were flown out. The siege ended on 22 June, when troops from IV Corps met the relieving forces from XXXIII Corps north of Imphal. From then until the monsoon ended later in the year, formations from IV Corps (the 5th Indian Division and the newly arrived 11th East African Division) cleared the Japanese from east of the Chindwin, and established several bridgeheads across the river.

In November 1944, as the rains ended, Fourteenth Army prepared to make a decisive attack into Central Burma. Lieutenant General Scoones was appointed to Central Command, an army-level headquarters in India, and replaced in charge of IV Corps by Lieutenant-General Frank Messervy. In preparation for the offensive, several divisions were organised as motorised and air-portable formations.

The offensive began with IV Corps on the left of Fourteenth Army, led by the newly arrived 19th Indian Division. It became apparent that the Japanese had fallen back behind the Irrawaddy River. The 19th Division was transferred to XXXIII Corps and IV Corps was switched to the right flank of the Army, advancing down the Gangaw valley west of the Chindwin, led by the East African 28th Infantry Brigade and an ad-hoc infantry formation, the Lushai Brigade. In late February, the 7th Indian Infantry Division won bridgeheads over the Irrawaddy. The motorised 17th Indian Division, with the M4 Sherman tanks of the 255th Indian Tank Brigade, followed up through these bridgeheads and struck deep into Japanese occupied territory to capture the vital transport and supply centre of Meiktila. Reinforced by troops landed at the airfields near the town, it defended against Japanese counter-attacks during March.

Following the Japanese defeat in Central Burma, Fourteenth Army was reorganised. IV Corps now commanded the motorised 5th and 17th Indian Divisions, the 19th Indian Division (which remained on a mixed animal and motor transport establishment) and the 255th Tank Brigade. During April, the 5th and 17th Divisions alternated in the lead of the final drive on Rangoon down the Sittang River valley, while the 19th Division secured the corps' line of communications. By the start of May when the monsoon began, the Corps had been held up 40 miles (64 km) from Rangoon. Rangoon was captured by an amphibious landing, Operation Dracula, having been abandoned by its garrison.

Shortly after the fall of Rangoon, IV Corps was withdrawn from the control of Fourteenth Army and placed under the newly activated Twelfth Army. Temporarily commanded by Lieutenant-General Francis Tuker, it was responsible for mopping up the remaining Japanese forces in Burma until the end of the war including the defeat of a large break-out in the Pegu Yoma. The Corps was deactivated shortly after the end of hostilities.

== General Officers Commanding ==
Commanders have included:

- 1 April 1903: General the Lord Grenfell
- 6 June 1904: General the Lord Methuen (4th Army Corps was renamed Eastern Command 1 June 1905)
- Oct 1914 – Dec 1915 Lieutenant-General Henry Rawlinson
- Dec 1915 – end 1916 Lieutenant-General Henry Wilson
- 1916–1918 Lieutenant-General Charles Woollcombe
- Mar 1918 – Jun 1919 Lieutenant-General George Harper
- Feb 1940 – May 1940 Lieutenant-General Claude Auchinleck
- Jul 1940 – Nov 1941 Lieutenant-General Francis Nosworthy
- Jan 1942 – Mar 1942 Lieutenant-General Thomas Corbett
- Apr 1942 – Jul 1942 Lieutenant-General Noel Irwin
- Aug 1942 – Dec 1944 Lieutenant-General Sir Geoffry Scoones
- Dec 1944 – Jul 1945 Lieutenant-General Sir Frank Messervy
- Jul 1945 – Aug 1945 Lieutenant-General Sir Francis Tuker
