= 14th Indian Infantry Brigade =

14th Indian Infantry Brigade 114th Indian Infantry Brigade
- Active: 1939–1945
- Country: (British Raj) British India
- Allegiance: British Empire
- Branch: British Indian Army
- Type: Infantry
- Size: Brigade

Commanders
- Notable commanders: Brigadier M R Roberts

The 14th Indian Infantry Brigade was an infantry brigade formation of the Indian Army during World War II. The brigade was formed at Attock, now in Pakistan, in October 1940, and assigned to the 7th Indian Infantry Division. In April 1942, the brigade was renumbered as the 114th Indian Infantry Brigade. The brigade fought in the Burma Campaign with the 7th Indian Division and later the 26th Indian Infantry Division.

== Formation ==
=== 14th Indian Infantry Brigade ===
- 3rd Battalion, 9th Jat Regiment October 1940 to March 1941
- 2nd Battalion, 4th Bombay Grenadiers October 1940 to March 1941
- 1st Battalion, 9th Jat Regiment March to October 1941
- Shamsher Dal Regiment (of the Nepalese Army) March to October 1941
- 7th Battalion, Jammu and Kashmir Infantry Indian State Forces June to September 1941
- 1st Battalion, 7th Duke of Edinburgh's Own Gurkha Rifles July to September 1941
- 2nd Battalion, Worcestershire Regiment July to September 1941
- Bairab Nath Regiment (of the Nepalese Army) July to September 1941
- 7th Battalion, 16th Punjab Regiment September 1941 to March 1942
- 4th Battalion, 8 Gorkha Rifles October 1941 to March 1942
- 9th Battalion, 11th Sikh Regiment October 1941 to March 1942

=== 114th Indian Infantry Brigade ===
- 4th Battalion, 14th Punjab Regiment April 1942 to February 1945
- 4th Battalion, 5th Gurkha Rifles April 1942 t August 1945
- 7th Battalion, 15th Punjab Regiment April to October 1942
- 1st Battalion, Somerset Light Infantry November 1942 to April 1944
- 2nd Battalion, South Lancashire Regiment April 1944 to July 1945
- 4th Battalion, 14th Punjab Regiment April to August 1945
- 4th Battalion, Queen's Own Royal West Kent Regiment June to July 1945
- 1st Battalion, 9th Jat Regiment July to August 1945
- 4th Battalion, 10th Gurkha Rifles July to August 1945

== See also ==
- List of Indian Army Brigades in World War II
