= Thomas Corbett (Indian Army officer) =

British Indian Army general (1888–1981)

- Born: 2 June 1888
- Died: 30 December 1981 (aged 93); Sussex, England
- Relatives: Jim Corbett (uncle)
- Military career
- Allegiance: United Kingdom
- Branch: British Indian Army
- Service years: 1907–1943
- Rank: Lieutenant general
- Service number: 173461
- Commands: 7th Indian Infantry Division (1942–43); IV Corps (1942); 31st Indian Armoured Division (1940–42); Sialkot Brigade (1938–40)
- Conflicts: World War I World War II
- Awards: Companion of the Order of the Bath; Military Cross & Bar; Mentioned in dispatches (2)

Lieutenant General Thomas William Corbett, CB, MC & Bar (2 June 1888 – 30 December 1981) was a British Indian Army officer who commanded the IV Corps during the Second World War.

== Early life and military career ==
Thomas Corbett was, through his father, also named Thomas, a nephew of the hunter Jim Corbett. Corbett attended the Royal Military College, Sandhurst and was commissioned onto the Unattached List for the British Indian Army on 19 January 1907. Posted to India, he was attached to the 1st Battalion, Queen's Royal Regiment (West Surrey) on 15 March 1907 for a year. He was admitted to the Indian Army 15 March 1908 and joined 9th Hodson's Horse.

Following the outbreak of World War I, Corbett landed in France on 7 November 1914 and was wounded on 21 December. He became staff captain of the 3rd (Ambala) Cavalry Brigade on 4 April 1916, brigade major for the 1st Cavalry Brigade on 8 June 1917, and brigade major for the Ambala Brigade on 23 February 1918. He served in France until 31 March 1918, when he transferred to serve in Palestine. He was awarded the Military Cross in the London Gazette of 3 June 1918. He was wounded on 23 May while leading a trench raid, for which he was later awarded a Bar to his Military Cross. The bar's citation reads:

For conspicuous gallantry and devotion to duty. He led a very successful raid on enemy trenches, causing the enemy heavy casualties in killed and wounded. He showed high qualities of organisation, courage, and leadership, and it was largely due to his fine example that the raid against greatly superior numbers was successful.

Corbett was also mentioned in dispatches twice. He went on to be brigade major for the 160th Brigade, Egyptian Expeditionary Force on 2 August 1918.

== Between the wars ==
After the war Corbett became Deputy Adjutant and Quartermaster General for 4th Cavalry Division of the Egyptian Expeditionary Force from 7 August 1919 to 31 August 1920.

Corbett attended Staff College, Quetta in 1921–22 and was appointed a general staff officer grade 2 on the General Staff, Southern Command, India from 15 February 1922 until 28 August 1925. He was again appointed a general staff officer grade 2 as staff officer to Major-General Cavalry from 26 September 1925 to 4 December 1926.

Corbett was appointed a general staff officer grade 2 and instructor at the Staff College, Quetta from 14 January 1930 to 31 August 1932, and transferred to 2nd Lancers on 12 May 1930. He served as commanding officer of 2nd Lancers from 31 October 1933 to 7 April 1935. He was subsequently appointed to the post of assistant adjutant and quartermaster general from 8 April 1935 to 5 September 1935. He served as a general staff officer grade 1 and instructor at the Staff College, Quetta from 6 September 1935 to 27 June 1938 and as commander of the Sialkot Brigade from 2 August 1938 to 28 January 1940.

== Second World War ==
Corbett served in the Second World War as a brigadier responsible for the cavalry at Army Headquarters, India and then as Inspector of Cavalry Army Headquarters India from 29 January 1940 to 31 August 1940, before becoming General Officer Commanding (GOC) of the 1st Indian Armoured Division on 1 September (later known as 31st Indian Armoured Division). He was appointed a Companion of the Order of the Bath in January 1941. He went on to be commander of IV Corps from January to March 1942 in Iraq, before being appointed chief of staff in the Middle East later that year. Corbett, despite being recommended for command of the British Eighth Army by Claude Auchinleck, was instead dismissed in the so-called 'Cairo purge' in August 1942.

He was then GOC of the 7th Indian Infantry Division in India from 23 October 1942 until July 1943, when he handed command over to Frank Messervy before retiring as a major general 23 October 1943. The reason for his sudden removal from his division was, apparently, a security lapse which "brought down on his head the wrath of Higher Command."

By October 1945 Corbett had been re-employed as head of the Combined Inter Services Historical Section (India) while on the Indian Regular Reserve of Officers.

== Postwar years ==
After retiring from the army Corbett, listing his recreation as painting, eventually settled in Sussex and remarried in 1952 after the death of his first wife. How he spent the remaining years of his long life is not known although The Times described him as a "brave, modest and kindly man."

== Bibliography ==
- Smart, Nick (2005). Biographical Dictionary of British Generals of the Second World War. Barnesley: Pen & Sword. ISBN 1844150496.

Military offices
New command	GOC 1st Indian Armoured Division; 1940–1941	Post redesignated 31st Indian Armoured Division
New command	GOC 31st Indian Armoured Division; 1941–1942	Succeeded by Robert Wordsworth
Preceded by Francis Nosworthy	GOC IV Corps; January – March 1942	Succeeded by Noel Irwin
Preceded by Roland Richardson	GOC 7th Indian Infantry Division; 1942–1943	Succeeded by Frank Messervy
