= Royal Indian Artillery =

Corps of the British Indian Army

The Royal Indian Artillery, known formally as the Royal Regiment of Indian Artillery (1945–1950) and before that, the Regiment of Indian Artillery (1827–1945) was an operational corps of the British Indian Army.

The East India Company raised the first regular company of Artillery in 1748, with a small percentage of Indian Gunners called Gun Lashkars, Tindals and Serangs. A few Indian Mountain Batteries, officered by the British, were raised in the 19th century and formed part of the Royal Artillery. Royal Indian Artillery (RIA) of British India Army, was raised on September 28, 1827, as a part of the Bombay Army, a presidency army of the Bombay Presidency. It was later renamed as 5 Bombay Mountain Battery, and involved in First Anglo-Afghan War (1839–1842). The Indian Rebellion of 1857 was sparked off in Meerut on 10 May 1857, primarily by native artillery of Bengal Army, following which all Indian artillery units were banned except mountain artillery batteries, though for his service during the Indian Rebellion, Major Richard Keatinge of Bombay Artillery, was awarded the Victoria Cross in 1858.

The RIA saw extensive service in the First World War, in East Africa, Gallipoli, Mesopotamia and Palestine.

3rd Anti-Tank Regiment, Indian Artillery, now 8 Field Regiment (India) served with the 34th Indian Division as part of the Ceylon garrison.

The Royal title was conferred upon the regiment in 1945. The partition of India in 1947 resulted in the RIA being divided between the newly formed artillery regiments of India (Regiment of Artillery) and Pakistan.

The most celebrated member of the RIA was Umrao Singh Yadav, who was awarded the Victoria Cross in World War II.

The 'Royal' prefix from the regiment's formal name was dropped when India became a republic in 1950, when it became known as the Regiment of Artillery. The Regiment of Artillery continues as part of the Indian Army.

== See also ==
- Royal Artillery
