= West Africa Command =

- Formation Sign
- Active: 1940 to 1956
- Country: United Kingdom
- Branch: British Army
- Type: Command
- Garrison/HQ: Achimota College, Accra, Gold Coast

West Africa Command was a Command of the British Army. Conflicting information indicates that the command was either based at Achimota College in Accra or in Nigeria. It was disbanded in 1956.

== History ==
After the First World War, military forces in the four British West African colonies (Nigeria, the Gold Coast, Sierra Leone, and the Gambia) were under the control of the individual colonial governments. "The regiments of the four colonies were all under the umbrella of the Royal West African Frontier Force. An Inspector General of African Colonial Forces was appointed to oversee their training and act as military adviser to the colonial governments. H.Q. Military Forces West Africa was formed on the 7 July 1940 with the arrival of Lieutenant General George Giffard and one staff officer. The headquarters were established on the 15 July near Accra. His task was the defence of all West African territories and coordination of all Military resources in these colonies." Additionally the command was an important recruiting ground for allied servicemen: it recruited 200,000 soldiers for the allies while defending itself from Vichy aggression.

From 31 May 1944, there was a Royal Air Force communications squadron associated with the area, and at times directly associated with the West Africa Command. The West Africa Communication Squadron RAF was formed on 31 May 1944; disbanded July 1945 and renamed twice; reformed on 1 October 1946 at RAF Waterloo in South Africa; and finally disbanded on 25 September 1947.

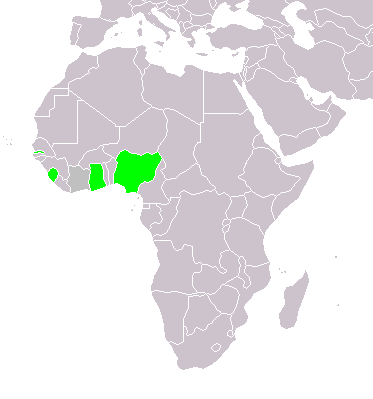
West Africa Command's military area of responsibility.

Postwar plans to raise an infantry division in West Africa as part of a British strategic reserve were not realised due to lack of funding. It would have required 1,200 British officers and NCOs, construction totalling £13 million, and taken four to six years to establish.

After disbandment, West Africa Command's infrastructure, including the officer training school at Teshie, was used by the new Ghana Army.

== Commanders-in-Chief ==
Commanders-in-Chief have included:

- 1940–1943 Lieutenant General George Giffard
- 1943–1945 Lieutenant General Francis Nosworthy
- 1945–1946 Lieutenant General Brocas Burrows
- 1946–1948 Lieutenant General Noel Irwin
- 1948–1951 Lieutenant General Cameron Nicholson
- 1951–1953 Lieutenant General Lashmer Whistler
- 1953–1956 Lieutenant General Otway Herbert

== See also ==
- West Africa Command Communication Squadron RAF - formed in July 1945, disbanded 1 November 1945.

== Sources ==
- Lake, A (1999). Flying units of the RAF. Shrewsbury, UK: Airlife. ISBN 1-84037-086-6.
