= 34th Infantry Division (India) =

The 34th Indian Infantry Division was an infantry division of the Indian Army during World War II. It was formed in March 1942 as the garrison of Ceylon. It never saw any combat and was disbanded in 1945.

Francis Tuker, then a temporary brigadier, he was appointed General Officer Commanding (GOC) 34th Indian Division on 1 October 1941 with the acting rank of major-general.

== Order of battle ==
- 98th Indian Infantry Brigade
- 99th Indian Infantry Brigade
- 100th Indian Infantry Brigade
- British 16th Infantry Brigade
- 21st (East Africa) Infantry Brigade

3rd Anti-Tank Regiment, Royal Indian Artillery, now 8 Field Regiment (India) was also part of the division.
