= Francis Nosworthy =

British Army Lieutenant General (1887-1971)

Lieutenant-General Sir Francis Nosworthy KCB DSO* MC*
- Born: 21 September 1887; Jamaica
- Died: 9 July 1971 (aged 83)
- Military career
- Allegiance: United Kingdom
- Branch: British Army
- Service years: 1907–1945
- Rank: Lieutenant-General
- Service number: 4180
- Unit: Royal Engineers
- Commands: West Africa Command (1943–45); IX Corps (1942); IV Corps (1940–41); 5th Infantry Brigade (1935–38)
- Conflicts: First World War; Third Anglo-Afghan War; Second World War
- Awards: Knight Commander of the Order of the Bath; Distinguished Service Order & Bar; Military Cross & Bar; Mentioned in Despatches; Croix de Guerre (France)

Lieutenant-General Sir Francis Poitiers Nosworthy, KCB, DSO & Bar, MC & Bar (21 September 1887 – 9 July 1971) was a British Army officer who served as Commander-in-Chief of West Africa Command during the Second World War.

== Military career ==
Educated at Exeter School and the Royal Military Academy, Woolwich, Nosworthy was commissioned into the Royal Engineers in 1907.

He took part in the Abor and Mishmi expedition to India in 1912 and served in the First World War as a General Staff Officer in France. He became the 66th Division's GSO1 in March 1918, and was granted the temporary rank of lieutenant colonel while so employed.

After taking part in the Third Anglo-Afghan War in 1919, he attended the Staff College, Quetta from 1919 to 1920, and was appointed second-in-command of the Sudan Defence Force in 1926, followed by attendance at the Imperial Defence College in 1931, he commanded the 5th Infantry Brigade at Aldershot Command in 1935. He commanded the brigade until 12 January 1938 when he relinquished command and was placed on half-pay. He became Deputy Chief of the General Staff at Army Headquarters in India in 1938.

Nosworthy served in the Second World War becoming General Officer Commanding (GOC) IV Corps from May 1940, receiving a promotion to lieutenant-general. After the Norwegian campaign ended, the corps commanded most of the armoured reserves preparing to face the proposed German invasion of Britain (Operation Sea Lion), while the other corps headquarters that had been evacuated from Dunkirk in Operation Dynamo was reorganised. Under Nosworthy's command IV Corps was envisaged as a counter-attack force. He continued as GOC IX Corps in Tunisia from 1942 and as Commander-in-Chief of West Africa Command from 1943. He retired in February 1945.

== Bibliography ==
- Alanbrooke, Field Marshal Lord (2001). Danchev, Alex; Todman, Daniel (eds.). War Diaries 1939–1945. Phoenix Press. ISBN 1-84212-526-5.
- Smart, Nick (2005). Biographical Dictionary of British Generals of the Second World War. Barnesley: Pen & Sword. ISBN 1844150496.

Military offices
Preceded by Claude Auchinleck	GOC IV Corps; 1940–1941	Succeeded by Thomas Corbett
Preceded by Edwin Morris	GOC IX Corps; February–September 1942	Succeeded by John Crocker
Preceded by George Giffard	GOC West Africa Command; 1943–1945	Succeeded by Brocas Burrows
