= Francis Tuker =

British Indian Army officer

Lieutenant-General Sir Francis Tuker KCIE CB DSO OBE
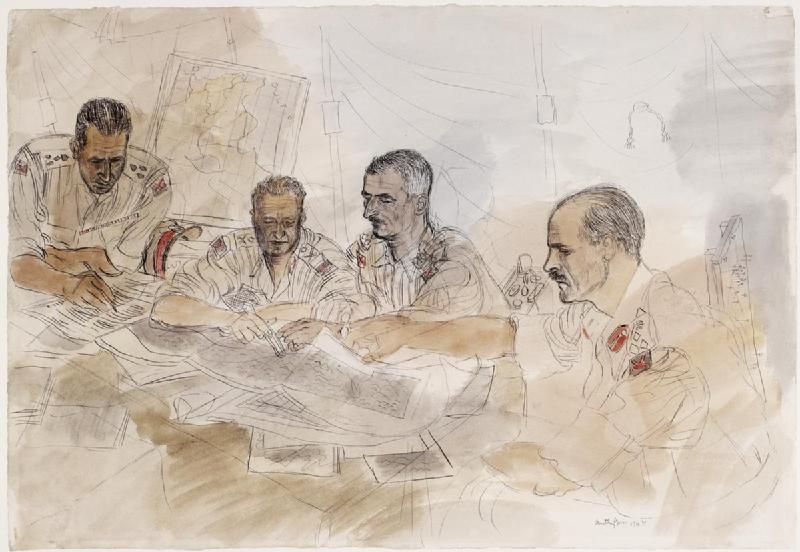
- Tuker, far right, with three other senior officers in a military tent studying maps in the North African desert near El Alamein, June 1943
- Born: 4 July 1894; Tobago, Trinidad and Tobago
- Died: 7 October 1967 (aged 73); Mawnan South, Cornwall, England
- Military career
- Allegiance: United Kingdom
- Branch: British Army; British Indian Army
- Service years: 1914–1948
- Rank: Lieutenant-General
- Nickname: "Gertie"
- Service number: 282035
- Units: Royal Sussex Regiment; 2nd Gurkha Rifles
- Commands: 1st Battalion, 2nd Gurkha Rifles; 34th Indian Infantry Division; 4th Indian Infantry Division; IV Corps; Eastern Command, India
- Conflicts: First World War; Second World War
- Awards: Knight Commander of the Order of the Indian Empire; Companion of the Order of the Bath; Distinguished Service Order; Officer of the Order of the British Empire
- Other work: Writer, Military Historian

Lieutenant-General Sir Francis Ivan Simms Tuker KCIE CB DSO OBE (4 July 1894 – 7 October 1967) was a senior British Indian Army officer who commanded the 4th Indian Infantry Division during the Second World War from 1941.

During the Italian campaign he was one of the officers involved in debates over whether to bomb the historic Monte Cassino Abbey in 1944, which was eventually completely destroyed.

== Early life ==
The son of William J. Sanger Tuker, of Butts Green Hall, Sandon, Essex, by his marriage to Katherine Louisa Simms, of Yew House, Twickenham, Tuker was educated at Brighton College, East Sussex, of which he was in later life a governor, and attended the Royal Military College, Sandhurst, from 1912 to 1913.

== Military career ==
After being commissioned as a second lieutenant into the Royal Sussex Regiment in January 1914, later that year Tuker transferred to the 2nd Gurkha Rifles of the Indian Army, in which he was commissioned as a second lieutenant on 10 October. He saw active service in the First World War, which had begun two months before, and served as an acting captain from 14 March to 12 April 1916, and was promoted to the substantive rank of lieutenant on 17 August 1917, back-dated to 1 September 1915. Promoted to captain on 14 January 1918, he took part in the Kuki Punitive expedition that year and, after the war, was an officer of the North West Persia operations between 1920 and 1921.

After attending the Staff College, Camberley from 1925 to 1926, Tuker was promoted to major on 14 January 1932, brevetted to lieutenant colonel on 1 July 1933, and promoted to lieutenant colonel on 1 February 1937, at which time he was appointed Commanding Officer (CO) of the 1st Battalion, 2nd Gurkha Rifles. For his part in operations in Waziristan that year, he was appointed an OBE (Mil.) on 21 December and was mentioned in dispatches in February 1938.

On 27 October 1939, a month after the outbreak of the Second World War, Tuker was promoted to full colonel (with seniority from 1 July 1936). He became Director of Military Training in India in 1940. A temporary brigadier by this time, he was appointed General Officer Commanding (GOC) 34th Indian Infantry Division on 1 October 1941 with the acting rank of major-general. He took over command of the 4th Indian Infantry Division on 30 December 1941 and then commanded it during the Western Desert and Italian campaigns.

Promoted to temporary major-general on 1 October 1942, he was mentioned in dispatches on 15 December 1942 and again on 24 June 1943. Promoted to major-general on 31 May 1943, he was appointed a CB on 5 August 1943.

In early 1944, towards the end of Tuker's time in Italy as GOC 4th Indian Infantry Division, during the Battle of Monte Cassino, Allied commanders were engaged in a controversy regarding what action should be taken against the monastery at Monte Cassino. The Germans had declared it a military-free zone but many senior commanders were reluctant to believe that the Germans would not occupy such a strategically important position. Tuker had found a book dated 1879 in a Naples bookshop giving details of the construction of the monastery at Monte Cassino which his division was to attack. He wrote a memorandum to his corps commander, Lieutenant-General Bernard Freyberg, concluding that it should be demolished to prevent its occupation. He also pointed out that with 150-foot (46 m) high walls made of masonry at least 10 feet (3.0 m) thick, there was no practical means for field engineers to deal with the place, and that bombing with blockbuster bombs would be the only solution since 1,000 pound bombs would be "next to useless". General Sir Harold Alexander, commanding the Allied Armies in Italy, agreed to the bombing (which did not employ blockbuster bombs) and the ruins were occupied by German forces which held the position until 18 May. Following the war, the abbot of the monastery and other monks said that German troops had not occupied the inside of the abbey and it was not being used for military purposes.

Tuker commanded the 4th Indian Division until 4 February 1944 when he became seriously ill and for nearly a year took no part in the war. While recovering he assumed light duties as General Officer Commanding, Ceylon from March 1944 to September 1944, before becoming Chairman of the Frontier Commission in India. On 14 July 1945 he was put in temporary command of the IV Corps in Burma while Lieutenant-General Frank Messervy took leave for a month, taking part in the defeat of the Japanese at the Battle of the Sittang Bend a breakout attempt at the Sittang in July and August. For his service in Burma he received his final mention in dispatches in September 1946.

Tuker reverted to his substantive rank of major-general and after taking some leave, became Commander, Lucknow District in November 1945. Knighted with the KCIE in the 1946 New Year Honours, he was promoted once more to acting lieutenant-general on 21 January and appointed General Officer Commanding-in-Chief, Eastern Command, India. Promoted to the permanent rank of lieutenant-general on 15 November 1946, he retired on 25 April 1948 and died in 1967. There is a memorial tablet to him in the chapel of Brighton College, below which hangs his sword. At its dedication ceremony, the Band of the Brigade of Gurkhas performed a Beating Retreat on the school's playing field.

Tuker, nicknamed "Gertie" when he was in the army, is known for a number of books on military history that he wrote, including The Pattern of War, While Memory Serves and The Yellow Scarf. In his book The Pattern of War he argued that warfare follows a definite pattern.

== Private life ==
In 1923 Tuker married Catherine Isabella Bucknall, in the district of Horsham, Sussex. She died in Cornwall on 2 October 1947 and was buried at St Mawnan and St Stephen's Church, Mawnan. In 1948, in Marylebone, Tuker married secondly Cynthia H. Fawcett.

Tuker's father died on 26 January 1951, aged eighty-nine, when he was still living at Butts Green, Sandon, Essex.

In his book Approach to Battle (1963), Tuker commented on his career: "I have tried my hand at many other things in my life - farming, commercial horticulture, authorship, training horses, painting, etching and engraving, and none have I found so testing and so difficult as the planning and conduct of a successful land battle against a worthy foe, whether against the guerrilla or the enemy who is fully equipped for war."

== Publications ==
- Tuker, Francis (1944). The Desert Rats and Other Verses. Falmouth: F. S. Tuker. OCLC 500713544.
- ——— (1948). The Pattern of War. London: Cassell. OCLC 1692323.
- ——— (1950). While Memory Serves. London: Cassell. OCLC 776589922.
- ——— (1952). Does Stalin Mean War. London: Batchworth Press. OCLC 753039478.
- ——— (1957). Gorkha: The Story of the Gurkhas of Nepal. London: Constable. OCLC 468954732.
- ——— (1961). The Yellow Scarf: The Story of the Life of Thugee Sleeman or Major-General Sir William Henry Sleeman, 1788-1856, of the Bengal army and the Indian Political Service. London: J. M. Dent. OCLC 578826920.
- ——— (1963). Approach to Battle, a Commentary: Eighth Army, November 1941 to May 1943. London: Cassell. OCLC 654634176.
- Metcalfe, Henry; Edmonstone, John (1953). Tuker, Francis (ed.). The Chronicle of Private Henry Metcalfe, H.M. 32nd Regiment of Foot, together with Lt. John Edmondstone's Letter to His Mother of 4th Jan., 1858. London: Cassell. OCLC 562472964.

== Bibliography ==
- Majdalany, Fred (1957). Cassino: Portrait of a Battle. London: Longmans, Green. OCLC 536746.
- Mead, Richard (2007). Churchill's Lions: a biographical guide to the key British generals of World War II. Stroud (UK): Spellmount. ISBN 978-1-86227-431-0.
- Smart, Nick (2005). Biographical Dictionary of British Generals of the Second World War. Barnesley: Pen & Sword. ISBN 1844150496.

Military offices
Preceded by Tim Inskip	GOC 34th Indian Infantry Division; 1941–1942	Succeeded by ??
Preceded by Frank Messervy	GOC 4th Indian Infantry Division; 1941–1944	Succeeded by Alexander Galloway
Preceded by Sir Frank Messervy	GOC IV Corps; July–August 1945	Succeeded by Corps disbanded
Preceded by Sir Arthur Smith	GOC-in-C Eastern Command, India; 1946–1947	Succeeded by Command disbanded
