= Brocas Burrows =

British Army Lieutenant General (1894-1967)

Lieutenant-General Brocas Burrows CB DSO MC
- Burrows in 1946
- Born: 31 October 1894; Reigate, Surrey, England
- Died: 17 January 1967 (aged 72); Marylebone, London, England
- Military career
- Allegiance: United Kingdom
- Branch: British Army
- Service years: 1914–1946
- Rank: Lieutenant-General
- Service number: 17658
- Unit: 5th Dragoon Guards
- Commands: West Africa Command (1945–1946); 11th Armoured Division (1942–1943); 2nd Armoured Group (1942); 9th Armoured Division (1940–1942); 26th Armoured Brigade (1940); 1st Motor Machine Brigade (1940)
- Conflicts: First World War; Russian Civil War; Second World War
- Awards: Companion of the Order of the Bath; Distinguished Service Order; Military Cross; Mentioned in Despatches (2)

Lieutenant-General Montagu Brocas Burrows, CB, DSO, MC (31 October 1894 – 17 January 1967) was a British Army officer who served in both world wars and became Commander-in-Chief of West Africa Command from 1945 to 1946.

== Early life ==
Montagu Brocas Burrows was born on 31 October 1894 in Reigate, Surrey, the son of Stephen Montagu Burrows and Isabella Christina (née Cruickshank). He was educated at Eton College and the University of Oxford.

== Military career ==
Burrows was commissioned as a second lieutenant into the 5th Dragoon Guards, British Army in 1914. He served in the First World War and became a prisoner of war during the Great Retreat. Burrows was deployed to the Murmansk coast with the North Russia Expeditionary Force during the Russian Civil War in 1918. In the 1920s he played cricket for Surrey County Cricket Club.

Burrows remained in the army and continued to serve during the interwar period; he became adjutant at Oxford University Officers' Training Corps in 1920, was promoted to captain on 1 May that year, and became an instructor at the Royal Military College, Sandhurst, in 1922. After attending the Staff College, Camberley from 1925 to 1926, he became brigade major with the Nowshera Infantry Brigade in India in 1928, before taking over from Willoughby Norrie as brigade major of the 1st Cavalry Brigade at Aldershot in April 1930. He was on the General Staff at the War Office from 1935 to 1938, when he became the military attaché in Rome.

Burrows also served in the Second World War, initially still as a military attaché in Italy, before returning to the United Kingdom in May 1940 and, after being promoted to the acting rank of brigadier, was given command of the 1st Motor Machine Gun Brigade, which became the 26th Armoured Brigade in October. Soon afterwards, he became General Officer Commanding (GOC) of the new 9th Armoured Division, for which he was promoted to acting major general on 1 December 1940. He remained in command of the division until March 1942, when he was succeeded by Major General Brian Horrocks. During this period he led Brocforce comprising the 9th Battalion, East Surrey Regiment, two companies of artillery and a Pioneer battalion. After becoming GOC of the 2nd Armoured Group in South-Eastern Command, he was subsequently GOC 11th Armoured Division from October 1942 to December 1943 before being appointed Head of the British Military Mission to the Soviet Union in 1944. After the war Burrows became General Officer Commanding-in-Chief of West Africa Command; he retired in 1946.

== Personal life ==
On 5 April 1932, at St Margaret's, Westminster, Burrows married Molly Rose Le Bas, of Bryanston Square, a notable sculptor and daughter of Edward Le Bas, an iron and steel merchant.

Burrows died on 17 January 1967 in Marylebone, London.

== Bibliography ==
- Daniel, David Scott (1957). The History of the East Surrey Regiment. Vol. IV 1920–1952. London: Ernest Benn. p. 108. OCLC 492800784.
- Smart, Nick (2005). Biographical Dictionary of British Generals of the Second World War. Barnsley: Pen & Sword. ISBN 1844150496.

Military offices
New command	GOC 9th Armoured Division; 1940–1942	Succeeded by Brian Horrocks
Preceded by Richard McCreery	GOC 2nd Armoured Group; March–October 1942	Post disbanded
Preceded by Percy Hobart	GOC 11th Armoured Division; 1942–1943	Succeeded by Philip Roberts
Preceded by Francis Nosworthy	GOC West Africa Command; 1945–1946	Succeeded by Noel Irwin
