= Onkar Singh Kalkat =

Indian military officer

Major General Onkar Singh Kalkat
- Born: 1 February 1918
- Died: 3 December 2004 (aged 86)
- Children: Two daughters and a son
- Military career
- Allegiance: British India; India
- Service/Branch: British Indian Army; Indian Army; Research and Analysis Wing
- Rank: Major General
- Conflicts: Burma 1939-45; Indo-Pakistani War of 1947; Indo-Pakistani War of 1971
- Awards: Param Vishisht Seva Medal; Mentioned in dispatches twice

Major–General Onkar Singh Kalkat, PVSM, (1 February 1918 – 3 December 2004) was an Indian military officer in the British Indian Army and later the Indian Army. Soon after the partition of India in 1947, he stumbled upon the plans for an Operation Gulmarg, which were apparently Pakistani plans to attack the princely state of Kashmir, two months before they were to commence. Even though he conveyed the information to the Indian authorities, he was not taken seriously. Senior Indian officials including the-then Defence Minister of India Sardar Baldev Singh, Brigadier Kalwant Singh and the DGMO, Col. P. N. Thapar, were complicit in the delay in taking action on Kalkat's information. Kalkat's account also shows the complicity of some British officials in the 1947 invasion of Kashmir.

== Early life ==
Onkar Singh Kalkat was a postgraduate in economics from the University of Delhi.

== Military career ==
He joined the British Indian Army at the age of 24 and studied at the Defence Services Staff College. He saw operations in both the Northeast India and Burma between 1938–45, and in Jammu and Kashmir in 1947 and then in 1971 when he was commander of the 14 Infantry, leading the recapture of 32 posts from the Pakistanis. He then worked first as an instructor and then as a Commandant at College of Combat, Mhow. From 1969 till January 1971, he served as Commandant at the Infantry School, Mhow. He opted for voluntary retirement at the age of 54 in 1972. After retirement, for two years, he was the Chief Military Intelligence Officer in the Cabinet Secretariat, Government of India, working under Research and Analysis Wing (R&AW).

=== Pakistan's Invasion Plans ===
At the time of partition of India, Major Kalkat was the Brigade Major of the Bannu Frontier Brigade Group, in present-day Pakistan, under the Command of Brigadier C. P. Murry, a British officer; (Note: Some writers have spelt the name as "Murray". But "Murry" is the spelling used by Kalkat.) who were waiting to go back to India and England, respectively. It was then in August 1947 that Kalkat stumbled upon information related to Pakistan's invasion of Kashmir, Operation Gulmarg, that was to commence in October. Kalkat was authorised to open letters for Brigadier CP Murry in his absence. On 20 August 1947, Kalkat opened one such letter from General Frank Walter Messervy, and found attached the plans for Operation Gulmarg.

Kalkat informed Brigadier Murry of the letter, who in turn told him to tell no one about the information in Pakistan as it could get him killed. However, soon afterwards, Kalkat was put under house arrest by the Pakistani Army suspecting that something was up. Kalkat escaped his captors, left Mir Ali Mirali, reached Ambala in Indian Punjab and, on 18 October 1947, headed to Delhi in a goods train. The following day he met senior military officials including Brigadier Kalwant Singh, Col. P. N. Thapar (then the Director of Military Operations) and Sardar Baldev Singh, the Defence Minister, and told them about what he knew of the impending attack. But no one took Major Kalkat seriously enough to take action and the "British-staffed intelligence directorate paid no heed to it". At that time, the "impending invasion" was being reported from multiple locations.

Before leaving Pakistan, Major Kalkat, with the help of his Muslim friends and the District Commissioner of Mianwali district, had got his family out of Pakistan and sent to India. While Major Kalkat was searching for his family in East Punjab, the Operation Gulmarg began. It was then that the Indian authorities realised their mistake. Major Kalkat was traced only on 24 October. He was taken to Prime Minister Nehru who shouted at everyone for not taking an officer in a responsible position seriously:

I was traced from Amritsar on 24 October 1947 and rushed to Delhi. The next day (25 October 1947) I was rushed to the presence of Pandit Nehru. He listened to me with rapt attention for fifteen minutes. He was most upset.... He blamed them for having remained impervious to my information. Nehru shouted that an officer in responsible position ought to have been trusted, and some action should have been taken on my initial report.

— Major–General Onkar Singh Kalkat (Retd), Far-flung Frontiers (page 37)

In 1983, Kalkat wrote a book called Far-flung Frontiers in which he described his experiences. The foreword of the book was written by Field Marshal Sam Manekshaw, then a Brigadier, who agreed with Kalkat's narrative.

== Publications ==
First published in 1983, The Far-Flung Frontiers by Major-General O.S. Kalkat is said to be one of the most "significant" military autobiographies written in India "in terms of military value and the scope it covers".

== See also ==
- G. K. Reddy
