= Frank Messervy =

British Army general (1893–1974)

Sir Frank Messervy KCSI KBE CB DSO & Bar
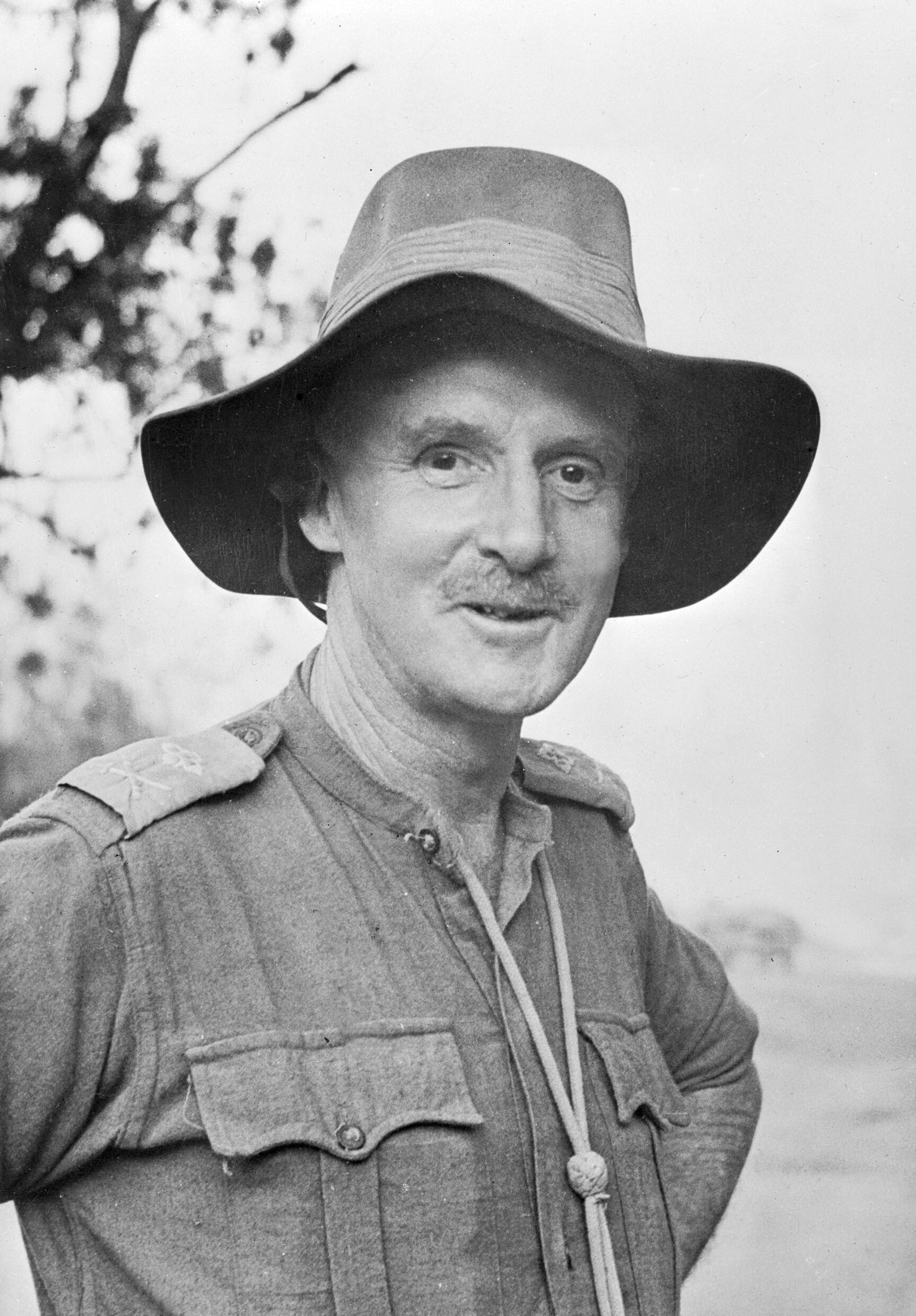
- Messervy as the GOC of the 7th Indian Infantry Division during the Second World War
- Born: 9 December 1893; Trinidad
- Died: 2 February 1974 (aged 80); Heyshott, West Sussex, England
- Education: Eton College; Sandhurst Military College
- Military career
- Allegiance: United Kingdom; Dominion of Pakistan
- Branch: British Indian Army (1913–1947); Pakistan Army (1947–1948)
- Service years: 1913—1948
- Rank: General
- Nickname: "The Bearded Man" (Note: So-called due to his tendency to forego shaving during periods of action.)
- Units: 9th Hodson's Horse
- Commands: Commander-in-Chief of the Pakistan Army (1947–1948); Northern Command, India; Malaya Command; IV Corps; 7th Indian Infantry Division; 43rd Indian Armoured Division; 7th Armoured Division; 1st Armoured Division; 4th Indian Infantry Division
- Conflicts: First World War; Second World War; India–Pakistan war of 1947–1948
- Awards: Knight Commander of the Order of the Star of India; Knight Commander of the Order of the British Empire; Companion of the Order of the Bath; Distinguished Service Order & Bar; Mentioned in Despatches (3); Order of the Nile (Egypt); Legion of Merit (United States)

General Sir Frank Walter Messervy, KCSI, KBE, CB, DSO & Bar (9 December 1893 – 2 February 1974) was a British military officer who served as the first Commander-in-Chief of the Pakistan Army from 1947 to 1948. Prior to Pakistan's independence, he served in the British Indian Army in the First and Second World Wars, and as the General Officer Commanding-in-Chief for Northern Command of British India in 1946 and 1947.

== Early life and education ==
Messervy was born in Trinidad on 9 December 1893, the oldest child of Walter John Messervy (born in Jersey in the English Channel), a bank manager in the colony (and later England) and his wife Myra Naida de Boissiere from Trinidad.

Sent to England from Trinidad, Messervy was initially educated at Eton College and the Royal Military College, Sandhurst, and was commissioned into the Indian Army in January 1913

== Military career ==
In 1914 Messervy joined 9th Hodson's Horse. which later became part of the 4th Duke of Cambridge's Own Hodson's Horse. He would see action in the First World War in France, Palestine and Syria from 1914 to 1918. He later served in Kurdistan in 1919.

After attending the Staff College, Camberley, from 1925 to 1926, Messervy was appointed as an instructor at the Staff College, Quetta from 1932 to 1936, where Bernard Montgomery was among his fellow instructors. He was made commanding officer of the 13th Duke of Connaught's's Own Lancers, then in British India, during 1938 and 1939.

=== Second World War ===
==== East Africa ====
In September 1939, Messervy was promoted to colonel and became a General Staff Officer Grade 1 (GSO1) of the 5th Indian Infantry Division, which was about to be formed at Secunderabad. In mid-1940, the division was sent to the Sudan to counter the threat from the Italian forces based in Italian East Africa. Messervy was appointed commander of Gazelle Force. Created on 16 October 1940, it was a mobile reconnaissance and strike formation of expanded battalion size created from elements of 5th Indian Division. During the ensuing East African campaign, Messervy commanded Gazelle Force with notable success, latterly attached to the Indian 4th Infantry Division. By 13 February 1941, the campaign had become static and Messervy's formation was disbanded.

In early March 1941, Messervy was promoted acting brigadier to command the Indian 5th Infantry Division's 9th Indian Infantry Brigade and played a significant role in the third Battle of Keren during the second half of March 1941. His promotion was in part related to his actions during the advance from Kassala through Agordat to the early fighting at Keren during February.

When Major-General Noel Beresford-Peirse, then commander of the 4th Indian Infantry Division, was promoted to command XIII Corps in North Africa Messervy, a brigadier for only six weeks, was appointed to take his place. He was promoted to the acting rank of major general as a result of his new appointment.

==== Western Desert – North Africa ====
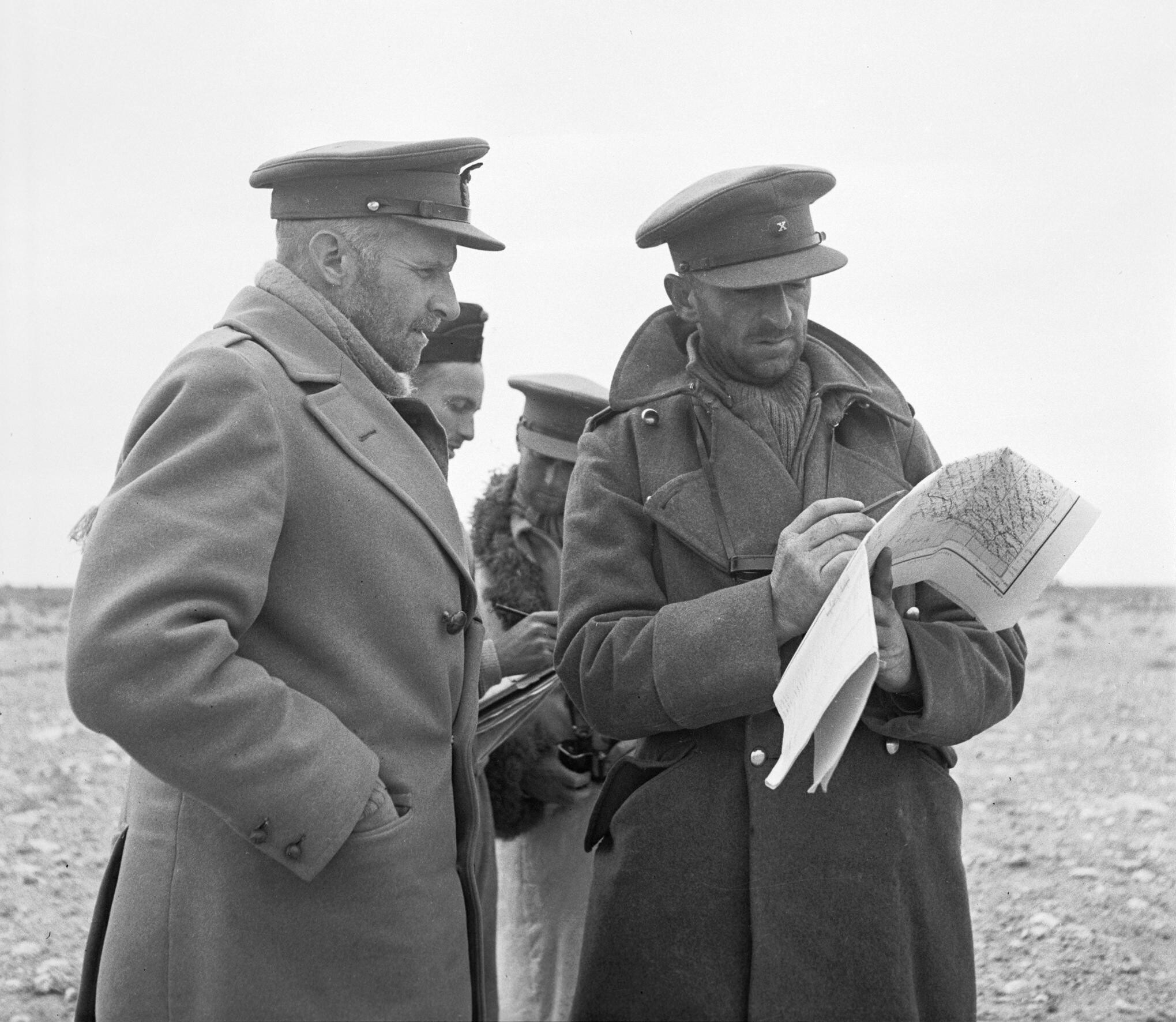
Messervy, unshaved, giving orders south-west of Gazala.

Messervy took his division to North Africa in April 1941, taking part in Operation Battleaxe in June. During Operation Crusader in November that year, 4th Indian Division, dug in on the Egypt–Libya border, played a key role in repelling Rommel's tanks after they had defeated the British armour at Sidi Rezegh. The division's battle groups took part in the Eighth Army's pursuit when Rommel withdrew from his defensive positions at Gazala in December, ending the year at Benghazi.

In early January 1942 Messervy had received orders to depart for India where he would assume command of the 31st Indian Armoured Division. He was instead appointed to replace Major General Herbert Lumsden, the wounded commander of the 1st Armoured Division which had recently arrived in the desert. During Rommel's attack from El Agheila in late January 1942, the division was outmatched by the Axis armour and heavily defeated. Upon Lumsden's return in March, Messervy was moved to command the 7th Armoured Division ("The Desert Rats") which had just lost its newly appointed commander, Major General Jock Campbell, who had been killed in a motor accident, shortly after being awarded the Victoria Cross (VC). This made Messervy the only Indian Army officer to command a British Army division during the Second World War.

When division HQ was overrun by the Germans at the start of the Battle of Gazala, Messervy was captured on 27 May 1942; but, removing all insignia, managed to bluff the Germans into believing he was a batman and escaped with other members of his staff to rejoin division HQ the following day.

Messervy knew little about tanks and was not considered a great success commanding armoured divisions by his superiors. He was dismissed from command of 7th Armoured Division by Eighth Army commander Neil Ritchie in late June 1942 following the severe defeat the division had sustained at the Battle of Gazala. He transferred to Cairo as Deputy Chief of General Staff, GHQ Middle East Command 1942 and was sent to India a few months later to raise 43rd Indian Armoured Division as its commander. Originally intended for service in Persia, the division was disbanded in April 1943 when the threat to Persia was removed by the Soviet victory at Stalingrad.

==== India and Burma ====
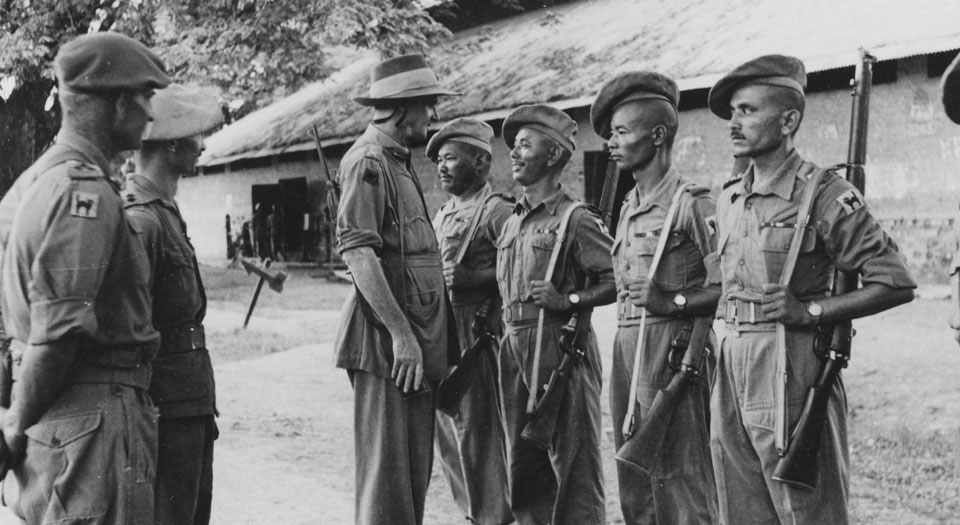
Lieutenant-General Frank Messervy, GOC IV Corps in Burma, talks to a sepoy from the 17th Indian Infantry Division, December 1944. (Note: This division was sometimes known as 'The Black Cat Division' due to its formation badge, which are clearly visible on the shoulders of the men on parade.)

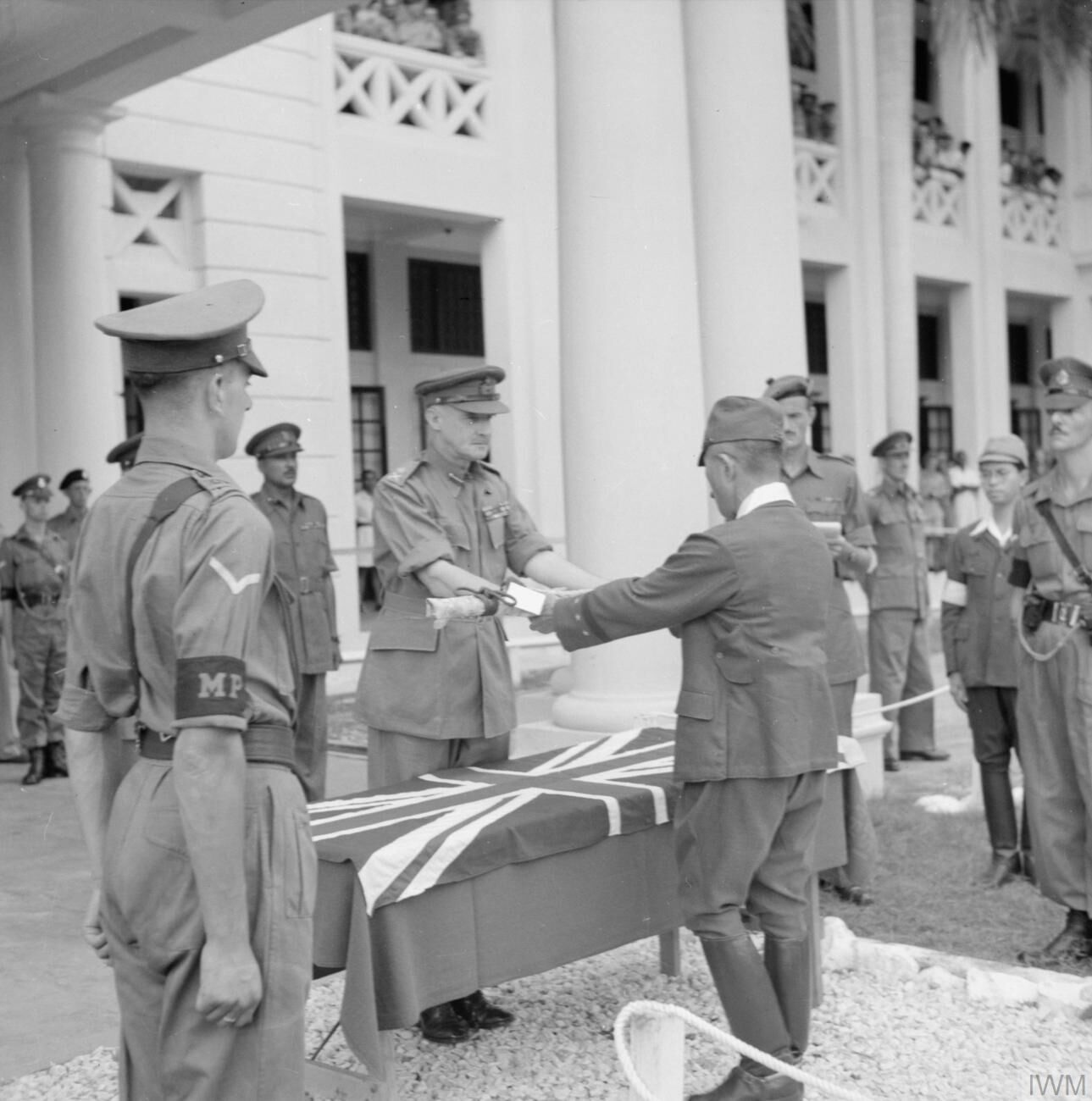
Lieutenant-General Sir Frank Messervy receives the sword of General Seishirō Itagaki, commander of the Japanese Seventh Area Army, at a formal ceremony of surrender held in the grounds of HQ Malaya Command, Kuala Lumpur, 22 February 1946.

Much to his horror, Messervy was then made Director of Armoured Fighting Vehicles, General Headquarters, India, in 1943, where he argued successfully against the then prevailing view that anything other than light tanks could not be used in Burma. This was to have a significant impact in the next two years when medium tanks were used to telling effect against the Japanese.

In July 1943, Messervy was appointed GOC of the 7th Indian Infantry Division, in succession to Major-General Thomas Corbett, which, although an improvement above his old position, was not initially greeted with much enthusiasm by the division's officers, who all admired Corbett.

The division had been created some three years before Messervy's assumption of command and originally contained many professional soldiers in its ranks. However, many of these men had been, in the usage of the day, "milked" to help create other new units then being formed in the huge expansion of the Indian Army, with the situation being so severe that the division had at one point resembled a training formation rather than a combat division. This all changed in the summer of 1942 when serious training began to take place and which started to absorb the many lessons learned from fighting in the jungle and the Japanese. This would serve the division well when it did enter combat the following year.

The division was sent to the Arakan in Burma to join XV Corps in September. In the Japanese offensive in February 1944, despite having his headquarters overrun and scattered and his supply lines compromised, Messervy's brigades conducted a successful defence whilst being supplied by air (Battle of the Admin Box). After going on the attack in late February, 7th Indian Division was relieved in mid-March.

In March 1944, Messervy lost two brigades sent to reinforce the hard-pressed defences at Imphal and Kohima in India. By May, the whole division was back in the front line in the Kohima sector, fighting a key five-day battle at the Naga Village. It then advanced towards the Chindwin river, combining with Indian 20th Infantry Division to inflict a heavy defeat on the Japanese at Ukhrul.

In December 1944, Messervy was appointed to command IV Corps, which he led in the 1945 offensive during which, he captured the key communications centre at Meiktila in Burma and advanced to Rangoon between February and April. When Messervy returned from home leave hostilities had ceased. He was made Commander-in-Chief Malaya Command in 1945 after the Japanese surrender.

=== Pakistan and Kashmir ===
Close to the Partition of India, Messervy was made General Officer Commanding-in-Chief Northern Command, India from 1946 to 1947. Finally when Pakistan came into being on 14 August 1947, he was appointed as the Commander-in-Chief of the Pakistan Army.

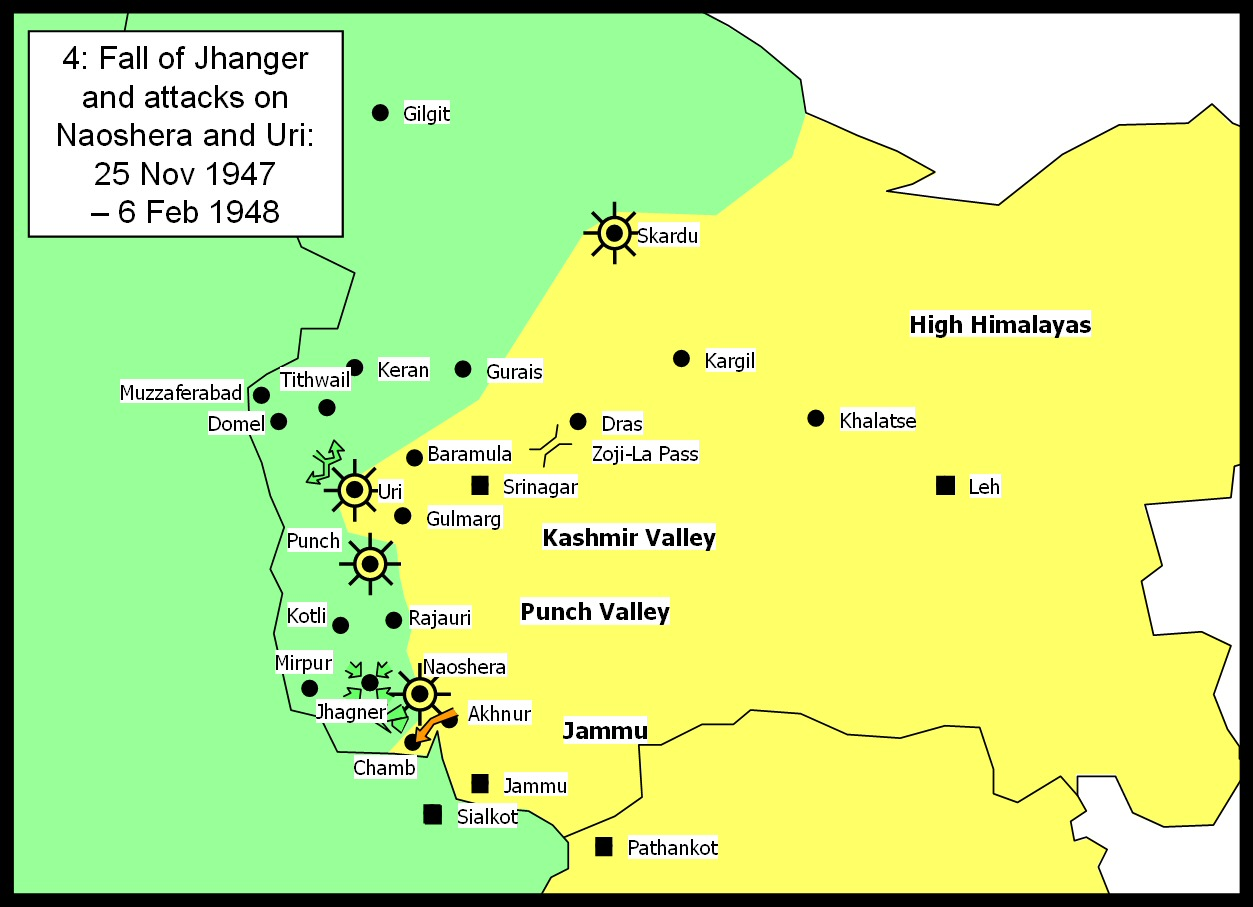
Fighting in Kashmir at the time of Messervy's retirement

On 20 August, a letter signed by Messervy went out to all the brigade headquarters in northwest Pakistan, attaching plans for a certain Operation Gulmarg. According to the plan, 20 lashkars of Pashtun tribesmen were to be armed and trained in various brigade locations in northwest Pakistan for an armed invasion of Kashmir. The information leaked out, one of the letters having fallen into the hands of an Indian officer Major Onkar Singh Kalkat. Kalkat was put under house arrest, but he escaped and made his way to India. By the D-day of 22 October, when the attack was launched, Messervy was away in London, leaving General Douglas Gracey, the Chief of Staff, as the Acting Commander-in-Chief On his return, he stopped in Delhi, where Lord Mountbatten made him swear that he had not been asked for, nor had he provided, any help to the tribesmen. But within a week he was found providing arms and ammunition to the Pakistani invading forces. He complained to Governor George Cunningham of the NWFP that Mountbatten had gone over to the side of the "Hindus". (Note: Cunningham had been aware, from his Governor's position, of the efforts to mobilise the Pasthun tribes. He had alerted Messervy, who apparently promised to warn Liaquat Ali Khan about the inadvisability of such an operation.)

Pakistani officers narrate that both Messervy and Gracey were involved in running the day-to-day operations of Pakistan's Kashmir War. Officers were loaned out for commanding the rebel forces and shown on records as being absent. Nevertheless, Messervy issued a statement on 12 November 1947, denying that any "serving Pakistan Army officers are directing operations in Kashmir", which was cited by Pakistan in the UN Security Council debates as proof of Pakistan's innocence.

Messervy was relieved of his post on 15 February 1948, leading to his retirement on 22 August that year. He was granted the honorary rank of general. Later, he wrote an influential article on Kashmir in the Asiatic Review, where he alleged that India had planned to militarily intervene in Kashmir several weeks before the event. He opined that if the pro-India National Conference party was allowed to hold power in Kashmir, India would likely win a plebiscite, but if Pakistan was allowed to hold on to the areas that it had captured, a Pakistan win was 'even more certain'. He had 'few doubts' as to which dominion most people of Kashmir would choose. Historian Gowher Rizvi states that influences of this kind persuaded the Secretary of State for Commonwealth Affairs Philip Noel-Baker to ensure that Pakistan's viewpoint was "not ignored" in the UN Security Council.

Messervy died at home in the small village of Heyshott, in the south of England, on 2 February 1974.

== Family ==
In 1927 Messervy married Patricia Waldegrave Courtney daughter of Lt Col Edward Arthur Waldegrave Courtney. They had a daughter and two sons.

== Career ==
- Commissioned into the British Indian Army (1913)
- Commissioned into the 9th Hodson's Horse (1914)
- Brigade Major – (1928–1932)
- Instructor (GSO2) at Command and Staff College, Quetta (1932–1936)
- Commanding Officer, 13th Duke of Connaught's Own Lancers (1938–1939)
- General Staff Officer 1, Indian Infantry Division, East Africa (1939–1941)
- Commanding Officer Gazelle Force, Sudan and Eritrea (1940–1941)
- Commanding Officer, 9th Indian Brigade, Ethiopia (1941)
- General Officer Commanding, Indian Infantry Division, North Africa (1941–1942)
- General Officer Commanding, 1st Armoured Division, North Africa (1942)
- General Officer Commanding, 7th Armoured Division, North Africa (1942)
- Deputy Chief of the General Staff, HQ Middle East Command (1942)
- General Officer Commanding, Indian 43rd Armoured Division (1942–1943)
- Director Armoured Fighting Vehicles, India (1943)
- General Officer Commanding, 7th Indian Infantry Division, India (1943–1944)
- General Officer Commanding, IV Corps, Burma (1944–1945)
- General Officer Commander-In-Chief, Malaya Command (1945–1946)
- General Officer Commander-In-Chief, Northern Command, India (1946–1947)
- Commander-in-Chief of the Pakistan Army (1947–1948)
- Retired (1948)

== Promotions ==
- Second Lieutenant-22 January 1913
- Lieutenant – 22 April 1915
- Captain – 22 January 1917
  - Acting Major – 23 November to 27 December 1918
  - Brevet Major – 1 July 1929
- Major – 22 January 1931
  - Local Lieutenant-Colonel – 1 September 1932
  - Brevet Lieutenant-Colonel – 1 July 1933
- Lieutenant-Colonel – 10 April 1938
- Colonel – 19 April 1940
  - Acting Major-General (Temporary Brigadier) – 14 April 1941
  - Temporary Major-General – 14 April 1942
- Major-General – 17 April 1943
  - Acting Lieutenant-General – 8 December 1944
- Lieutenant-General – 1 June 1945
  - Acting General – 15 August 1947
- Honorary General – 1948

== Bibliography ==
- Brett-James, Antony (1951). Ball of fire – The Fifth Indian Division in the Second World War. Gale & Polden. p. 481 pages. Archived from the original on 27 March 2020.
- Callahan, Raymond (2007). Churchill and His Generals. University Press of Kansas. ISBN 978-070061512-4.
- Holland, James (2016). Burma '44. Bantam Press.
- Mackenzie, Compton (1951). Eastern Epic. Chatto & Windus, London. p. 623 pages.
- Maule, Henry (1961). Spearhead General: The Epic Story of General Sir Frank Messervy and His Men in Eritrea, North Africa and Burma. Odhams Press, 1961.
- Mead, Richard (2007). Churchill's Lions: a biographical guide to the key British generals of World War II. Stroud: Spellmount. ISBN 978-1-86227-431-0.
- Smart, Nick (2005). Biographical Dictionary of British Generals of the Second World War. Barnsley: Pen and Sword Books. ISBN 1844150496.

Military offices
Preceded by Noel Beresford-Peirse	GOC 4th Indian Infantry Division; 1941–1942	Succeeded by Francis Tuker
Preceded by Herbert Lumsden	GOC 1st Armoured Division; January–February 1942	Succeeded by Herbert Lumsden
Preceded by John Campbell	GOC 7th Armoured Division; March–June 1942	Succeeded by James Renton
Preceded by Thomas Corbett	GOC 7th Indian Infantry Division; 1943–1945	Succeeded by Geoffrey Evans
Preceded by Sir Geoffry Scoones	GOC IV Corps; 1944–1945	Succeeded by Sir Francis Tuker
Preceded by Sir Miles Dempsey	GOC Malaya Command; 1945	Succeeded by Sir Alexander Galloway
Preceded by Sir Richard O'Connor	GOC-in-C Northern Command, India; 1946–1947	Command disbanded
New title	C-in-C of the Pakistan Army; 1947–1948	Succeeded by Douglas Gracey
