= 8 Field Regiment (India) =

Indian Army artillery unit

- Active: 1941 – present
- Country: India
- Allegiance: British India; India
- Branch: British Indian Army; Indian Army
- Type: Artillery
- Size: Regiment
- Mottos: SARVATRA, IZZAT-O-IQBAL (Everywhere With Honour and Glory), SHOOR VEER AHIR (Brave Ahir warrior)
- Colors: "Red & Navy Blue"
- Decorations: Order of British India, First Class 1 Order of British India, Second Class 1 George Medal 1 Role of Honour 3 PVSM 7 AVSM 5 Vir Chakra 1 VSM 3 Shaurya Chakra 2 Sena Medal 3 Mention in Despatches 17; GOC in C Unit Citation 2 COAS Commendation Card 5 VCOAS Commendation Card 1 GOC-in-C Commendation Card 17.

Insignia
- Abbreviation: 8 Fd Regt

8 Field Regiment is an artillery regiment which is part of the Regiment of Artillery of the Indian Army.

== Initial establishment ==
The regiment was raised on November 1, 1941 at Secunderabad as 3rd Anti Tank Regiment by Lt Col J.H.H. Willans, RA. The class composition was Ahirs and Punjabi Muslims.

== History ==
In 1942, during World War II, the regiment was deployed in Colombo as part of the 34 Infantry Division in Ceylon Garrison. In 1945, the Regiment returned to India and was reorganised as the 8 Field Regiment with pure class composition of Ahirs. The batteries composed of Punjabi Muslims moved to Pakistan. Lt Col KS Sandhu was the first Indian Commanding Officer. During the victory parade held in London in 1946, the Regiment was represented by its first Ahir Subedar Major Shib Sahai, Sardar Bahadur, OBI and three Other ranks.

== Operations ==
Some of the major operations undertaken by the Regiment include:

Partition of India
During the partition, the Regiment helped evacuate around 210 thousand refugees, while deployed in Mianwali and Rawalpindi areas of Pakistan.
Indo-Pakistani War of 1947–1948
The Regiment was supporting an Infantry Division in capturing two important heights in Naushera sector of Jammu and Kashmir.
Indo-Pakistani War of 1971
The Regiment took part in the Western Front in the Shakargarh sector.
Operation Sindoor
The Regiment took part in Poonch Sector of Jammu and Kashmir. The unit was employed in town security and was solely responsible for protecting the city of Poonch during enemy artillery fire. Three soldiers of the unit were awarded with GOC in C Commendation card.

== See also ==
- List of artillery regiments of Indian Army
