= List of public art in Whitehall =

This is a list of public art in Whitehall, a district in the City of Westminster, London.

Whitehall is at the centre of the highest concentration of memorials in the City of Westminster, in which 47% of the total number of such works in the borough are located. It includes the eponymous street of Whitehall and Horse Guards Parade, both important ceremonial spaces, and Horse Guards Road, which forms its western boundary with St James's Park. The area's monuments are mainly military in character, foremost among them being the Cenotaph, which is the focal point of the national Remembrance Sunday commemorations held each year.

Image	Title / subject	Location and coordinates	Date	Artist / designer	Architect / other	Type	Designation	Notes
More images	Bust of Charles I	Banqueting House	c. 1800	Anon.		Bust	Grade I	One of three busts of Charles I found in a builder's yard in Fulham by Hedley Hope-Nicholson, Secretary of the Society of King Charles the Martyr, in 1945. Installed here in 1950. The plaque below is inscribed HIS MAJESTY KING CHARLES I/ PASSED THROUGH THIS HALL AND/ OUT OF A WINDOW NEARLY OVER/ THIS TABLET TO THE SCAFFOLD/ IN WHITEHALL WHERE HE WAS/ BEHEADED ON 20TH JANUARY 1649.
More images	Memorial to the Siege of Cádiz	Horse Guards Road 51°30′15″N 0°07′38″W	1814 (base)	Robert Shipster	—N/a	Memorial	Grade II	Unveiled 12 August 1816. A French mortar from the siege, presented by Spain in thanks for Wellington's lifting of the siege. The mortar is mounted on a figure of the mythological monster Geryon and (at the back) his two-headed dog Orthrus. The support was made by the Carriage Department of the Royal Arsenal to Shipster's design.
	Bust of Charles Dickens	The Red Lion, Parliament Street	1900	Anon.	Gardiner & Theobald	Architectural sculpture	Grade II	Commemorates an occasion in Dickens's boyhood when he visited this pub and asked for a glass of "genuine stunning" ale; he was given one, together with a kiss, by the landlady.
More images	Statue of Prince George, Duke of Cambridge	Whitehall, opposite the Old War Office Building 51°30′19″N 0°07′36″W	1907	Adrian Jones	John Belcher	Equestrian statue	Grade II	Unveiled 15 June 1907. Jones was appointed a Member of the Royal Victorian Order for this work.
More images	Archway	King Charles Street	1908	Paul Raphael Montford and William Silver Frith	John Brydon and Henry Tanner	Architectural sculpture	Grade II*	Montford sculpted the relief panel on the attic storey facing Parliament Street, and the groups of Old Age and Youth flanking it; Frith produced the allegorical figures in the spandrels on both sides of the structure.
More images	Statue of Spencer Cavendish, 8th Duke of Devonshire	Junction of Horse Guards Avenue and Whitehall 51°30′17″N 0°07′34″W	1909–1910	Herbert Hampton	Howard Ince	Statue	Grade II	Unveiled 14 February 1911. The statue of the Duke in his Garter robes stands on a pedestal of Darley Dale stone. Edward VII, as a close friend of the Duke, took a personal interest in the memorial, asking Hampton to bring the modello to Buckingham Palace for his inspection.
More images	Statue of Robert Clive, 1st Baron Clive	King Charles Street, facing Horse Guards Road 51°30′08″N 0°07′45″W	1912	John Tweed	George Somers Clarke	Statue	Grade II	Erected 1912 in the gardens of Gwydyr House; moved to present site in 1916. The statue was the brainchild of Lord Curzon, who felt that Clive had been insufficiently honoured for his role in establishing the British Empire in India. A marble version was also created for erection in Calcutta.
More images	Cenotaph	Whitehall 51°30′10″N 0°07′34″W	1920	Francis Derwent Wood	Edwin Lutyens	Memorial	Grade I	Unveiled 11 November (Armistice Day) 1920 by George V. Lutyens's temporary cenotaph in wood and plaster, designed and built in two weeks in July 1919, proved so popular that this permanent version of the same design was erected the following year. It commemorates the dead of both world wars.
More images	Statue of Garnet Wolseley, 1st Viscount Wolseley	Horse Guards Road 51°30′18″N 0°07′39″W	1920	William Goscombe John	Richard Allison	Equestrian statue	Grade II	Unveiled 25 June 1920 by the Duke of Connaught. Goscombe John was awarded this commission on the strength of his equestrian bronze of Lord Tredegar in Cathays Park, Cardiff. Trafalgar Square was initially considered as the location for this statue. It was stored for safekeeping at Berkhamsted Castle, Hertfordshire, between 1941 and 1949.
More images	Statue of Frederick Roberts, 1st Earl Roberts	Horse Guards Road 51°30′16″N 0°07′39″W	1924	Henry Poole after Harry Bates	Richard Allison	Equestrian statue	Grade II	Unveiled 30 May 1924 by the Duke of Connaught. A scaled-down replica of Bates's 30-foot high bronze of Lord Roberts, erected in Calcutta in 1896. Another, earlier replica by Poole is in Kelvingrove Park, Glasgow.
More images	Royal Naval Division War Memorial	Horse Guards Road 51°30′19″N 0°07′44″W	1925	Eric Broadbent and F. J. Wilcoxson	Edwin Lutyens	Fountain with obelisk	Grade II*	Unveiled 25 April 1925 by Winston Churchill. Inscribed with words from the poem "1914. III. The Dead" by Rupert Brooke, who served in the RND. Put into storage 1939, re-erected outside the Old Royal Naval College at Greenwich in 1959, and returned to its original site in 2003.
More images	Statue of Herbert Kitchener, 1st Earl Kitchener	Horse Guards Road 51°30′14″N 0°07′41″W	1926	John Tweed	—N/a	Statue	Grade II	Unveiled 9 June 1926 by the Prince of Wales. Set against a stone screen abutting the garden wall of 10 Downing Street. A larger national memorial to Kitchener, the tomb designed by William Reid Dick, had been erected in St Paul's Cathedral the previous year.
More images	Guards Division War Memorial	Horse Guards Parade 51°30′16″N 0°07′46″W	1926	Gilbert Ledward	H. Chalton Bradshaw	Memorial with sculpture	Grade I	Unveiled 16 October 1926. The bronze figures represent five individual soldiers from the Grenadier, Coldstream, Scots, Irish and Welsh Guards; they were cast from captured German guns. After it sustained bomb damage in the Blitz, Ledward asked that some of the "honourable scars of war" be left on the memorial.
More images	Statue of Douglas Haig, 1st Earl Haig	Whitehall 51°30′15″N 0°07′35″W	1937	Alfred Frank Hardiman	Stephen Rowland Pierce	Architectural sculpture	Grade II*	Unveiled 10 November 1937. The statue aroused great controversy, comparable even with the reaction to Jacob Epstein's early works. The depiction of the horse was deemed to be unnatural; Country Life noted that its legs were in the position for urinating.
More images	Earth and Water	Horse Guards Avenue, outside Ministry of Defence Main Building	1949–1952	Charles Wheeler	Vincent Harris	Architectural sculpture	Grade I	Carved from 40 tons of Portland stone. Corresponding sculptures of Fire and Air (completing the set of four elements) were originally intended for the building's southern entrance, but were vetoed by the Treasury.
	Agriculture and Sea and Fisheries	3 Whitehall Place	c. 1952	James Woodford	C. E. Mee	Architectural sculpture	Grade II*	
More images	Statue of Bernard Montgomery, 1st Viscount Montgomery of Alamein	Whitehall, outside the Ministry of Defence 51°30′12″N 0°07′33″W	1980	Oscar Nemon	—N/a	Statue	—N/a	Unveiled 6 June 1980 by the Queen Mother. The texture of the lower parts of the statue was achieved by mixing old plaster from the studio floor with fresh plaster at the modelling stage. Another cast stands in Brussels, at a traffic intersection called Montgomery Square.
More images	Statue of Louis Mountbatten, 1st Earl Mountbatten of Burma	Mountbatten Green, off Horse Guards Road 51°30′13″N 0°07′43″W	1983	Franta Belsky	Charles Pollard (Lettering by David Kindersley)	Statue	—N/a	Unveiled 2 November 1983 by Elizabeth II. The statue stands on a pedestal at the centre of a low stepped pyramid, a scheme much reduced in ambition from Belsky's competition-winning design which included fountains representing the four seas. The financial constraints and "a very restrictive brief" resulted in a finished work which dissatisfied the sculptor.
More images	Statue of William Slim, 1st Viscount Slim	Whitehall, outside the Ministry of Defence 51°30′14″N 0°07′33″W	1990	Ivor Roberts-Jones	David Kindersley (lettering)	Statue	—N/a	Unveiled 28 April 1990 by Elizabeth II. Roberts-Jones had fought in the Burma Campaign of World War II, in which Slim was a commander.
More images	Statue of Alan Brooke, 1st Viscount Alanbrooke	Whitehall, outside the Ministry of Defence 51°30′13″N 0°07′33″W	1993	Ivor Roberts-Jones	David Kindersley (lettering)	Statue	—N/a	Unveiled 25 May 1993 by Elizabeth II. For the installation of this, the last of the statues of Field Marshals on what was formerly called Raleigh Green, the area was re-configured by the landscape architects RMJM and the statue of Sir Walter Raleigh removed to Greenwich.
More images	Memorial to the Brigade of Gurkhas	Horse Guards Avenue 51°30′18″N 0°07′30″W	1997	Philip Jackson after Richard Reginald Goulden	Cecil Denny Highton	Statue	—N/a	Unveiled 3 December 1997 by Elizabeth II. Modelled on a 1924 sculpture by Goulden in the Foreign Office. The Hong Kong Handover transferred the Gurkhas' headquarters to the United Kingdom, which until that point had no memorial to the brigade.
More images	Royal Tank Regiment Memorial	Whitehall Court 51°30′22″N 0°07′28″W	2000	Vivien Mallock after George Henry Paulin	Christopher Rainsford for HOK International	Sculptural group	—N/a	Unveiled 13 June 2000 by Elizabeth II. The group depicts the five-man crew of a World War II-era Comet tank; it is an enlarged version of Paulin's statuette of 1953 in the Tank Museum, Bovington, Dorset. Mallock's husband had been an officer in the RTR in the 1960s.
More images	Monument to the Women of World War II	Whitehall 51°30′13″N 0°07′34″W	2005	John W. Mills	Giles Quarme	Plinth with reliefs	—N/a	Unveiled 9 July 2005 by Elizabeth II. Around the plinth are reliefs of servicewomen's clothing and protective costumes, appearing as if they have been hung up at the end of a working day.
More images	Memorial to the 2002 Bali bombings	Horse Guards Road, rear of the Foreign and Commonwealth Office 51°30′09″N 0°07′46″W	2006	Martin Cook	Gary Breeze	Memorial	—N/a	Unveiled 12 October 2006, the fourth anniversary of the bombings, by the Prince of Wales and the Duchess of Cornwall. The memorial consists of a granite globe carved with 202 doves—one for each individual killed in the bombings—and a wall inscribed with their names.

== Foreign, Commonwealth and Development Office ==
Image	Title / subject	Location and coordinates	Date	Artist / designer	Architect / other	Type	Designation	Notes
	America	Whitehall façade (spandrel on first storey)		Henry Hugh Armstead		Relief		
	Australasia	Whitehall façade (spandrel on first storey)		Henry Hugh Armstead		Relief		
	Africa	Whitehall façade (spandrel on first storey)		Henry Hugh Armstead		Relief		
	Asia	Whitehall façade (spandrel on first storey)		Henry Hugh Armstead		Relief		
	Europe	Whitehall façade (spandrel on first storey)		Henry Hugh Armstead		Relief		
	Captain James Cook	Whitehall façade (roundel in lunette on second storey)		Henry Hugh Armstead or John Birnie Philip		Relief		
	Sir John Franklin	Whitehall façade (roundel in lunette on second storey)		Henry Hugh Armstead or John Birnie Philip		Relief		
	William Wilberforce	Whitehall façade (roundel in lunette on second storey)		Henry Hugh Armstead or John Birnie Philip		Relief		
	David Livingstone	Whitehall façade (roundel in lunette on second storey)		Henry Hugh Armstead or John Birnie Philip		Relief		
	Sir Francis Drake	Whitehall façade (roundel in lunette on second storey)		Henry Hugh Armstead or John Birnie Philip		Relief		
	Elizabeth I	Whitehall façade (roundel in lunette on second storey)		Henry Hugh Armstead or John Birnie Philip		Relief		
	Alfred the Great	Whitehall façade (roundel in lunette on second storey)		Henry Hugh Armstead or John Birnie Philip		Relief		
	Edward the Confessor, an Angel and Christianity	Whitehall façade (roundel in lunette and surrounding spandrels on second storey)		Henry Hugh Armstead or John Birnie Philip		Relief		
	Æthelberht of Wessex	Whitehall façade (roundel in lunette on second storey)		Henry Hugh Armstead or John Birnie Philip		Relief		
	Adam Smith	Whitehall façade (roundel in lunette on second storey)		Henry Hugh Armstead or John Birnie Philip		Relief		
	Sinclair	Whitehall façade (roundel in lunette on second storey)		Henry Hugh Armstead or John Birnie Philip		Relief		
	Sir Francis Bacon	Whitehall façade (roundel in lunette on second storey)		Henry Hugh Armstead or John Birnie Philip		Relief		
	Sir Joshua Reynolds	Whitehall façade (roundel in lunette on second storey)		Henry Hugh Armstead or John Birnie Philip		Relief		
	Edward Grey, 1st Viscount Grey of Fallodon	North façade	1937	William Reid Dick	Edwin Lutyens	Relief		

== Old War Office Building ==
Image	Title / subject	Location and coordinates	Date	Artist / designer	Architect / other	Type	Designation	Notes
	Sorrow of Peace and Winged Messenger of Peace	Whitehall façade		Alfred Drury	William Young and Clyde Young			
	Horrors of War and Dignity of War	Whitehall façade		Alfred Drury	William Young and Clyde Young			
	Truth and Justice	Whitehall Place façade		Alfred Drury	William Young and Clyde Young			
	Victory and Fame	Horse Guards Avenue façade		Alfred Drury	William Young and Clyde Young			

== See also ==
- Equestrian statue of Charles I, Charing Cross, which faces down Whitehall

== Bibliography ==
- Blackwood, John (1989). London's Immortals: The Complete Outdoor Commemorative Statues. London and Oxford: Savoy Press. ISBN 978-0951429600.
- Bradley, Simon; Pevsner, Nikolaus (2003). London 6: Westminster. The Buildings of England. London and New Haven: Yale University Press. ISBN 978-0-300-09595-1.
- Gleichen, Lord Edward (1973). London's Open-Air Statuary. Bath: Cedric Chivers Ltd.
- Hughson, David (1817). Walks through London. Vol. 1. London: Sherwood, Neely & Jones.
- Kershman, Andrew (2013). London's Monuments. London: Metro Publications.
- Matthews, Peter (2018). London's Statues and Monuments. Oxford: Shire Publications. ISBN 978-1-78442-256-1.
- Smith, Richard (2015). A Fitting Tribute: The debate over the memorial to Viscount Grey of Fallodon. London: Foreign & Commonwealth Office.
- Ward-Jackson, Philip (2011). Public Sculpture of Historic Westminster: Volume 1. Public Sculpture of Britain. Vol. 14. Liverpool: Liverpool University Press. ISBN 978-1-84631-691-3.
- Westminster City Council. Statues and Monuments in Westminster: Guidance for the Erection of New Monuments Supplementary Planning Document (PDF).
