= Statue of Earl Kitchener, London =

Statue in London, England

Herbert Kitchener, 1st Earl Kitchener
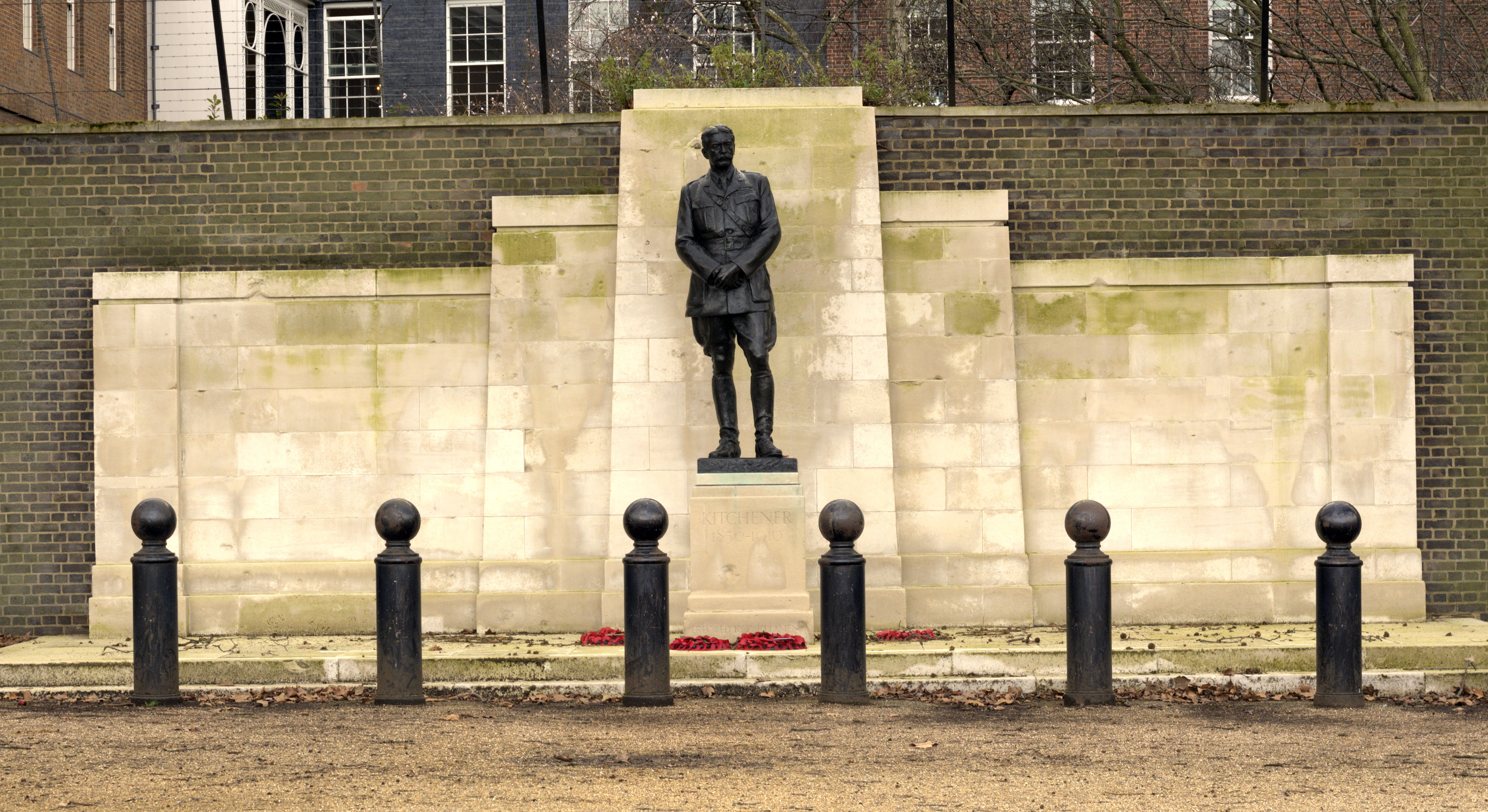
- The statue in 2015
- Artist: John Tweed
- Year: 1926
- Type: Bronze statue
- Location: Horse Guards Parade; London, SW1 United Kingdom; 51.5039°N 0.1280°W

The statue of Earl Kitchener is an outdoor bronze statue by John Tweed depicting Herbert Kitchener, 1st Earl Kitchener, installed in 1926 and located on the south side of Horse Guards Parade in London, England. The sculpture stands on a Portland stone plinth. It became a Grade II listed building in 1970.

Calls for a national memorial to Kitchener began immediately after his death, but there were considerable delays while a suitable site was located, with suggestions including Grosvenor Gardens, or St Paul's Cathedral, or the Royal Exchange, before the Office of Works and King George V approved a site on the south side of Horse Guards Parade, next to the north wall of the Garden of 10 and 11 Downing Street. The project was entrusted to sculptor John Tweed and architect Reginald Blomfield, but Blomfield withdrew when his proposal for a tall plinth, raising the statue above the wall, was rejected by the Prime Minister Lloyd George on grounds of cost.

Tweed's larger than life size bronze statue was cast by A. B. Burton at his Thames Ditton Foundry. It portrays Kitchener in his army uniform, with bare head, standing with left foot advanced, and hands clasped. The statue contrasts with the equestrian statues of Field Marshal Wolseley and Field Marshal Roberts that had already been installed on the east side of Horse Guards Parade in 1920 and 1924 respectively.

The statue is mounted on a Portland stone base and platform, facing north across Horse Guards Parade. The plinth contains the following inscription: KITCHENER/ 1850–1916/ ERECTED BY PARLIAMENT. Behind the statue is a stone screen, against the north face of the wall of the Garden of 10 and 11 Downing Street.

The memorial was unveiled on 9 June 1926 by the Prince of Wales (later Edward VIII). It was favourably compared with a similar standing statue of General Gordon, which stood in Trafalgar Square from 1888 to 1943, and was reinstalled at Victoria Embankment Gardens in 1953.
