= Statue of Lord Mountbatten, London =

Statue in Whitehall, London, England

Statue of Lord Mountbatten
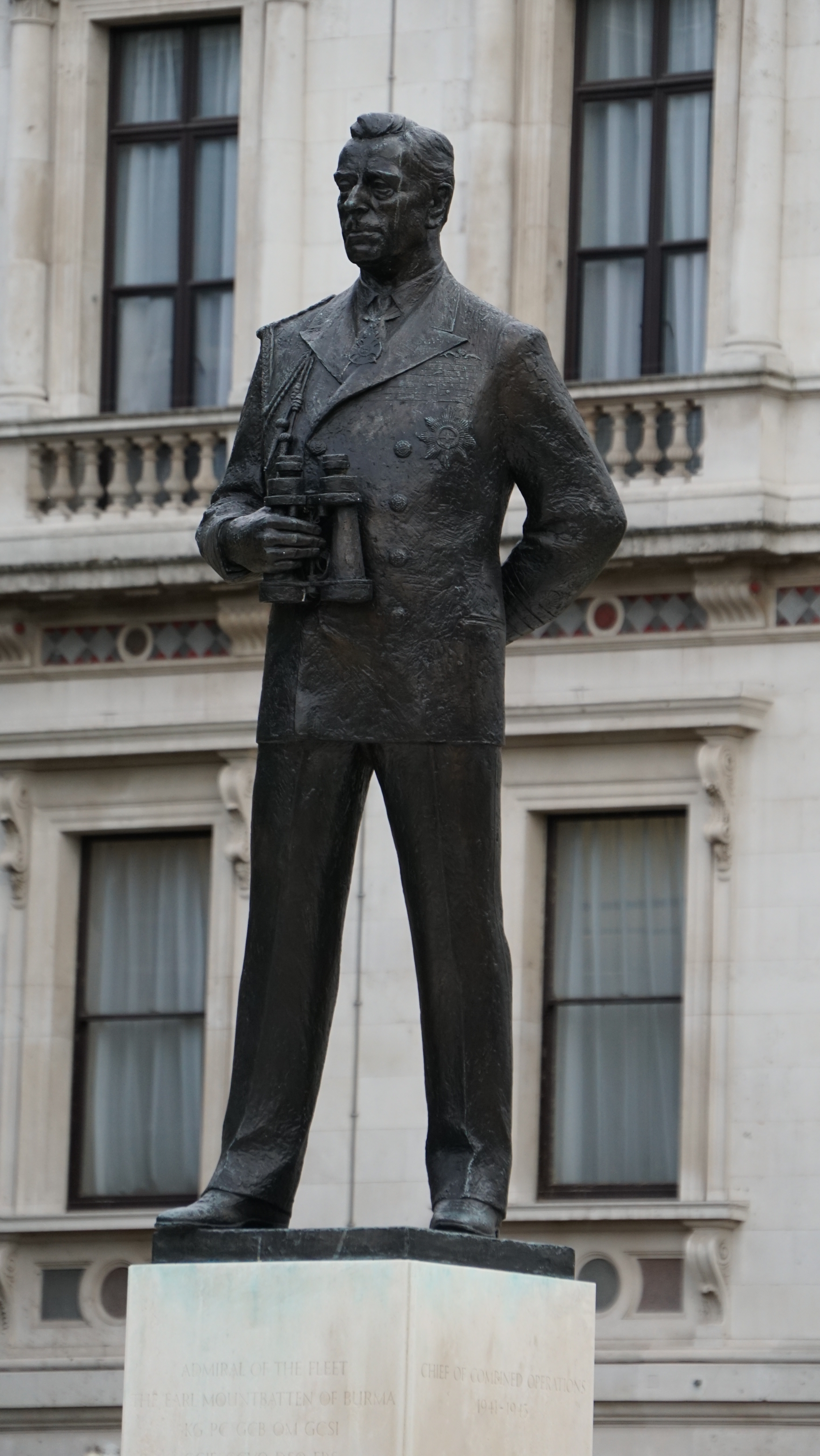
- The statue in 2016

- Location within Greater London
- Artist: Franta Belsky
- Year: 1983
- Medium: Bronze sculpture
- Subject: Lord Mountbatten
- Dimensions: 2.7 m (8.9 ft)
- Location: Mountbatten Green, London; 51.503607°N 0.12866°W

A bronze statue of Admiral of the Fleet Louis Mountbatten, 1st Earl Mountbatten of Burma is located on Mountbatten Green, off Horse Guards Road, Whitehall, London, England. The sculptor was Franta Belsky and the work was cast by the Meridian Bronze Foundry. The memorial was unveiled on 2 November 1983.

== Description ==
The larger than life size statue stands 2.7 m (8 ft 10 in) high and depicts Lord Mountbatten in his admiral's uniform, displaying his honours including the Order of the Garter and the Order of Merit, and holding binoculars in his right hand. Hidden in the left leg of the statue is a jam jar containing coins, press cuttings and details of the sculptor's commission. The inscription on the north side of the plinth gives Lord Mountbatten's retiring rank, title, honours and year of birth and death: "ADMIRAL OF THE FLEET / THE EARL MOUNTBATTEN OF BURMA / KG PC GCB OM GCSI / GCIE GCVO DSO FRS / 1900–1979". The inscription on the west side lists several of the official positions he held during and after the Second World War: Chief of Combined Operations (1941–1943) and Supreme Allied Commander in South East Asia (1943–1946), the last Viceroy of India (1947) and first Governor-General of India (1947–1948), First Sea Lord (1955–1959) and Chief of the Defence Staff (1959–1965).

The bronze statue was erected on a small open area on the north side of the junction of Downing Street and Horse Guards Road, to the west of the Garden of 10 and 11 Downing Street. It is mounted on a Portland stone plinth, on a stone base with four steps, with the standing figure of Mountbatten facing north across Horse Guards Parade towards the Old Admiralty Building. The green where the statue stands was formerly known as Foreign Office Green but latterly as Mountbatten Green. Public access to the green was prohibited due to security concerns in 2001.

== History ==
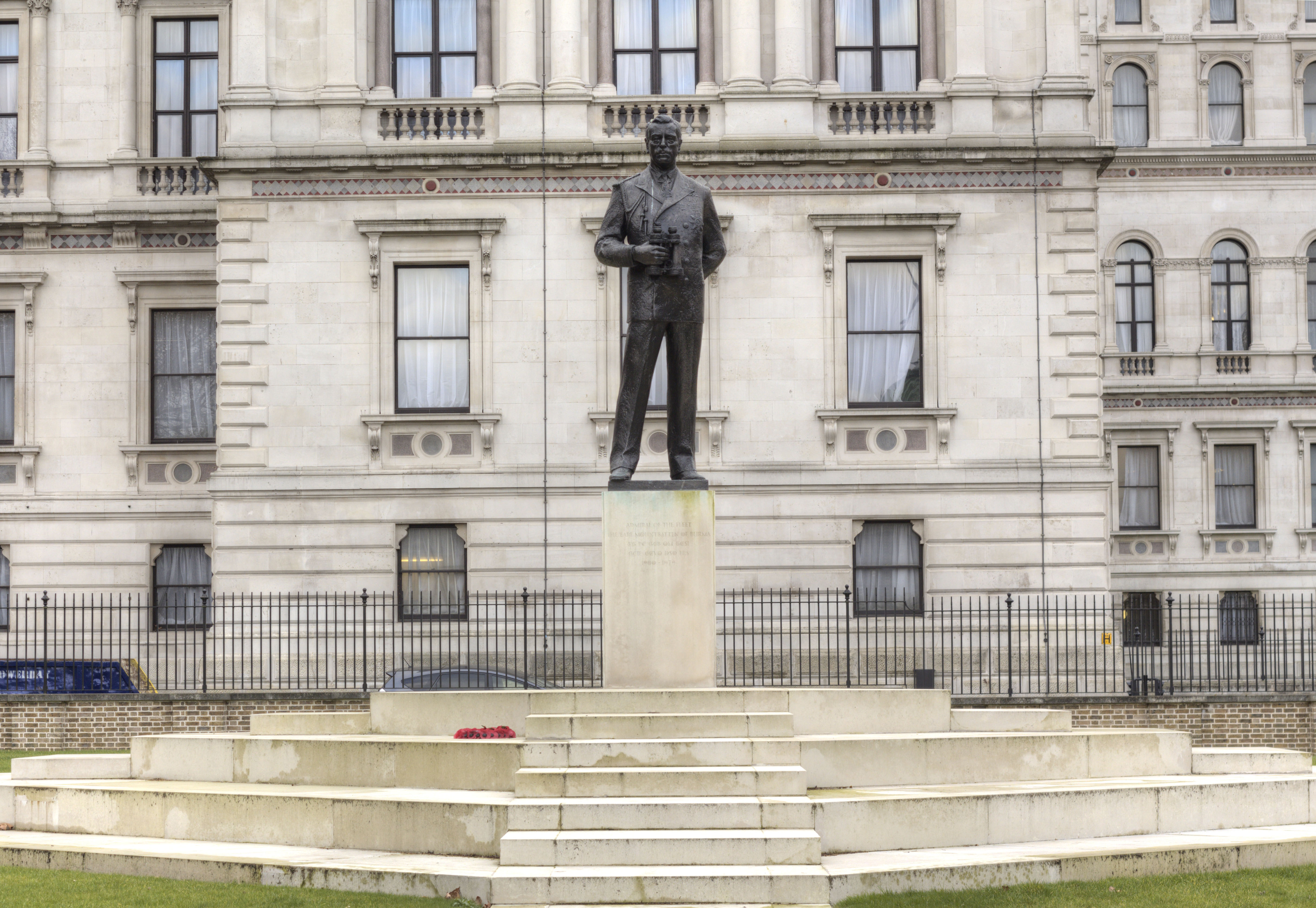
The statue in 2014

Mountbatten was assassinated in August 1979 by a bomb planted aboard his fishing boat in Mullaghmore, County Sligo, Ireland, by members of the Provisional Irish Republican Army. Calls for a memorial to Mountbatten began in the Letters pages of The Times in November 1979; in July 1981 a further letter in support of the proposal was published, which was signed by the Prime Minister Margaret Thatcher, leaders of opposition parties and members of the armed forces. The Queen, Elizabeth II, chose the location for the statue and the matter was considered by the government in 1982. The £100,000 for the memorial was raised by public subscription.

The statue was put in place in October 1983 and the area remained under heavy guard until the formal ceremony on 2 November. The Times reported that among the 1500 guests were "most of the British royal family and 13 crowned heads from Europe".

Before the unveiling, Thatcher delivered a speech praising Mountbatten as "A gallant figure, royal, bold, steeped in tradition yet unconventional, [who] served the land he loved, in peace with tireless devotion, in war with supreme bravery." In unveiling the statue, the Queen referred to Lord Mountbatten as "Uncle Dickie" and said:

The vitality and force of his personality combined with an astonishing range of abilities. He could be far-sighted with enormous breadth of vision yet he could also concentrate in the minutest detail of any problem. He was a perfectionist who always mastered his subject.

This was followed by a dedication performed by Gerald Ellison, the Bishop of London.

The ceremony was accompanied by the band and trumpeters from the Life Guards, the band of the Royal Marines, and a guard of honour from HMS Excellent. The ceremony was followed by a reception at the Banqueting House, Whitehall.
