= Admiralty House, London =

Government building in London

Admiralty House
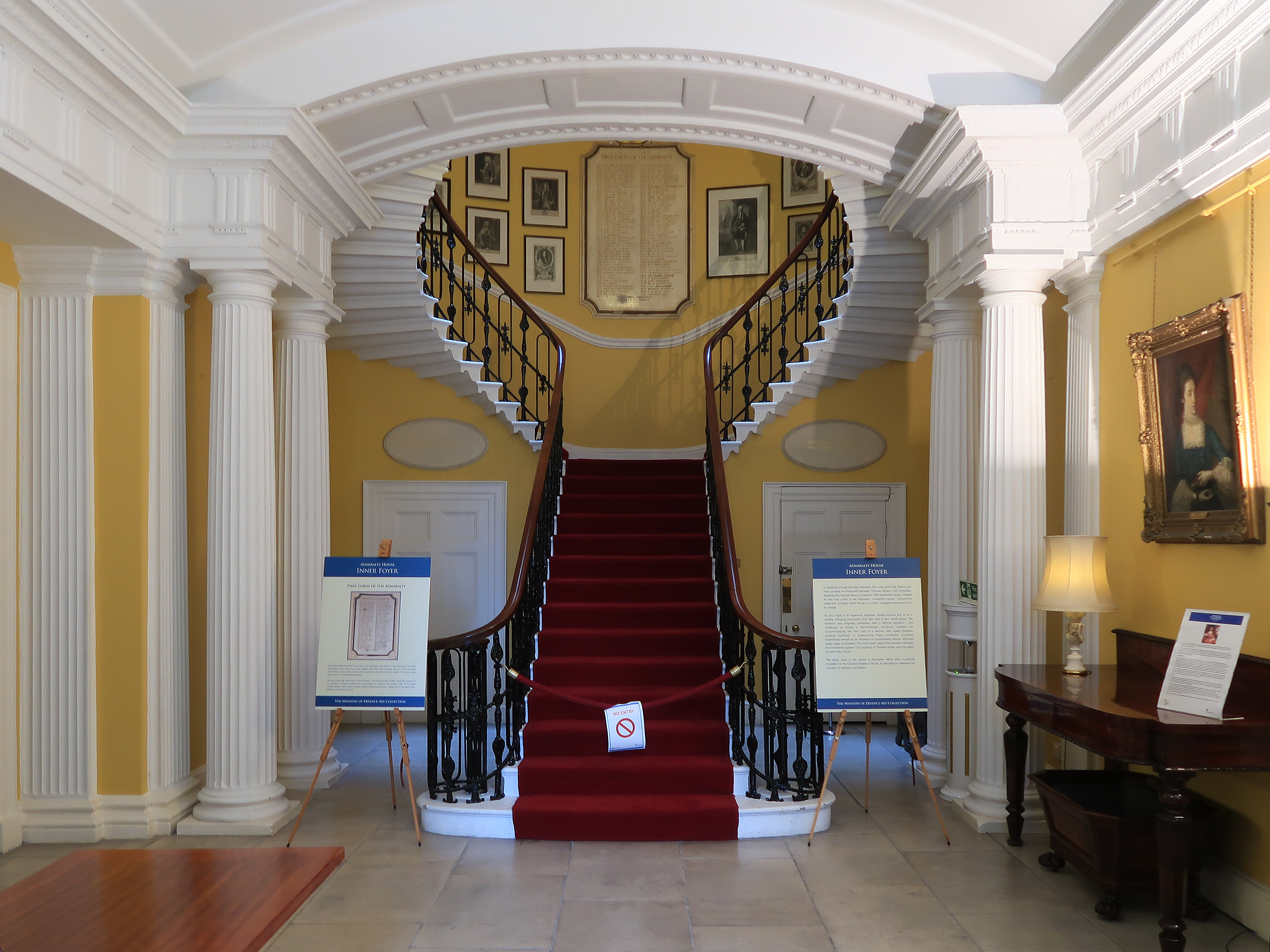
- The staircase hall of Admiralty House

- Location within Central London

General information
- Location: Westminster, Whitehall, London, SW1, United Kingdom
- Coordinates: 51°30′19.8″N 0°7′38.64″W
- Construction started: 1786
- Completed: 1788
- Client: First Lord of the Admiralty
- Owner: His Majesty's Government

Technical details
- Floor count: 3

Design and construction
- Architect: Samuel Pepys Cockerell
- Awards: Grade I listed building

Admiralty House in London is a Grade I listed building facing Whitehall, currently used for government functions and as ministerial flats.

== Description ==
Admiralty House is a four-storey building of yellow brick. The front has a symmetrical facade of three broad bays and one additional small bay at the southern end. The rear facade is of five bays and faces Horse Guards Parade, with a basement-level exit under the corner of the Old Admiralty Building. The front of the house faces Whitehall. It is accessed from the older Ripley Building, to which it is connected.

== History ==
Admiralty House was constructed on the site of two seventeenth-century houses; Walsingham House, the London residence of Lady Walsingham, and Pickering House, residence of Sir Gilbert Pickering.

Admiralty House was designed by Samuel Pepys Cockerell, a protégé of Sir Robert Taylor, and opened in 1788. Built at the request of Admiral of the Fleet Viscount Howe, First Lord of the Admiralty, in 1782–1783 for "a few small rooms of my own", it was the official residence of First Lord of the Admiralty until 1964, and has also been home to several British prime ministers at times when 10 Downing Street was being renovated, in 1991, following the Downing Street mortar attack, John Major temporarily moved to Admiralty House while repairs of the bomb damage.

Winston Churchill lived in the house while serving as First Lord of the Admiralty for two terms, 1911–1915 and 1939–1940. It now contains government function rooms and three ministerial flats.

On some occasions in recent years, the building has been used as a temporary office for those who have become leader of the governing party prior to being appointed Prime Minister, such as Boris Johnson and Liz Truss.

== See also ==
- Admiralty buildings
