= Dominic Cummings scandal =

Events after March 2020 trip to Durham

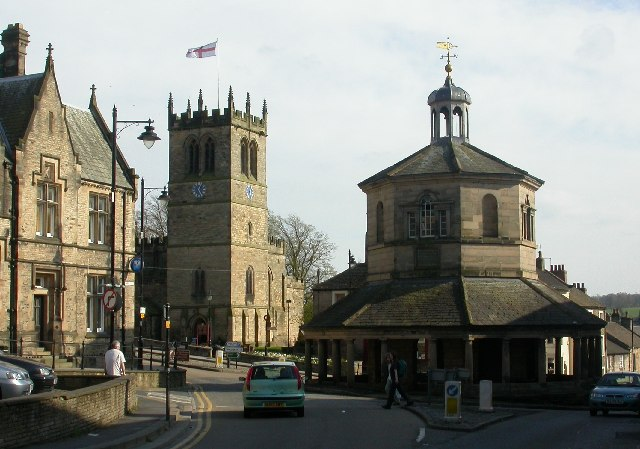
Barnard Castle, a key location in the Cummings scandal

The Dominic Cummings scandal, or the Dominic Cummings affair, was a series of events involving the British political strategist Dominic Cummings during the COVID-19 pandemic in the United Kingdom. The events include at least one journey that Cummings, then chief adviser of Prime Minister Boris Johnson, and his family made from London to County Durham after the start of a national lockdown in March 2020 while they were experiencing symptoms of COVID-19.

Reports of the trip first emerged in May 2020 following investigations by the Daily Mirror and The Guardian. Questions arose about whether the conduct of Cummings and his wife was lawful and appropriate within the framework of government advice and guidance, given that the public were ordered to stay at home, that all non-essential travel was forbidden during the lockdown, and that infected persons had been instructed to self-isolate.

Cummings denied he had broken any rules in a press conference a few days later. Durham Constabulary investigated the trip, concluding there may have been a "minor breach", but did not take any further action. The scandal led to criticism from Members of Parliament (MPs) within and outside the ruling Conservative Party, backlash in the media and from the public, and calls for Cummings to be sacked or to resign. Prominent politicians in the government, including Johnson, rejected these and expressed support for Cummings. Polling suggested that support for the Conservative Party and confidence in the British government's pandemic response fell as a result of the scandal.

== Background ==
=== Cummings ===
On 24 July 2019, Cummings was appointed as a senior adviser to Boris Johnson.

=== Nationwide lockdown ===
On 23 March 2020, Boris Johnson announced immediate wide-ranging restrictions on freedom of movement in the UK in response to the global pandemic of COVID-19. He set out limited reasons upon which people could leave their homes. Self-isolation had already been instructed for those with COVID-19 symptoms, with a proviso giving a tolerance for those living with children. Neil Ferguson had resigned from the government's scientific advisory group on 5 May after it emerged that a woman had been visiting his house in contravention of lockdown rules. Catherine Calderwood, the Chief Medical Officer for Scotland, had also resigned, in April, after she was seen visiting her holiday house.

== Durham visit ==
On 27 March 2020, Johnson announced he had been diagnosed with COVID-19. The same day, Cummings received a phone call at work from his wife, Mary Wakefield, to say that she was feeling ill and had vomited. About an hour after Johnson's announcement, Cummings was seen rushing home from 10 Downing Street. According to Cummings, his wife's condition improved and he returned to work but that night they discussed her situation. Although she did not have a cough or fever he believed that she had caught the virus and that he was likely to catch it too. At that time he was well. They were both worried that they would become too weak to look after their four-year-old son. They drove to Durham that night to stay at a house on his parents' land near to their house and that of his sister. The sister and her daughters had offered to help with the childcare. Cummings, his wife and child arrived at Durham at around midnight. This house was 264 miles (425 kilometres) from his usual residence in London. According to Cummings, he woke up on 28 March with COVID-19-like symptoms, which got worse in that he barely left his bed over the following days. His wife's health improved. He said he experienced a "bad headache and a serious fever".

On 30 March, the government confirmed that Cummings had displayed symptoms of COVID-19 and was self-isolating at home. The report did not mention the trip to Durham. ITV News states that this is when Cummings may have made his trip to Durham. On 2 April, according to Cummings, his son became ill and was taken to hospital by ambulance following medical advice. He was tested for COVID-19 and the result given later was that he was not suffering from the virus. Cummings said he was too ill to go to the hospital, but his wife went. On 3 April, Cummings later said, he went to fetch his wife and son by car, but did not get out of the car as his son had recovered. By 12 April, Cummings was well enough, he said, to return to London. That day the family drove to Barnard Castle (30 miles or 50 kilometres away). Cummings stated this was to test whether he was well enough to drive, having some problems with his eyesight. He left the car at Barnard Castle after feeling sick. On 13 April, along with his family, Cummings travelled back to London.

== Newspaper investigations ==
On 22 May, the Daily Mirror and The Guardian published articles about their joint investigation alleging that the police had spoken to Cummings about breaching the government's lockdown rules in relation to a trip he made to Durham. On 23 May police confirmed that allegation to be untrue, and that they had been asked for security advice by Cummings's father, which they gave in a phone call. On 24 May, The Observer and Sunday Mirror alleged that Cummings had made a second trip to Durham on 19 April during lockdown after returning to, and being photographed in, London, allegations which Cummings denied.

Mary Wakefield, Cummings' wife and a journalist and commissioning editor with The Spectator, wrote an article for the publication on 25 April, in which she described her and her husband's experiences while in lockdown with COVID-19. On the same day, she was a guest on BBC Radio 4's Today to discuss her experience with the virus. However, in neither the article nor the interview did she mention that they had travelled to Durham. Alleged inconsistencies between Cummings' account and his wife's led to two complaints from the public to the Independent Press Standards Organisation (IPSO) over "potential factual inaccuracies" in the article. IPSO declined to investigate.

== Cummings' response ==
=== May 2020 ===
Cummings was filmed leaving his home in London on 23 May while reporters questioned him. He said he had "behaved reasonably and legally", and when asked about how his actions looked, he said "Who cares about good looks? It's a question of doing the right thing. It's not about what you guys think".

On 25 May, Cummings appeared at a press conference in the rose garden of 10 Downing Street, taking questions from the media. He explained his sequence of events and argued "There is no regulation covering the situation I found myself in". He explained that there was a proviso that journeys to facilitate child care counted as necessary and that he believed that this trip to Durham was therefore allowed. He said that he had spoken to Boris Johnson about his decision to travel to Durham at some point leading up to 6 April. He said that due to the condition both he and Johnson were in, "neither of us remember the conversation in any detail". He described experiencing threats of violence which led him to move to an "isolated cottage" on his father's farm as he became concerned about his family's safety.

There were reports of the family being seen in a wood near Houghall, near Durham on 19 April, and elsewhere in the area. Cummings said they were not there, that they were in London and had not returned to Durham, pointing to evidence on his phone which he said proved this.

=== May 2021 ===
On 26 May 2021, Cummings explained to MPs that security threats against his family were the reason they left London. He called his decision to not tell the nation the full story a "terrible misjudgement", and admitted he was wrong for doing so.

== Reactions ==
=== Politicians ===
The Scottish National Party (SNP) leader in Westminster, Ian Blackford, and the acting leader of the Liberal Democrats, Ed Davey, called for Cummings to resign if the allegations were to be confirmed, while the Labour Party said 10 Downing Street needed to provide a "very swift explanation" for his actions.

On 23 May, Downing Street released a statement saying Cummings' journey was essential, and the transport secretary Grant Shapps used part of the televised COVID-19 update to support him. Boris Johnson, as the speaker in next day's COVID-19 update, defended Cummings and said he had acted "responsibly, legally and with integrity". Other government ministers, including Chancellor of the Exchequer Rishi Sunak, Foreign Secretary Dominic Raab and Chancellor of the Duchy of Lancaster Michael Gove, also supported him. Following Johnson's statement of support, "Mr Cummings faced renewed pressure to resign after ministers, MPs, scientific advisers and pro-Conservative newspapers called on Mr Johnson to sack him". Forty-five Conservative Party MPs called for Cummings to resign, and a further fifty-three were critical of his actions, although they did not seek his resignation.

Ex-chairman of the European Research Group (ERG), Conservative MP Steve Baker, said: "The country can't afford this nonsense, this pantomime, Dominic should go and we should move on and deal with things that matter in people's lives." Cummings' press conference in the rose garden of 10 Downing Street was met with scepticism from both the media and the public. The day after he made it, Douglas Ross, the Parliamentary Under-Secretary of State for Scotland, resigned from the government, arguing that his interpretation of the guidelines was "not shared by the vast majority of people". The backbench MP Jeremy Hunt claimed that Cummings had breached the lockdown rules on three occasions, which were a return to work after spending time with his wife when she was ill, and visiting both Durham and Barnard Castle.

=== Opinion polling ===
The crisis saw a sharp fall in support for the Conservatives and rise in support for the Labour Party. A University College London study published in The Lancet found that confidence in the government had decreased from 4.5 out of 7 to 3.5, from the start of the lockdown to after the controversy. This was referred to by researchers as the 'Dominic Cummings effect'. A study from the Office for National Statistics showed a decline in the proportion of the public who believed unity within the country would ensue after the pandemic.

=== Other reactions ===
Two scientists – a former government chief scientific adviser and a professor of behavioural psychology who is member of the government's behavioural scientists advisory body Spi-B – said the trip would make people less likely to comply with government regulations during the pandemic. An academic study published in 2021 reported public anger at events.

A number of Bishops of the Church of England were critical of the way Johnson and Cummings responded to the issue, some of whom later received hate mail.

The former chief crown prosecutor for North West England, Nazir Afzal, whose own brother had died from COVID-19, called for bodies including the Crown Prosecution Service and Metropolitan Police to reopen investigations into Cummings' lockdown movements in early August. Afzal publicly called into question the impartiality of these bodies after his requests for investigations were rejected. Afzal maintains police failed to interview Cummings during their investigation, relying instead on a press conference Cummings had given, which Cummings later admitted had not been entirely accurate. Afzal maintains if Cummings had been investigated properly the partygate scandal might have been avoided.

Lord Sedwill, who served as Cabinet Secretary and Head of the Home Civil Service to Prime Ministers Theresa May and Boris Johnson, said that he believed that Cummings' lockdown trip "undermined" the government's COVID-19 messages. While he said the trip was a "mistake" on Cummings' part, which led to "a difficult moment" for the government, he did not go as so far as to say whether or not Cummings should have resigned over the matter.

During a broadcast of Newsnight about the scandal, host Emily Maitlis opened the programme by saying that "the country can see" that Cummings had "broken the rules", that the public felt "fury, contempt and anguish" and that Cummings had made the public "feel like fools". She went on to say that Johnson had "chosen to ignore it" and "Tonight we consider what this blind loyalty tells us about the workings of Number 10". After reviewing the broadcast, the BBC said that her introduction "did not meet our standards of due impartiality". Media commentators subsequently discovered that historically, the phrase "Barnard Castle" had been slang for a pathetic excuse.

Specsavers noted a 6000% increase in the online mentions of their strapline "Should have gone to Specsavers", largely as a result of people using it in reference to Cummings' assertion that he drove to Barnard Castle to test his eyesight. In response, the optician offered free eye tests to anyone visiting Barnard Castle, with vouchers appearing on the back of parking meter tickets in the local area with the details of their Barnard Castle store.

BrewDog produced a new IPA in May 2020 called "Barnard Castle Eye Test IPA" to "commemorate" the Cummings scandal. The name was voted for by BrewDog's social media followers, with other suggested names including "Cummings & Goings", "260 Miles" and "Stay at Homes". The beer's popularity led to it selling out twice.

== Durham Constabulary investigation ==
On 31 March, Durham Constabulary were "made aware of reports that an individual had travelled from London to Durham and was present at an address in the city". On 1 April, the constabulary spoke to Cummings' father.

On 25 May 2020, Durham's acting police, crime and victims' commissioner, Steve White, asked Durham Constabulary to investigate any potential breach of the law or regulations in relation to Cummings' Durham movements. The constabulary opened an investigation into Cummings' actions the next day.

On 28 May, Durham Constabulary said that they did not consider an offence to have been committed by Cummings in travelling from London to Durham. They also said that a minor breach relating to lockdown rules might have occurred at Barnard Castle, but because there was no apparent breach of the social distancing rules, no action would be taken at that point, stating: "Had a Durham Constabulary police officer stopped Mr Cummings driving to or from Barnard Castle, the officer would have spoken to him, and, having established the facts, likely advised Mr Cummings to return to the address in Durham, providing advice on the dangers of travelling during the pandemic crisis. Had this advice been accepted by Mr Cummings, no enforcement action would have been taken". They also said there was insufficient evidence of a return to the Durham area on 19 April. Out of the four people who claimed to have seen Cummings on this return, two later approached the police watchdog to assert that Durham Constabulary had not fully investigated their claims.

== See also ==
- List of political scandals in the United Kingdom
- The Health Protection (Coronavirus, Restrictions) (England) Regulations 2020
- Partygate
- Oireachtas Golf Society scandal
