= Horse Guards Parade =

Square and parade ground in London

Coordinates: 51.5047°N 0.1283°W

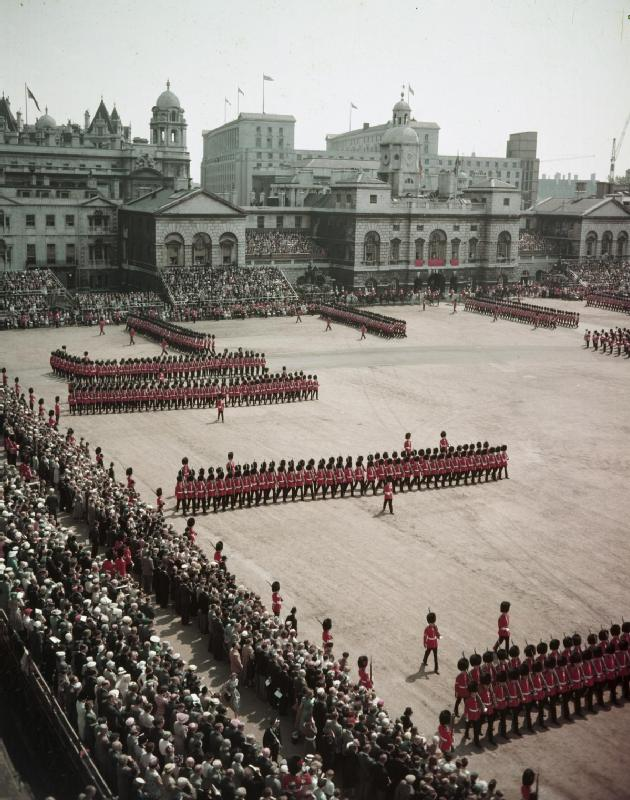
Trooping the Colour at Horse Guards Parade in Whitehall in 1956

Horse Guards Parade is a large parade ground off Whitehall in central London (at grid reference TQ299800). It is the site of the annual ceremonies of Trooping the Colour, which commemorates the monarch's official birthday, and the Beating Retreat.

== History ==
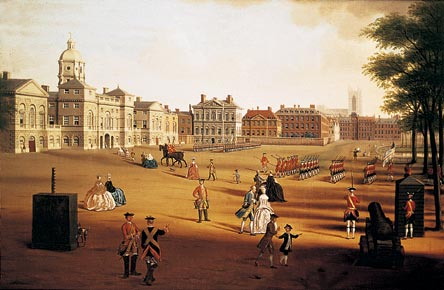
The Coldstream Guards on Parade at Horse Guards, by John Chapman, c. 1755

Horse Guards Parade was formerly the site of the Palace of Whitehall's tiltyard, where tournaments (including jousting) were held in the time of Henry VIII. It was also the scene of annual celebrations of the birthday of Queen Elizabeth I. The area has been used for a variety of reviews, parades and other ceremonies since the 17th century.

The adjacent Horse Guards building was once the Headquarters of the British Army. Arthur Wellesley, 1st Duke of Wellington was based in Horse Guards when he was Commander-in-Chief of the Forces. The current General officer commanding London District still occupies the same office and uses the same desk. Wellington also had living quarters within the building, which today are used as offices.

=== Car park usage ===
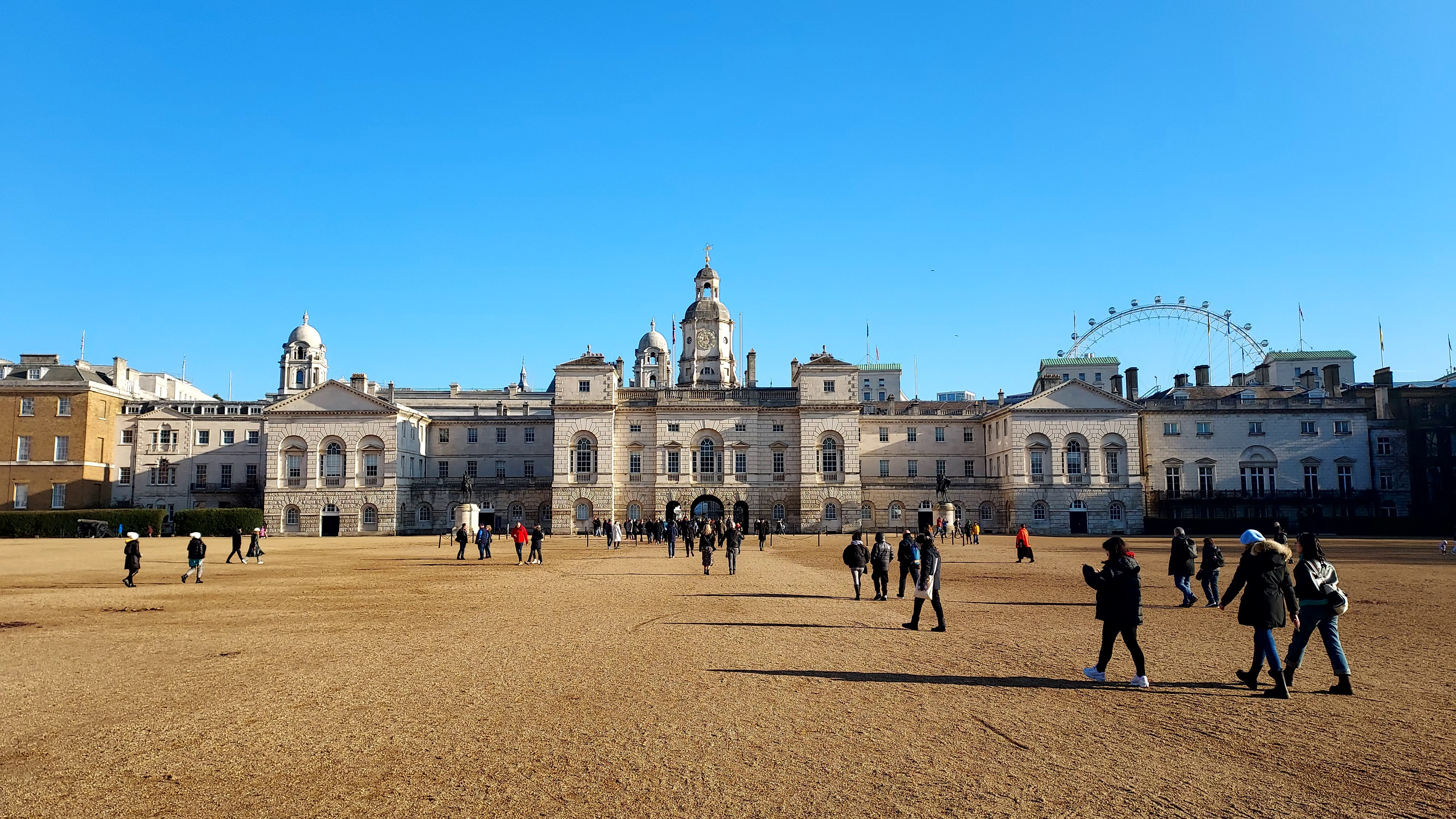
Horse Guards Parade with the London Eye Ferris wheel in the background at right

For much of the late 20th century, Horse Guards Parade was used as a car park for senior civil servants; about 500 were granted the privilege, which was known as the 'Great Perk'. The IRA's mortar attack on 10 Downing Street on 7 February 1991, which was carried out from a vehicle parked in Horse Guards Avenue nearby, narrowly missed causing casualties and led to concerns. In April 1993 the Royal Parks Review Group, headed by Dame Jennifer Jenkins, recommended that the parade should be restored for public use, and linked to St James's Park by closing Horse Guards Road. The proposal was taken up by the Department of National Heritage but then resisted by senior Cabinet members, apparently under pressure from the civil servants who were to lose their parking places.

Public revelation of the resistance led to considerable criticism by Simon Jenkins, a newspaper columnist, who pressured Sir Robin Butler, Head of the Home Civil Service, to end general usage as parking as part of a wider programme of reforms. In late 1996 Horse Guards Parade was cleared, for repairs, and in March 1997 it was announced that parking was banned.

== Layout ==
The parade ground is open on the west side, where it faces Horse Guards Road and St James's Park. It is enclosed to the north by the Admiralty Citadel and the Admiralty Extension building, to the east by Admiralty House, William Kent's Horse Guards and the rear of Dover House (home of the Scotland Office), and to the south by Kent's Treasury building (now used by the Cabinet Office), garden walls of 10 Downing Street (the official residence and office of the British Prime Minister) and Mountbatten Green before the Foreign and Commonwealth Office's west wing. Access to the south side is restricted for national security.

On the east side, Horse Guards Parade is normally accessible to the public from Whitehall through the arches of Horse Guards.

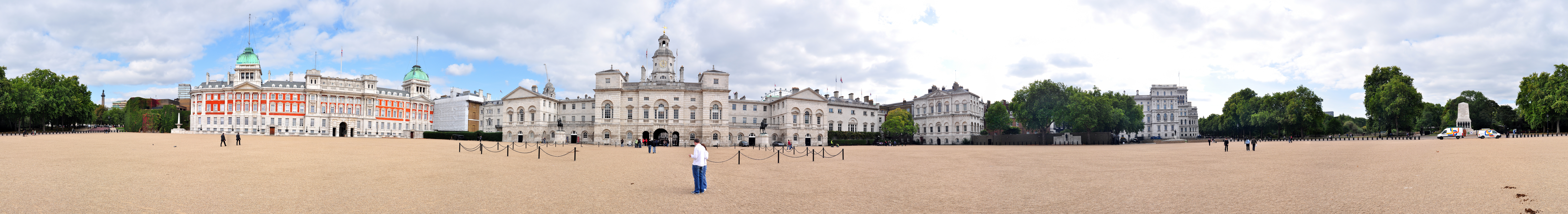
Panorama of Horse Guards Parade, from the northwest corner. North: Admiralty Citadel, Admiralty Extension building; east: Admiralty House (with a scaffold at its cornice level), Household Cavalry Museum, Horse Guards, Dover House; South: Cabinet Office, garden wall and trees of 10 Downing Street, Mountbatten Green and small part of the Foreign and Commonwealth Office; west: St James's Park (at foreground, centre) the Guards Memorial.

== Monuments ==
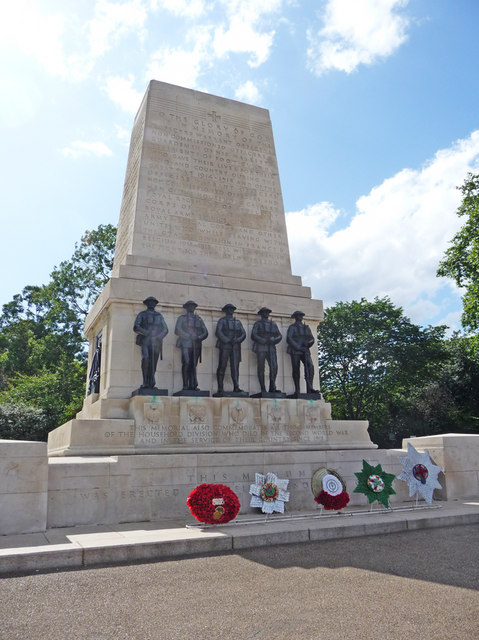
The Guards Memorial

A number of military monuments and trophies ring the outside of the parade ground, including:

- To the west, beside St James's Park, the Guards Memorial, designed by the sculptor Gilbert Ledward in 1923–26 and erected to commemorate the First Battle of Ypres and other battles of World War I.
- To the north, the Royal Naval Division War Memorial, designed by Sir Edwin Lutyens in 1925, removed before the Second World War, and returned to its original site beside the Admiralty Extension building and rededicated on "Beaucourt Day" (13 November 2003).
- To the east:
  - Equestrian statues of Field Marshals Roberts and Wolseley (see Equestrian statue of the Earl Roberts, London and Equestrian statue of the Viscount Wolseley).
  - A Turkish cannon made in 1524 "by Murad son of Abdullah, chief gunner" which was captured in Egypt in 1801.
  - The Cádiz Memorial, a French mortar mounted on a brass monster which commemorates the lifting of the Siege of Cádiz in Spain in 1812.
- To the south, statues of Field Marshal Kitchener and of Admiral of the Fleet Mountbatten (see Statue of the Earl Kitchener, London and Statue of the Earl Mountbatten, London).

An oddity is the black background to the number 2 of the double sided clock which overlooks the Parade Ground and the front entrance, it is popularly thought to commemorate the time the last absolute monarch of England, Charles I, was beheaded at the Banqueting House opposite.

== Ceremonial ==
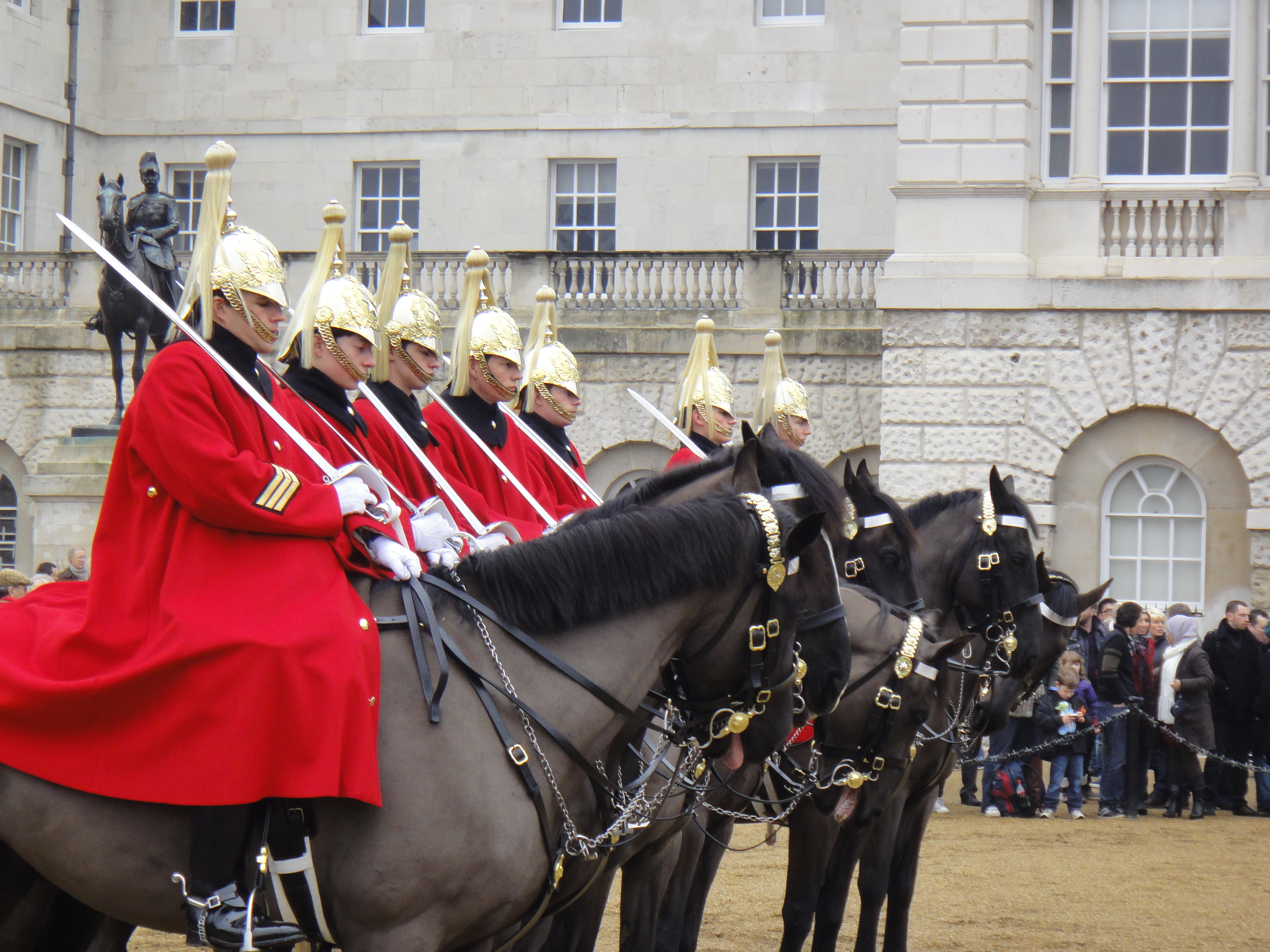
Changing The King's Life Guard in 2013.

=== Changing The King's Life Guard ===
The ceremony of Changing The King's Life Guard takes place every weekday at 11:00 am on Horse Guards Parade, adjacent to the Horse Guards building. Two mounted sentries guard the entrance to Horse Guards on Whitehall from 10:00 am until 4:00 pm and are changed every hour. There is a dismounted parade at 4:00 pm and two dismounted sentries remain on duty until 8:00 pm.

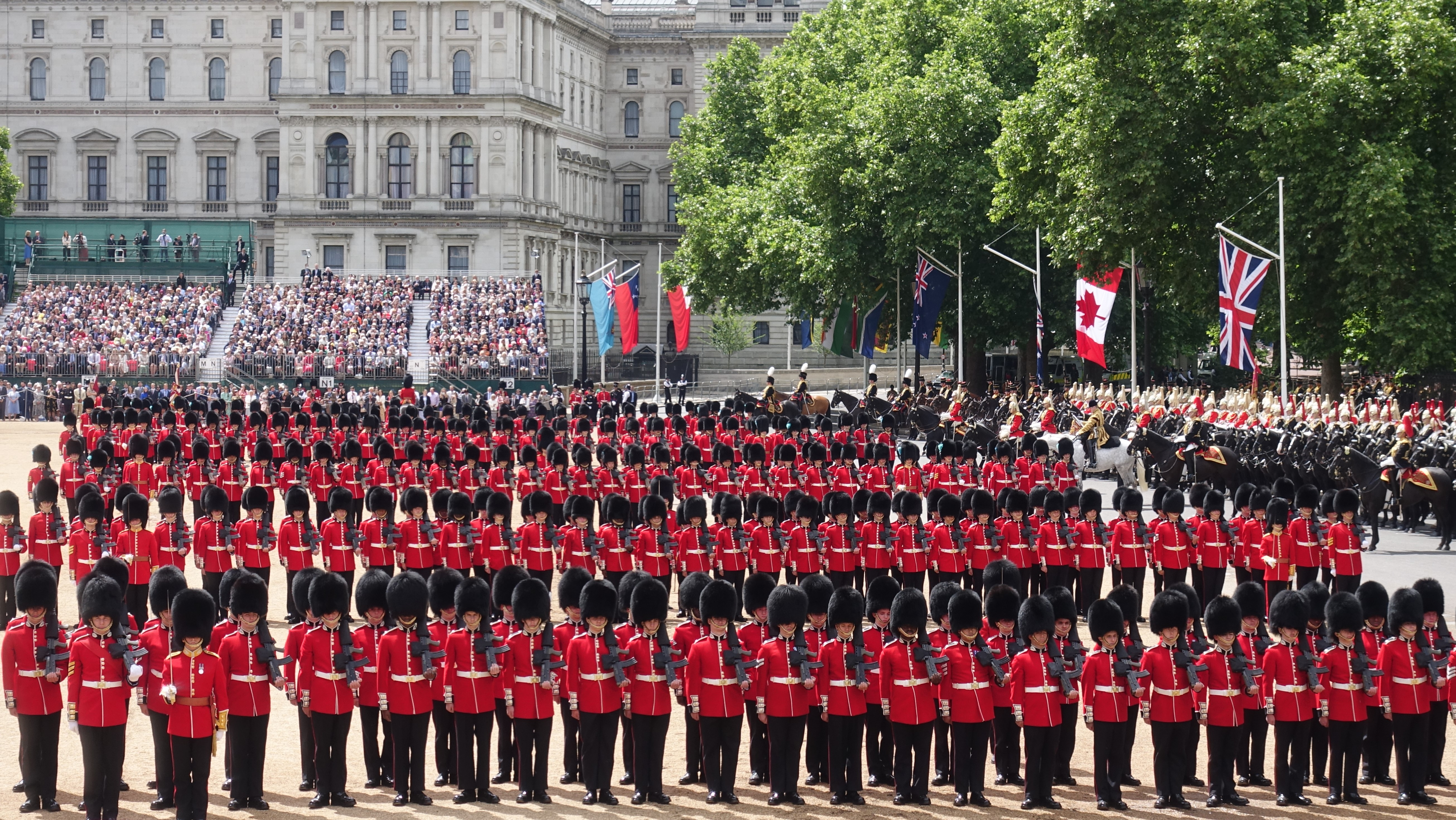
Trooping the Colour in 2022.

=== Trooping the Colour ===
In the early summer, grandstands are erected in Horse Guards Parade in preparation for the Trooping the Colour ceremony which is usually on the second Saturday in June and celebrates the monarch's Official Birthday. There are two full dress rehearsals:

- The Major General's Review, usually two weeks beforehand, when the salute is taken by the Major-General commanding the Household Division
- The Colonel's Review, the week beforehand, when the salute is taken by the Royal colonel of whichever of the five regiments of foot guards will have their regimental colour "trooped".

Around 1,400 soldiers take part in the ceremony in which the regimental colour of one of the guards regiments is "trooped" or marched along the assembled ranks. It concludes with the foot and horse guards marching past and saluting the monarch. The public can watch the troops enter and leave Horse Guards Parade and tickets for the seating are sold subject to a ballot.

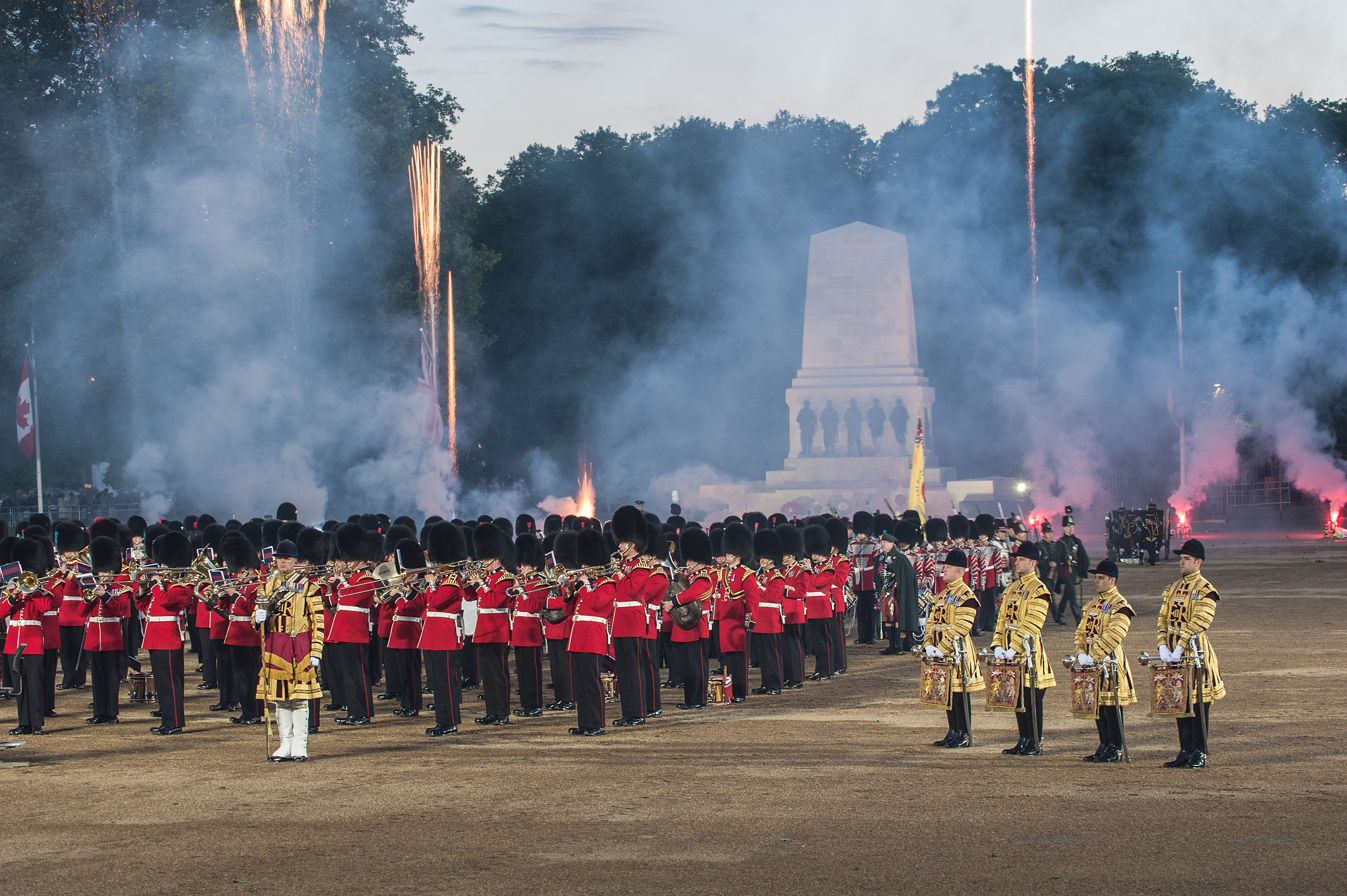
The Bands of the Household Division at the finale of Beating Retreat in 2013.

=== Beating Retreat ===
On two evenings in June, this ceremony is carried out by the Bands of the Household Division. Beating Retreat is also performed at Horseguards biannually in July by the Royal Marines Band Service. Proceeds from ticket sales are donated to military charities.

=== Remembrance Sunday ===
At the National Service of Remembrance, the various contingents of veterans' organisations form up on Horse Guards Parade, and after the ceremony at The Cenotaph, they return and march past a member of the Royal Family by the Guards Memorial, who takes their salute.

== Sporting and public events ==
=== 2012 Summer Olympics ===
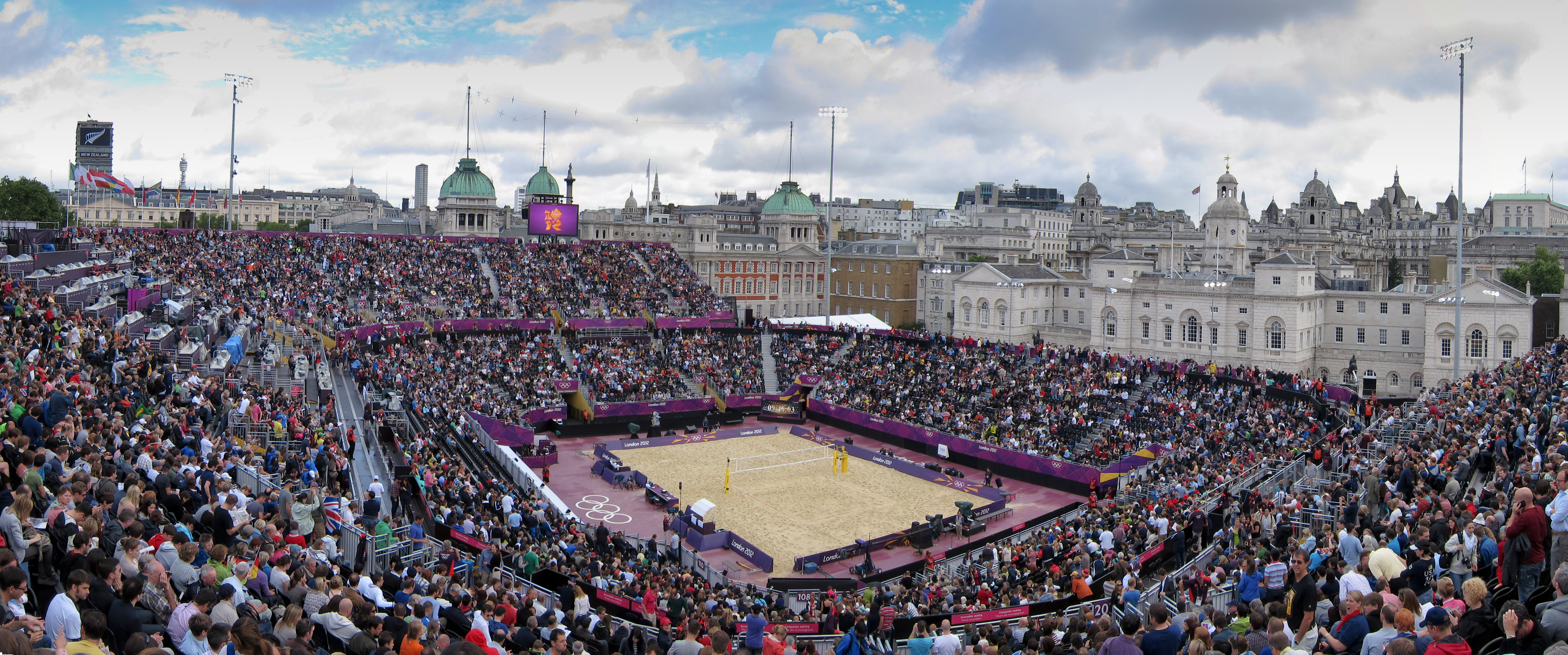
Horse Guards Parade during the 2012 Summer Olympics

Horse Guards Parade hosted beach volleyball at the 2012 Summer Olympics held in London. Temporary courts and seating designed by Populous were installed by the Arena Group, much as seating is installed annually for Trooping the Colour. There was one court with a capacity of 15,000 with two tiers and a floodlight tower at each of its four corners, two practice courts to the east of the arena, and a further six practice courts at St. James's Park. Most matches were played on Centre Court, but some matches were played on Court 1 on day 6 of the competition.

=== London Polo Championships ===
Horse Guards Parade hosted the 1st London Polo Championships on 17 and 18 June 2009 with teams from around the world.

=== Sainsbury's Anniversary Games 2014 ===
On Sunday 20 July 2014, a temporary arena played host to the anniversary games.
