= Admiralty buildings =

Building complex in London

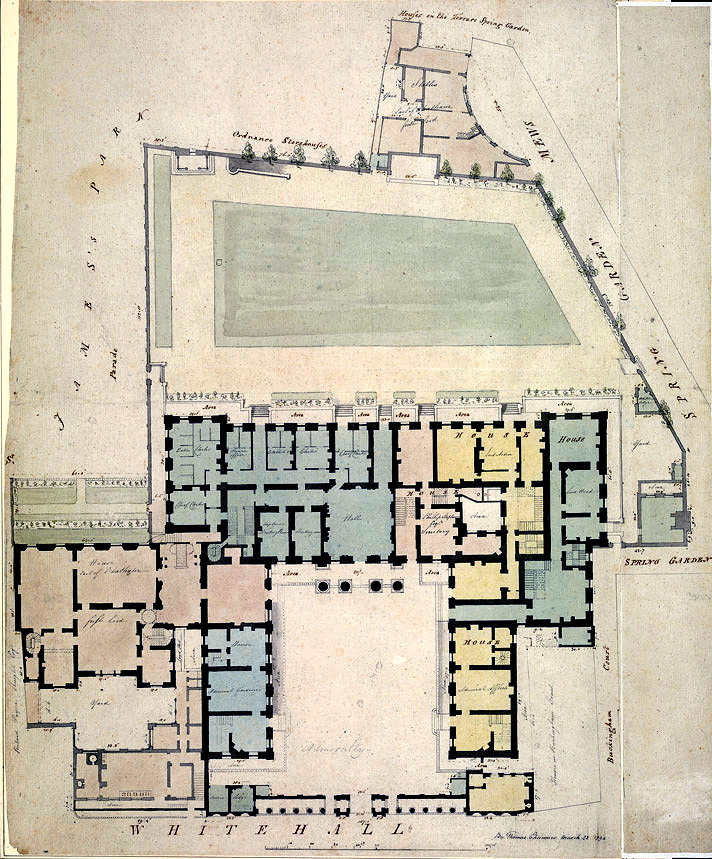
The Admiralty complex in 1794. The colours indicate departments or residences for the several Lords of the Admiralty. The pale coloured extension behind the small courtyard, on the left is Admiralty House.

The Admiralty buildings are five interconnected buildings in London between Whitehall, Horse Guards Parade and The Mall, which once formed the headquarters of the Admiralty, the government department responsible for the Royal Navy. The five buildings are the Ripley Building, Admiralty House, Admiralty Extension, Admiralty Arch, and the Admiralty Citadel. The Admiralty was abolished in 1964 and the buildings are now used by various government departments, including the Foreign, Commonwealth and Development Office, Department for Business and Trade, and Ministry of Defence.

== The Admiralty ==
The oldest building was long known simply as The Admiralty; it is now known officially as the Ripley Building, a three-storey U-shaped brick building designed by Thomas Ripley and completed in 1726. Alexander Pope implied that the architecture is rather dull, lacking either the vigour of the Baroque style, fading from fashion at the time, or the austere grandeur of the Palladian style just coming into vogue. It is mainly notable for being perhaps the first purpose-built office building in Great Britain. It contained the Admiralty board room, which is still used by the Admiralty Board, other state rooms, offices and apartments for the Lords of the Admiralty. Robert Adam designed the screen, which was added to the entrance front in 1788. In January 1806, the body of Lord Nelson lay in the building on the night preceding his state funeral. The Ripley Building is currently occupied by the International Development section of the Foreign, Commonwealth and Development Office.

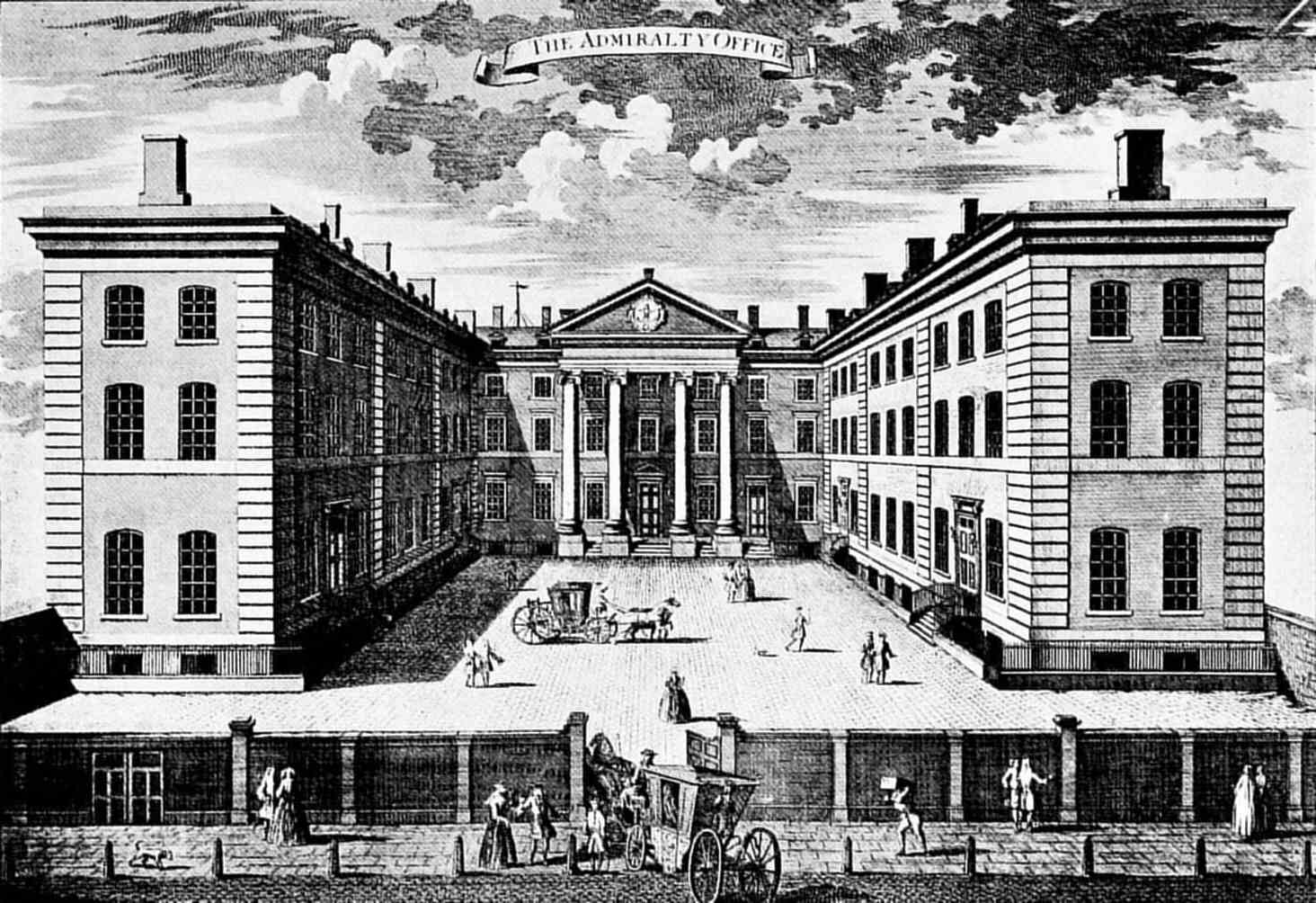
The Old Admiralty (Ripley Building) in 1760, before the addition of the Adam screen

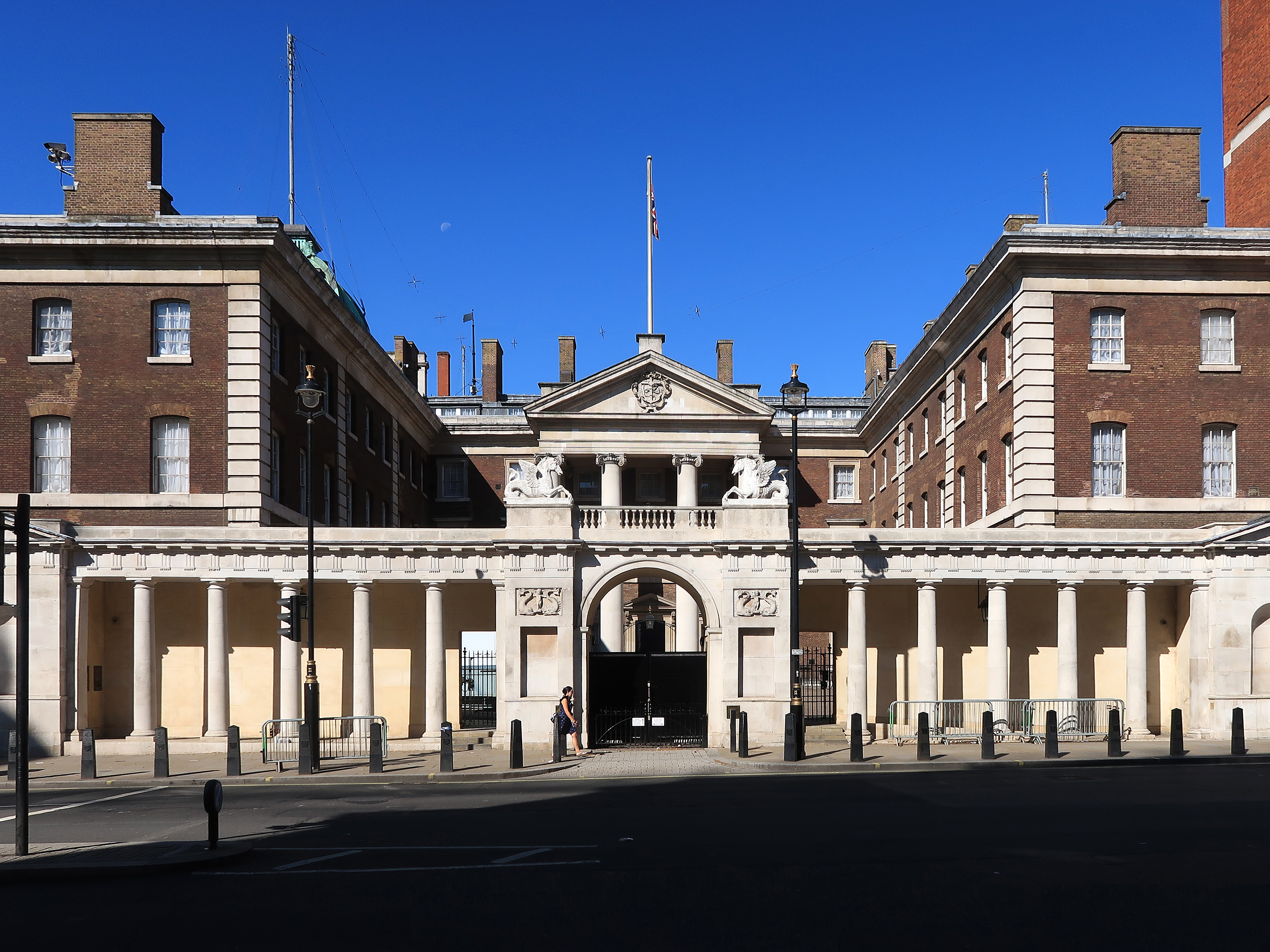
The Ripley Building in 2018

== Admiralty House ==
Admiralty House is a moderately proportioned mansion to the south of the Ripley Building, designed by Samuel Pepys Cockerell and built in the late 18th century as the residence of the First Lord of the Admiralty in 1788. Winston Churchill was one of its occupants in 1911–1915 and 1939–1940. It lacks its own entrance from Whitehall and is entered through the Ripley Courtyard or Ripley Building. It is a three-storey building in yellow brick with neoclassical interiors. The ground floor comprises meeting rooms for the Cabinet Office and the upper floors are three ministerial residences.

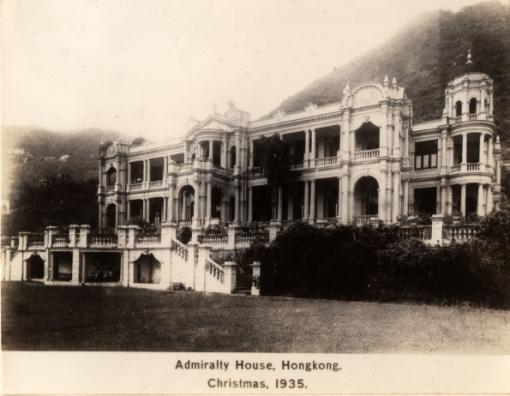
Admiralty House, Hong Kong in 1935

There was formerly also an Admiralty House located at, or near to, the main base and dockyard in each station of the Royal Navy for use of the Commander-in-Chief. Each property was designated as the Admiralty House named for its location, but often possessed a property name (similarly to stone frigates being commissioned with a name distinct from their functional designations, such as HMS Malabar, functionally Her Majesty's Naval Base, Bermuda, which closed in 1995).

The Commander-in-Chief of the station used the Admiralty House when based ashore, but was otherwise based afloat aboard the flagship of the squadron. There may have been more than one Admiralty House per station, as with the North America Station (later the North America and West Indies Station, and finally the America and West Indies Station), the squadron of which was for a time based in Bermuda during the winter months and Halifax, Nova Scotia, during the summers, before Bermuda became the year-round headquarters. Former Admiralty Houses would cease to have that function, either being disposed of (if having been on Admiralty property) or re-purposed as separate stations were merged, such as the Jamaica Station being merged with the North America Station to create the North America and West Indies Station.

== Admiralty Extension ==
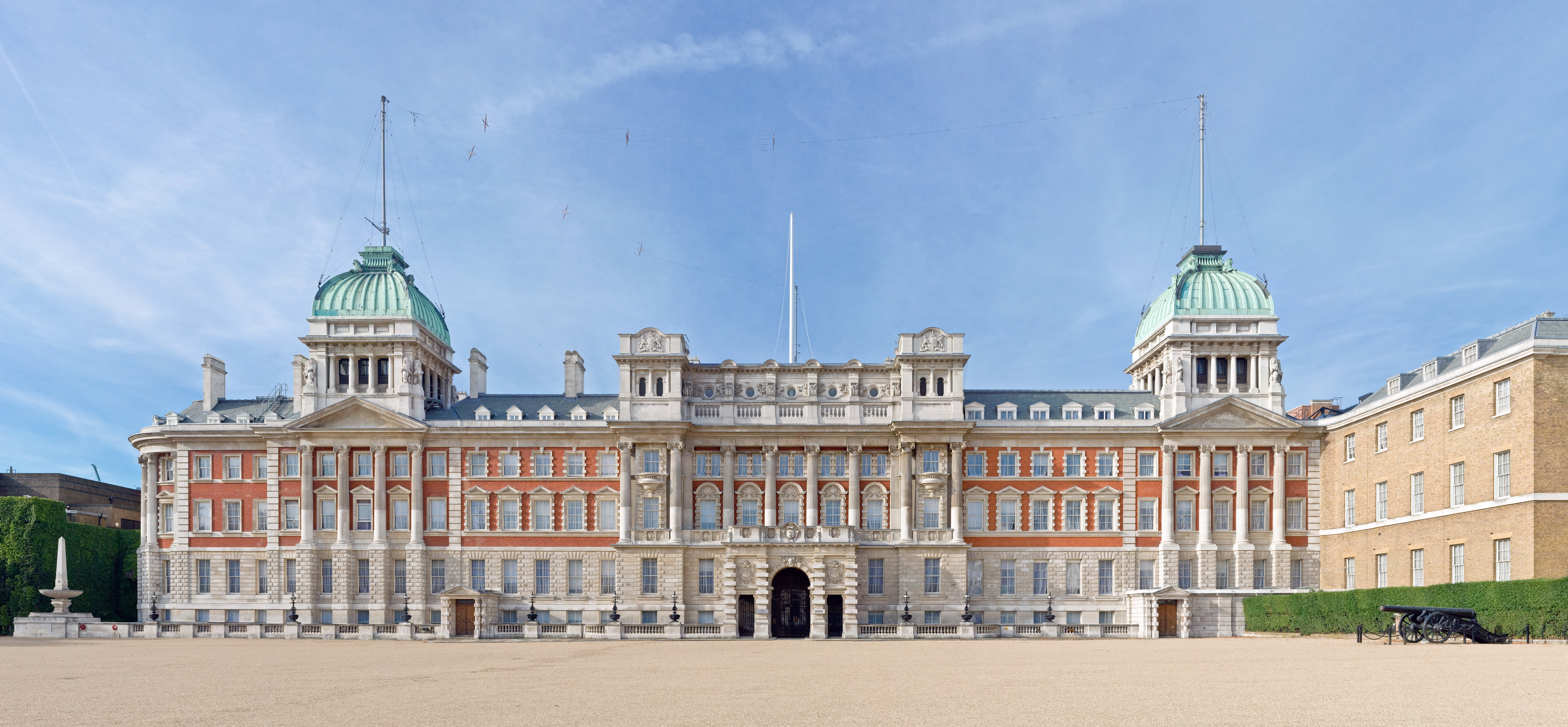
The Admiralty Extension (which is also one of the two buildings which are sometimes referred to as the "Old Admiralty") dates from the turn of the 20th century.

This is the largest of the Admiralty Buildings. It was begun in the late 19th century and redesigned while the construction was in progress to accommodate the extra offices needed by the naval arms race with the German Empire. It is a red brick building with white stone, detailing in the Queen Anne style with French influences. It has been used by the Foreign and Commonwealth Office from the 1960s to 2016. The Department for Education planned to move into the building in September 2017 following the Foreign and Commonwealth Office's decision to leave the building and consolidate its London staff into one building on King Charles Street. A change of contractor (BAM was replaced by Willmott Dixon) then delayed consolidation of the Department for Education to autumn 2018.

In 2021, the building became the home of the Department for International Trade. In February 2023, the Department for International Trade (DIT) was merged with the business-focused parts of the Department for Business, Energy and Industrial Strategy (BEIS) to form the new Department for Business and Trade (DBT) which continued to be headquartered in the Old Admiralty extension.

== Admiralty Arch ==
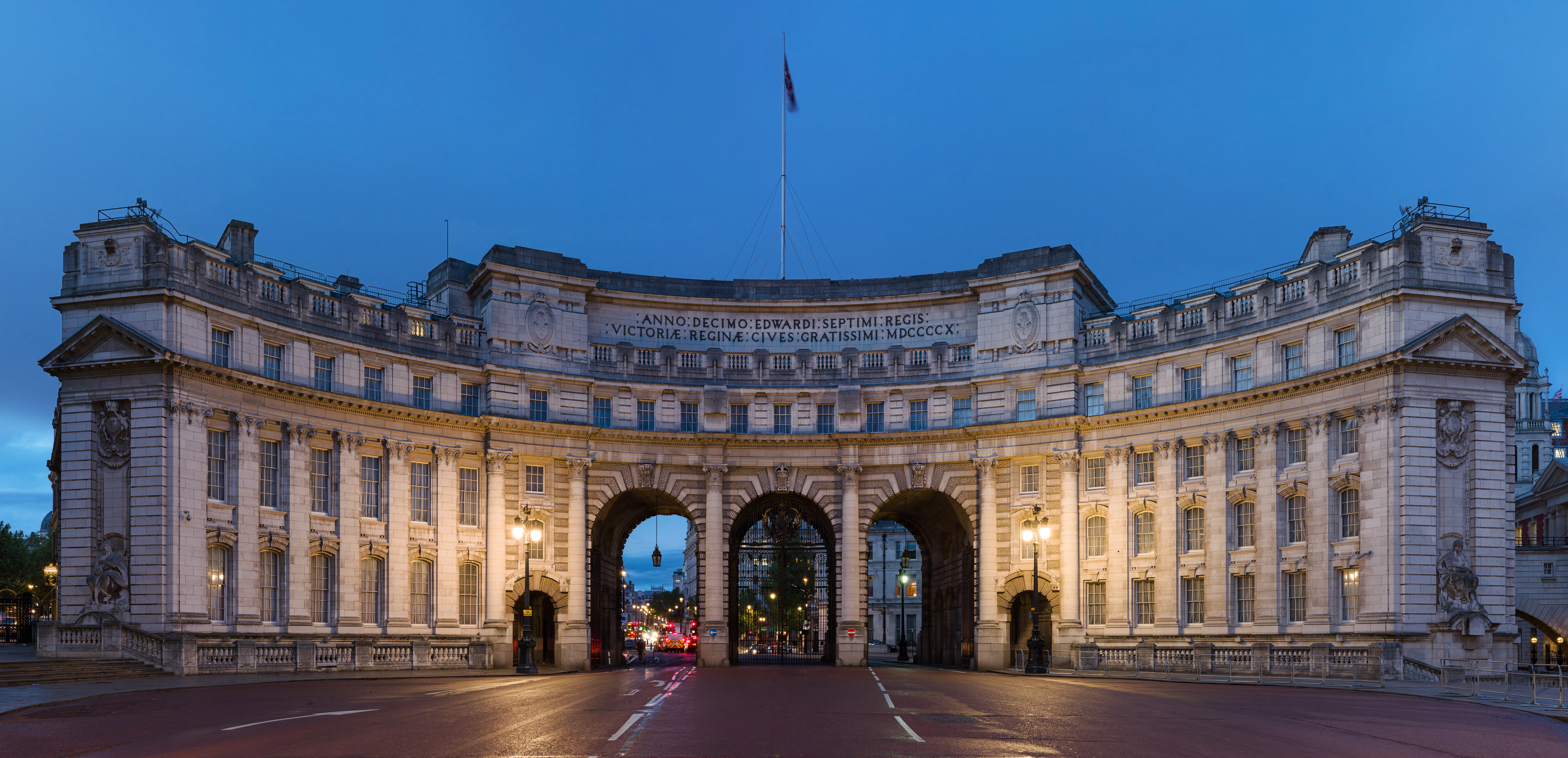
Admiralty Arch

Admiralty Arch is linked to the Old Admiralty Building by a bridge and is part of the ceremonial route from Trafalgar Square to Buckingham Palace. In 2012, HM Government sold the building on a 125-year lease for £60m for a proposed redevelopment into a Waldorf Astoria luxury hotel and four apartments.

== The Admiralty Citadel ==
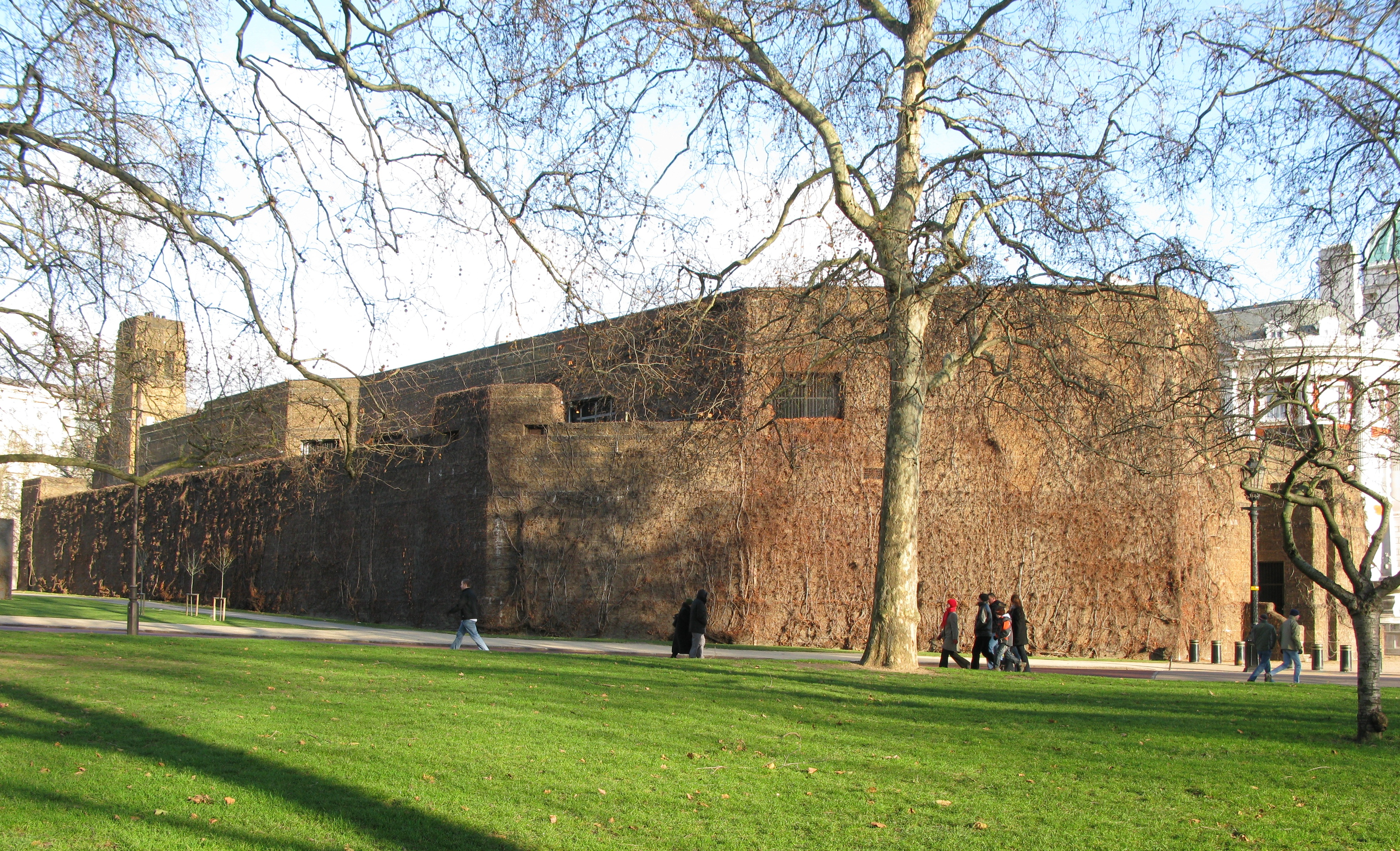
Bomb proof citadel constructed 1940 for Admiralty headquarters

The Admiralty Citadel is a squat, windowless Second World War fortress north west of Horse Guards Parade, now covered in ivy.
