= Guards Memorial =

War memorial in London, England

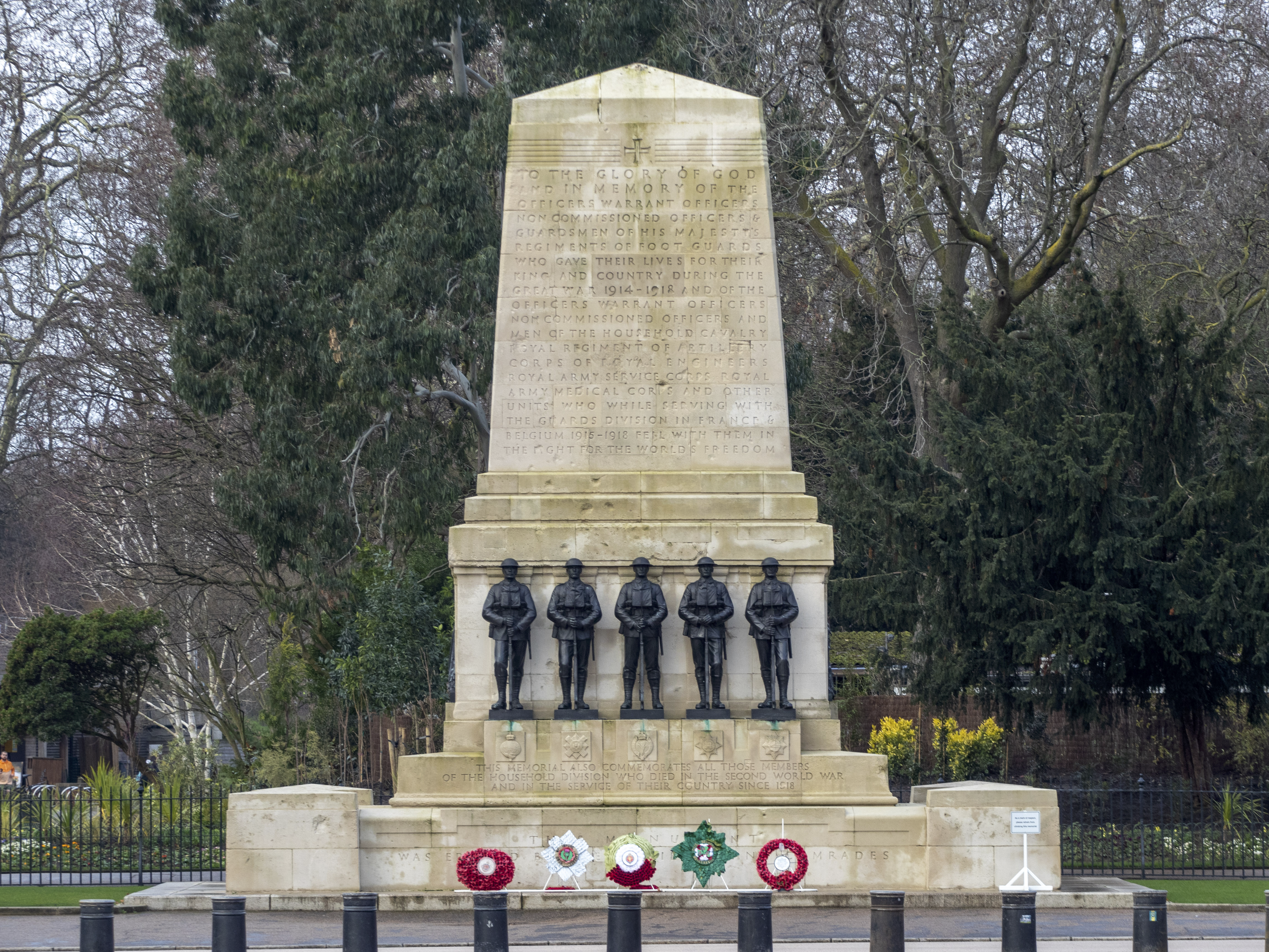
- The memorial in 2026
- Interactive map of Guards Memorial
- Location: London
- Coordinates: 51.5044°N 0.1295°W
- Designer: H. Chalton Bradshaw
- Type: War memorial
- Material: Portland stone
- Height: 38 feet
- Opening date: 16 October 1926
- Dedicated to: War dead from the Guards Division

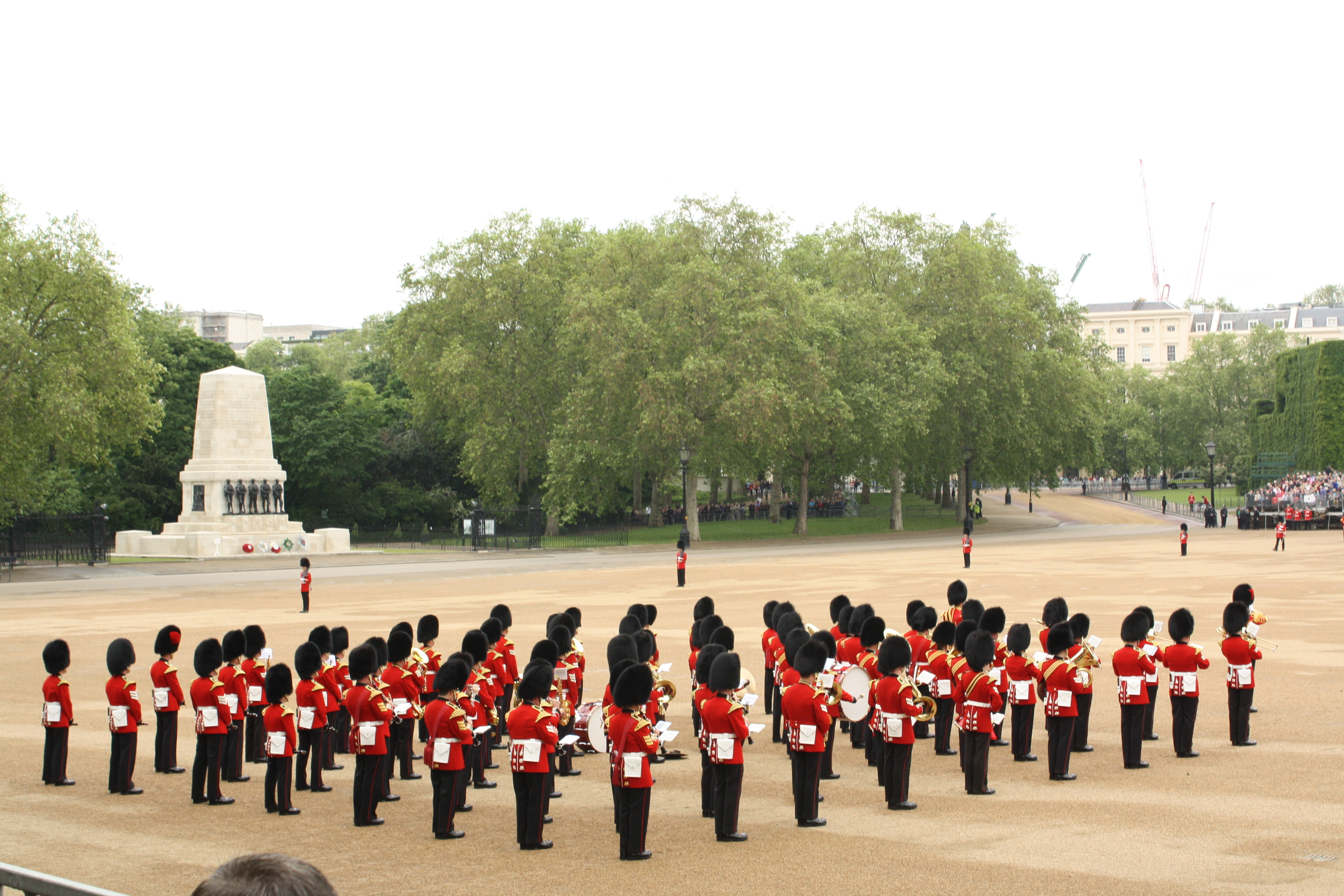
The memorial stands to the west side of Horse Guards Parade

The Guards Memorial, also known as the Guards Division War Memorial, is an outdoor war memorial located on the west side of Horse Guards Road, opposite Horse Guards Parade in London, United Kingdom. It commemorates the war dead from the Guards Division and related units during the First World War, and of the Household Division in the Second World War and other conflicts since 1918.

== Design ==
The cenotaph memorial was designed by H. Chalton Bradshaw. It includes a broad squat white Portland stone obelisk 38 feet (12 m) high standing on a white stone base with three steps. On a raised platform to the east side of the memorial, facing Horse Guards Parade, are five large bronze sculptures by Gilbert Ledward, one representing each of the Foot Guards Regiments, standing easy with their rifles above stone carvings showing the badge of each regiment, each slightly larger than life size, about 7 feet 3 inches (2.21 m) in high. The statues are modelled on serving guardsmen: Sergeant R. Bradshaw MM of the Grenadier Guards, Lance Corporal J. S. Richardson of the Coldstream Guards, Guardsman J. McDonald of the Scots Guards, Guardsman Simon McCarthy of the Irish Guards (with legs modelled by another guardsman, Lance Sergeant W. J. Kidd) and Guardsman A. Comley of the Welsh Guards. The other three sides each bear a bronze panel, one to either side depicting military equipment and the one to the rear depicting artillery in action. The statues and panels were cast by the William Morris Art Bronze Foundry using bronze taken from German guns melted down after the First World War.

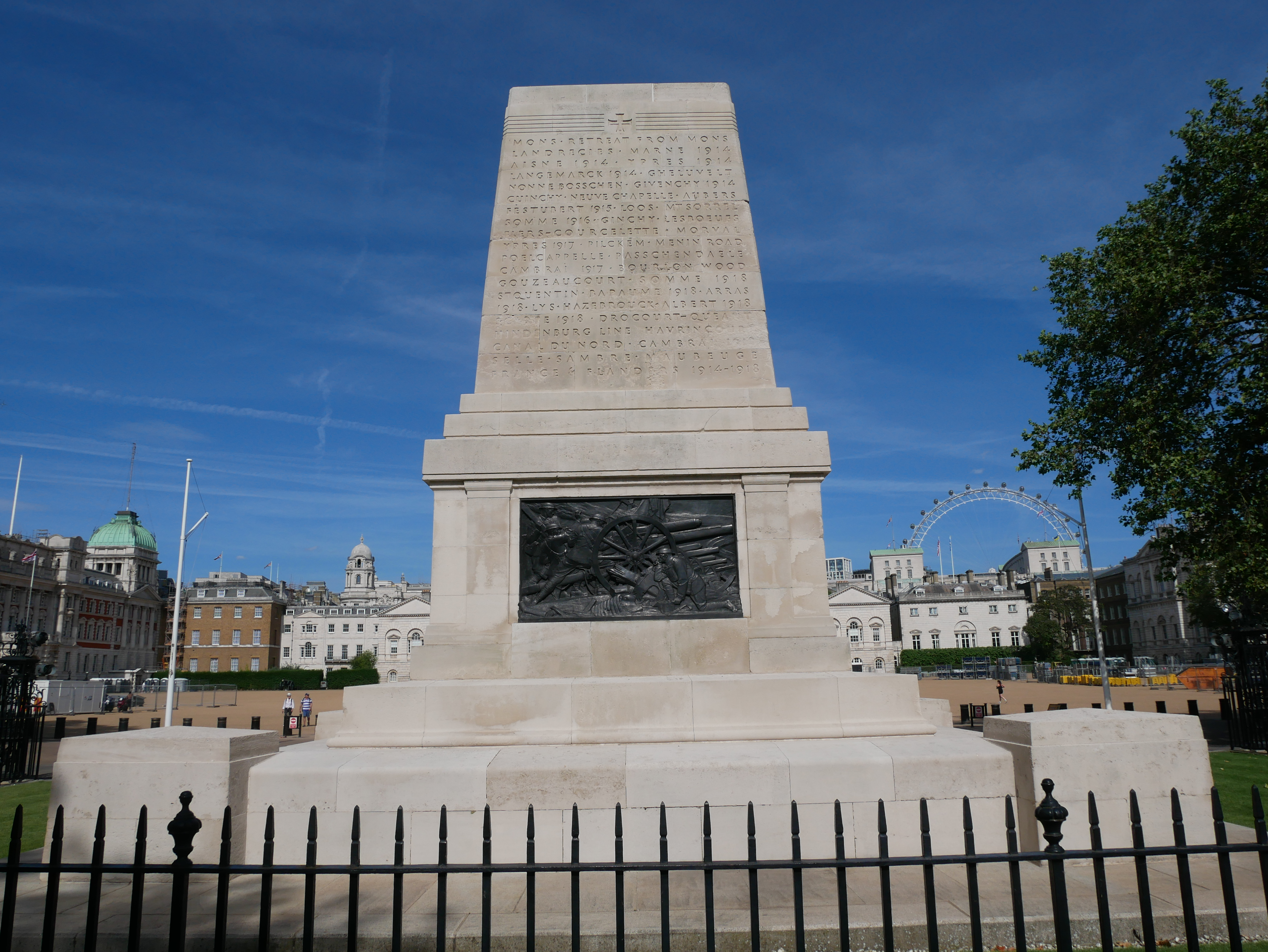
The west face of the Guards Memorial

Above the five statues, the cenotaph also bears an inscription written by Rudyard Kipling, whose only son John was killed in action while serving the Irish Guards at the Battle of Loos in September 1915: "To the Glory of God // And in the memory of the // Officers Warrant Officers // Non Commissioned Officers & // Guardsmen of His Majesty's // Regiments of Foot Guards // who gave their lives for their // King and Country during the // Great War 1914–1918 and of the // Officers Warrant Officers // Non-Commissioned Officers and // Men of the Household Cavalry // Royal Regiment of Artillery // Corps of Royal Engineers // Royal Army Service Corps Royal // Medical Corps and other // Units who while serving the // Guards Division in France & // Belgium 1915–1918 fell with them in // the fight for the World's Freedom."

Above the main inscription is an incised cross between bands of horizontal incised lines, and lower down is a second inscription: "This monument // was erected by their friends and comrades". Further inscriptions on the sides of the cenotaph record the units involved, and the west side, below another cross, records their battle honours.

== Construction ==
The monument was built by the Birmingham Guild at a cost of around £22,000, with the lettering cut by Ernest Gillick. It was unveiled by Field Marshal Prince Arthur, Duke of Connaught and Strathearn at a ceremony on 16 October 1926, accompanied by the 100-year-old veteran of the Crimean War General Sir George Higginson, with a dedication by Rev. H. J. Fleming, who became senior chaplain of the Guards Division when it was formed in 1915, and a benediction by the Chaplain-General to the Forces, Rev. Alfred Jarvis, and a march-past by 15,000 serving and former guardsmen. The memorial suffered bomb damage in the Second World War, and some was left unrepaired as "honourable scars".

== Later history ==
After World War II, an inscription was added below the statues to commemorate those who died between 1939 and 1945: "This memorial also commemorates all those members // of the Household Division who died in the Second World War // and in the Service of their Country since 1918."

The memorial received Grade II listing in 1970, and was promoted to Grade I in October 2014.

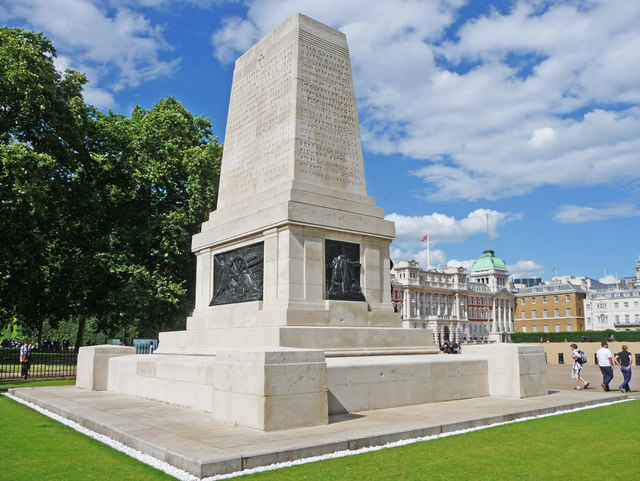
The memorial in 2009, looking northeast towards Horse Guards Parade and the Admiralty

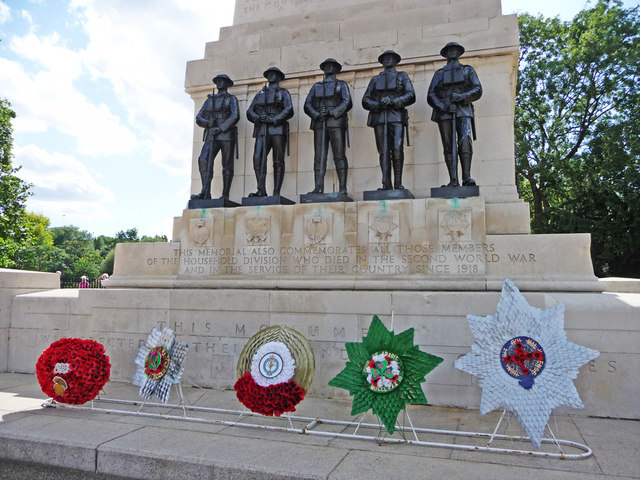
Wreaths laid before the five bronze statues in 2009

== See also ==
- 1926 in art
- Grade I listed buildings in the City of Westminster
- Grade I listed war memorials in England
- World War I memorials
