= Equestrian statue of Earl Roberts, London =

Equestrian statue in London, England

Equestrian statue of Earl Roberts
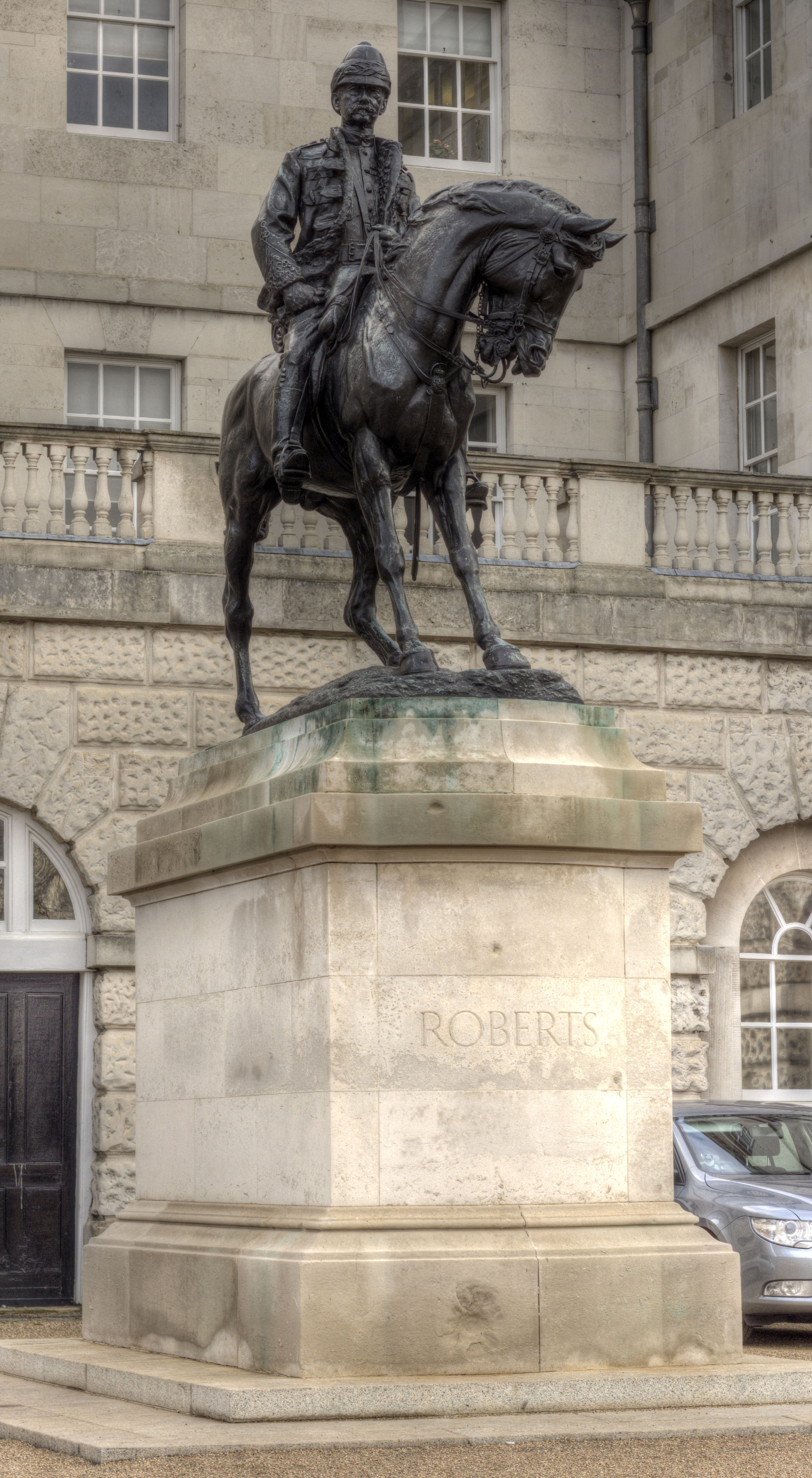
- The statue in 2015
- Artist: Harry Bates
- Subject: Frederick Roberts, 1st Earl Roberts
- Location: London, United Kingdom; 51°30′16″N 0°07′39″W

The equestrian statue of Earl Roberts is an outdoor sculpture of Frederick Roberts, 1st Earl Roberts by Harry Bates, installed at Horse Guards Parade in London, England. The statue was erected to commemorate Frederick Roberts during his service in the 1st World War.
