= Garden of 10 and 11 Downing Street =

Garden behind UK prime minister's official residence

Coordinates: 51.5037°N 0.1279°W

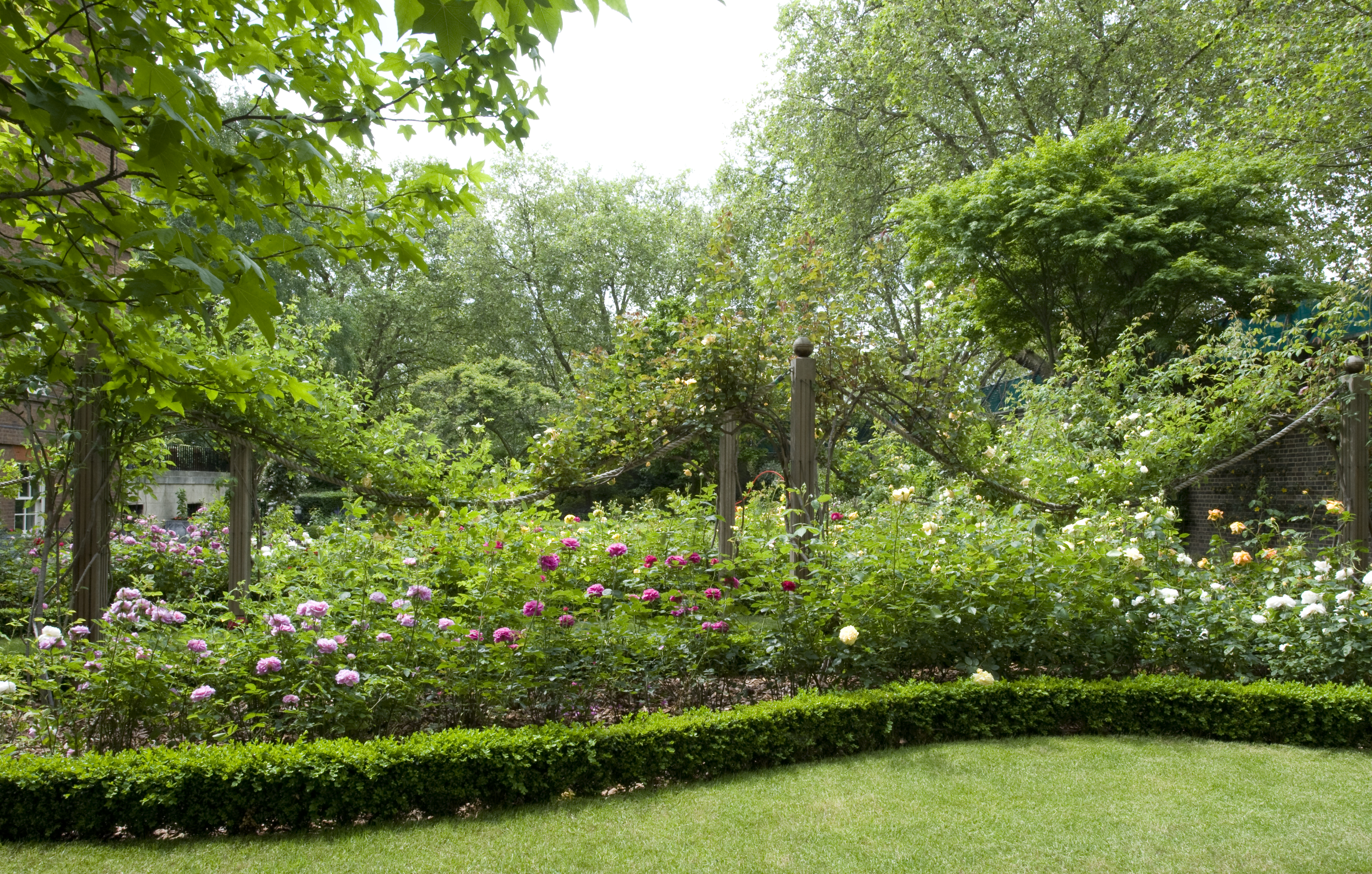
The path edge of the garden at Downing Street.

The garden of 10 and 11 Downing Street is an L-shaped garden, 1/2 acre (0.2 ha) in size, behind the official residences of the prime minister of the United Kingdom and the chancellor of the exchequer, 10 and 11 Downing Street in the Whitehall district of the City of Westminster in central London. The garden has been gradually developed over the 20th century under successive prime ministers.

The garden's adjacency to the official residence and use for press conferences has drawn comparisons to the White House Rose Garden. This similarity has led to the garden being nicknamed the 'Rose Garden', though journalist Victoria Summerley, writing in Great Gardens of London, considers this "inaccurate".

Though normally closed to the public, the garden is occasionally opened as part of the London Open Gardens Weekend organised by the London Parks & Gardens Trust.

== History ==
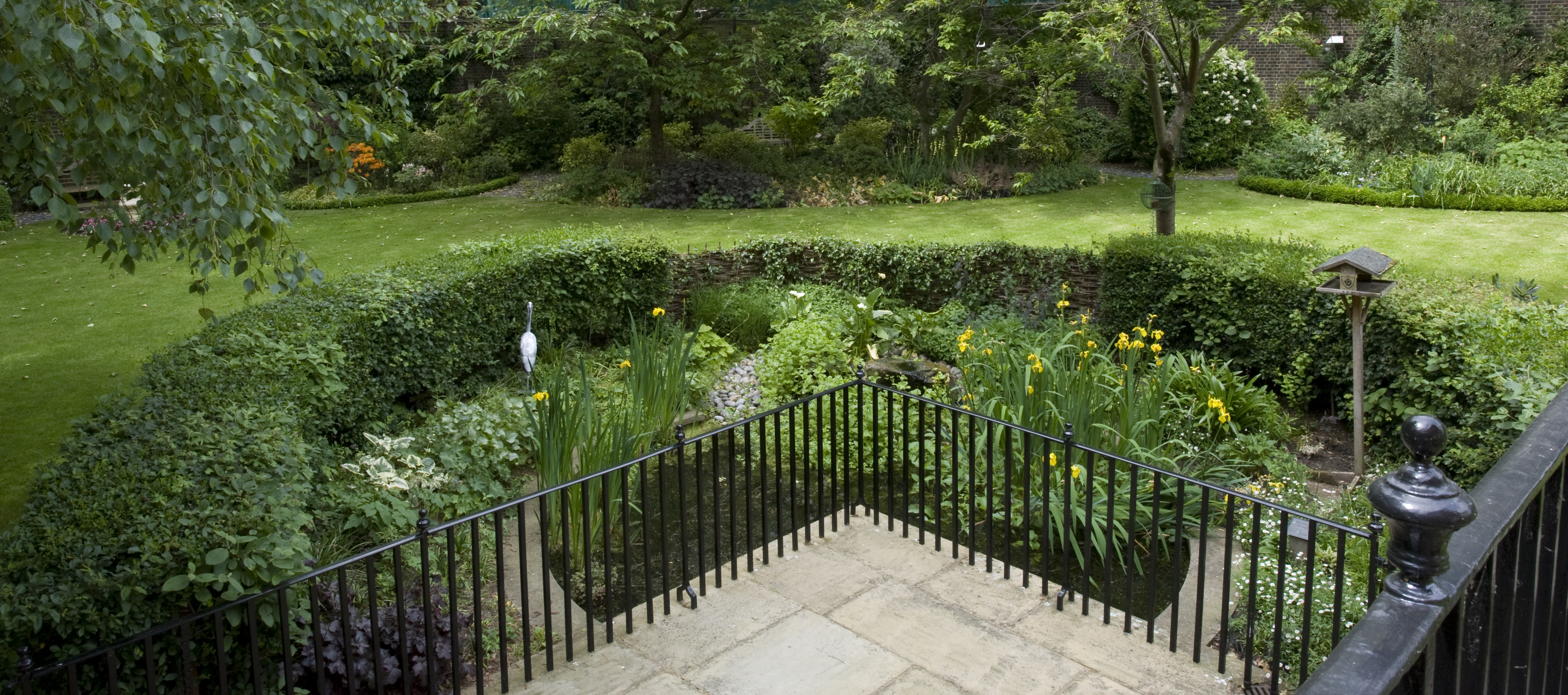
The view of the garden from the balcony

The terrace and garden have provided a casual setting for many gatherings of First Lords with foreign dignitaries, Cabinet ministers, guests, and staff. In September 1941, Winston Churchill and his wife, Clementine, drank champagne in the garden with five "young Frenchmen" who had escaped from France in a canoe before arriving in Eastbourne after having spent 30 hours in the English Channel. Churchill called his secretaries the "garden girls" because their offices overlooked the garden.

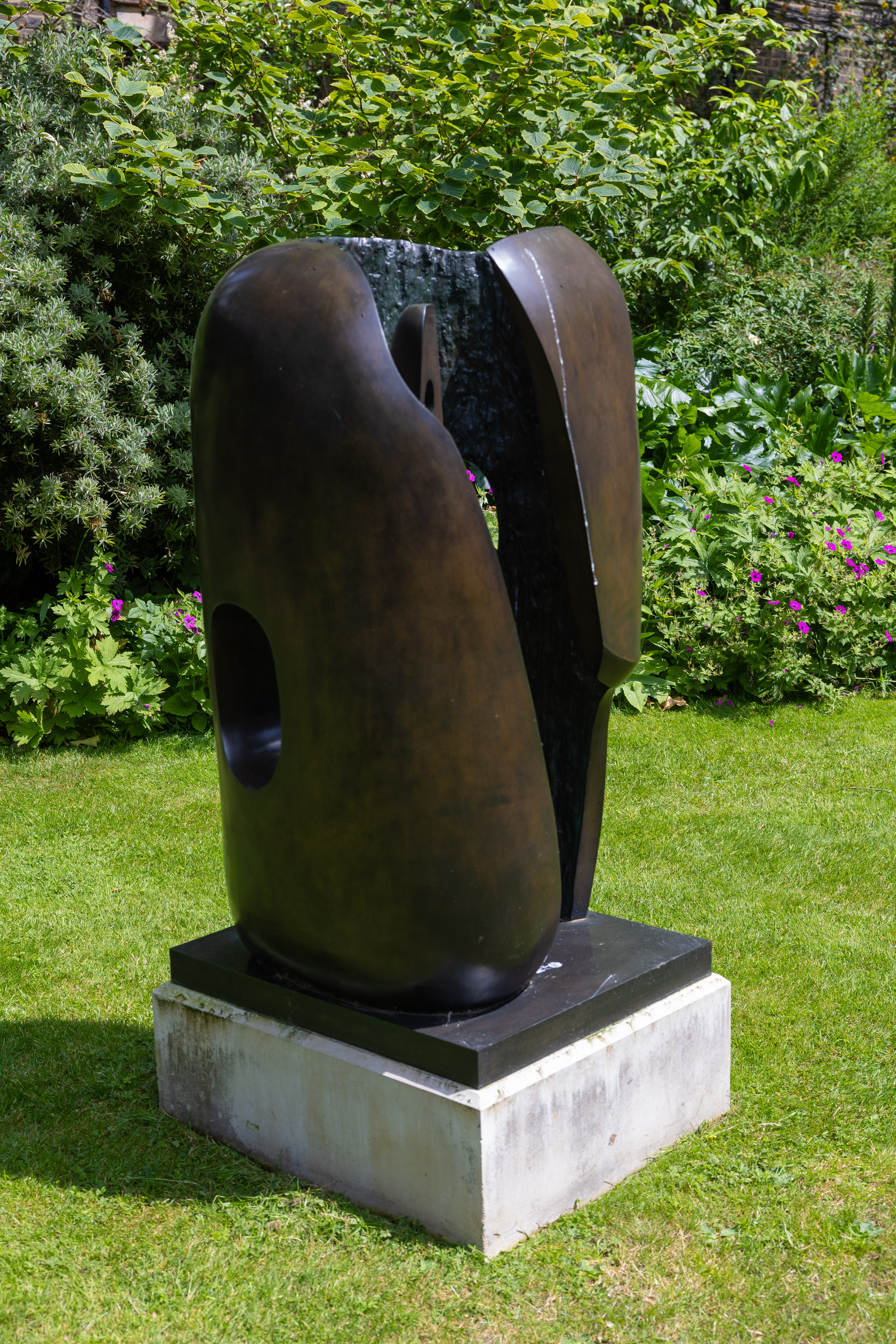
Hollow Form with Inner Form Barbara Hepworth, in the garden

In October 1929 The Times reported on the retirement after 40 years of Downing Street's head gardener, Harry Simpson. Having originally started as a gardener in nearby St James's Park, he had worked in Downing Street under every Prime Minister from William Gladstone to Ramsay MacDonald. The main gardener at Downing Street, Paul Schooling, was awarded the British Empire Medal in the 2010s for his 31 years' service to the Royal Parks and his work at Downing Street over 26 years during the premierships of five Prime Ministers.

In a 1937 article for The Countryman, Neville Chamberlain related that he once spotted a rare leopard moth in the garden, and put a nesting box in the trees, which was later inhabited by a pair of blue tits. Chamberlain was dismayed to find that one of the blue tits's three eggs had later disappeared.

An item in The Times diary in 1989 reported that Margaret Thatcher had believed she had heard a nightingale in the garden. The Sun journalist David Kemp recorded the bird, which was then identified as a song thrush by the RSPB.

In 1991, a shell fired by the Provisional Irish Republican Army during the mortar attack on Downing Street landed in the garden, leaving a 1-meter crater. A woodland garden was created around the crater with cherry trees and daphne odora.

The garden cost The Royal Parks £29,137 in half-yearly maintenance in the six months after the 2010 general election.

John Major announced his 1995 resignation as leader of the Conservative Party in the garden. Tony Blair hosted a farewell reception in 2007 for his staff on the terrace. It was also the location of the first press conference announcing the Coalition Government between David Cameron's Conservatives and Nick Clegg's Liberal Democrats.

The garden has been used for numerous events honouring various public bodies. Cameron and Barack Obama held a barbecue for military personnel in the garden in 2011, and a party to mark the 100th anniversary of the Brownies was held in 2014.

In 2012 Michael Craig-Martin lent his 2011 sculpture of a large red lightbulb, Bulb, for installation in the garden. Barbara Hepworth's 1968 sculpture Hollow Form with Inner Form is situated in the garden, on loan from the Government Art Collection.

A special edition of the BBC Radio 4 programme Gardeners' Question Time was broadcast from Downing Street in December 2016 and featured an interview with the head gardener of the 10 Downing Street garden.

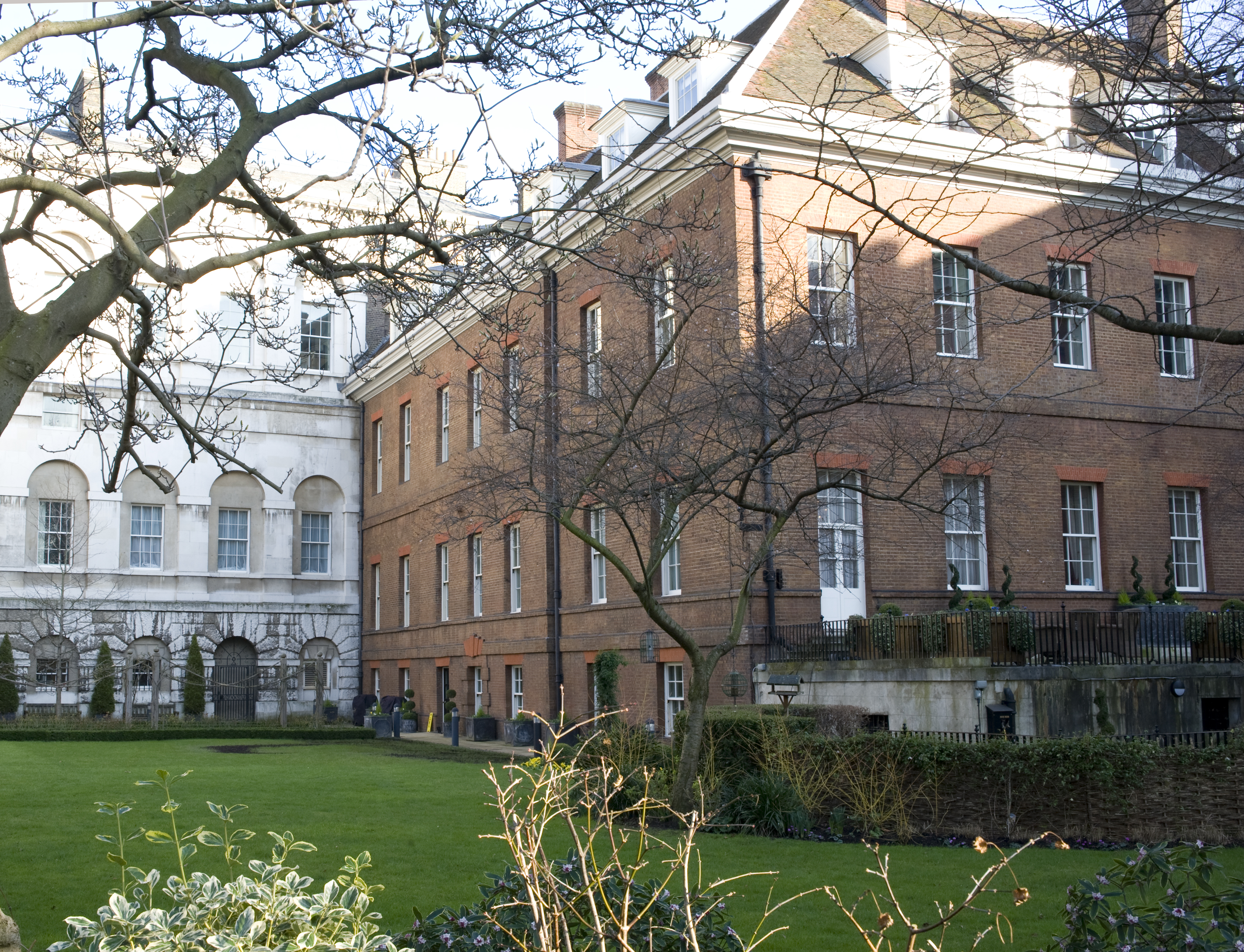
A view of the rear of 10 and 11 Downing Street from the garden

During the COVID-19 pandemic, the garden was the venue for the press conference on 25 May 2020 by Dominic Cummings over his controversial trip to Durham. The garden was also used for work meetings by 10 Downing Street staff, given advice to meet outdoors to reduce transmission risks. In January 2022, controversy arose over whether some events in May 2020 were social gatherings or parties that breached COVID-19 restrictions.

On 27 August 2024 Sir Keir Starmer, the UK Prime Minister, utilised the Rose Garden to unveil his plan to "Fix the foundations" of the country.

== Design ==
Roy Strong described the garden as "one of London's hidden gems". Victoria Summerley, writing in Great Gardens of London, felt that the garden "would not win any medals for garden design" and that the design of the garden was "not an exercise in metropolitan chic or horticultural bling" but instead reflected the features of an "archetypal British back garden" including roses, a shaded area, a large lawn and raised vegetable beds. Summerley observed the evolution of the garden's design, noting that in 1964 it featured only a "very straightforward boring layout of lawn" with a "meagre border around the edge" as evidenced in a photograph of Harold Wilson's cabinet taken in the garden. The shape of the garden has remained unchanged since its creation. The garden's simple design of largely lawn with mature trees, rose beds and flowering shrubs remained unchanged for several years.

The garden behind originally backed on to St James's Park, as evidenced in George Lambert's 1736–1740 painting of the garden in the collection of the Museum of London. The painting depicts two "gentlemen in wigs", one of whom is believed to be Robert Walpole. Lambert's painting depicts rectilinear borders and a "formal grass parterre with small, box-edged beds filled with topiary, flowering plants and dwarf fruit trees". In 1736, in the first reference to the garden, it was written that "a piece of garden ground...hath been lately made and fitted up at the Charge...of the Crown" with "a piece of garden ground scituate in his Majestys park of St. James's, & belonging & adjoining to the house now inhabited by the Right Honourable the Chancellour of his Majestys Exchequer".

Tubs of flowers line the steps from the terrace; around the walls are rose beds with flowering and evergreen shrubs. (See North elevation of Number 10 with steps leading to the garden) The terrace features lead planters inscribed with '1666' and 'CR' (an abbreviation of 'Carolus Rex'). The rose beds were commissioned by Margaret Thatcher and planted with David Austin roses including a rose named for Thatcher herself.

The bird table in the garden was donated by the BBC children's television programme Blue Peter, an addition to the garden that Strong felt was "more appropriate for a between-the-wars semi" and "wrong for a Georgian townhouse". The pond was built by the Wildlife Trust in 2000.

A play area for the Cameron's children with a climbing frame and slide was built in the garden during David Cameron's premiership. Roy Strong described the addition of the play area as "ghastly".

Since the advent of the 21st century, the design of garden has reflected environmental concerns and features introduced have included a rose walk, box-shaped beds and borders and curved paths. These features were introduced under the premiership of Tony Blair. Water for the garden is provided by an underground tank that reuses rainwater, installed in 2009.

Gordon and Sarah Brown installed a vegetable patch in the garden in 2009 after being prompted by Michelle Obama, who had initiated the White House Vegetable Garden. Obama had visited the Downing Street garden in April 2009 and told Sarah Brown that "You know about the White House vegetable garden and you can do one here". Produce from the garden was served in the Downing Street staff canteen. The garden contained "strawberries, tomatoes, beetroot, parsnips, peppers, chard and courgettes" at the time of its public unveiling. The Browns were assisted by their children in planting the garden. Boxes and plants to attract bees and ladybirds were due to be installed at a later date. Writing in The Daily Telegraph, Tim Walker noted that Sarah Brown's vegetable garden had become "woefully neglected" by July 2010 and was told that David and Samantha Cameron "had been too pre-occupied to think much about it — he with sorting out the economic mess that Gordon Brown had left him, and she with her pregnancy".
