= Equestrian statue of Viscount Wolseley =

Equestrian statue in London, England

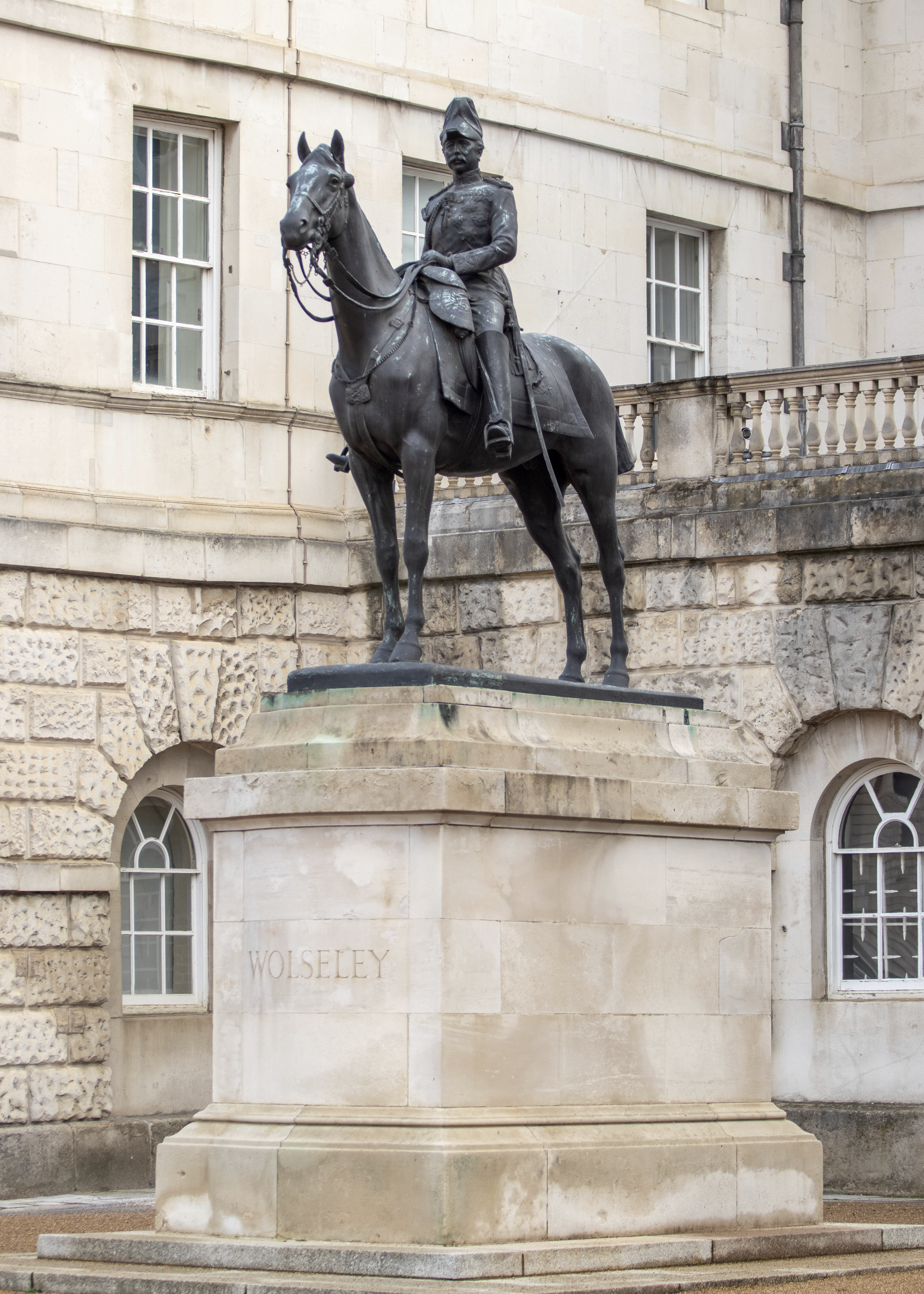
- The sculpture in 2026
- Artist: Sir William Goscombe John
- Year: 1920
- Subject: Garnet Wolseley, 1st Viscount Wolseley
- Location: London; 51°30′18″N 0°7′39″W

The equestrian statue of Viscount Wolseley is an outdoor sculpture depicting Garnet Wolseley, 1st Viscount Wolseley, located at the Horse Guards Parade in London, United Kingdom. It is by Sir William Goscombe John and was unveiled by the Duke of Connaught in 1920. The front of the plinth contains an inscription which reads "Wolseley", while the back includes the inscription: "Field-Marshal Viscount Wolseley, KP, GCB, OM, GCMG, 1833–1913, Commander-in-Chief of the British Army, 1895–1900. / Burmah 1852–3 / Crimea 1854–5 / Indian Mutiny 1857–9 / China 1860–1 / Red River 1870 / Ashanti 1873–4 / South Africa 1879 / Egypt 1882 / Soudan 1884–5."

== See also ==
- 1920 in art
