= List of public art in Victoria, London =

This is a list of public art in Victoria, a district in the City of Westminster, London.

Victoria is roughly described as the area around Victoria station. It includes the conservation areas of Broadway and Christchurch Gardens, Grosvenor Gardens and the environs of Westminster Cathedral. Particularly noteworthy examples of architectural sculpture can be found at 55 Broadway, where in 1928–1929 sculptors including Eric Gill and Henry Moore were engaged on representations of the Four Winds; two further figures, Night and Day, were carved by Jacob Epstein. A great deal of public art by recent graduates of art schools in London was incorporated into Cardinal Place, a development of 2005.

Image	Title / subject	Location and coordinates	Date	Artist / designer	Architect / other	Type	Designation	Notes
	Blue Coat Scholar	Blewcoat School, Caxton Street	1709			Statue in niche	Grade I	
	Hercules Taming the Horses of Diomedes	Buckingham Palace Riding School, Buckingham Palace Road	1859	William Theed	James Pennethorne	Relief	Grade I	
	Architectural sculpture	Grosvenor Hotel, 101 Buckingham Palace Road	c. 1860–1862	Daymond & Son	J. T. Knowles Sr and Jr	Architectural sculpture	Grade II*	Among the figures portrayed in the roundels are Queen Victoria, Prince Albert, Alexander von Humboldt and the prime ministers Palmerston, Derby and Russell. The allegorical sculpture includes two figures in niches which may represent Horticulture and Agriculture.
More images	Statue of Sir Sydney Waterlow, 1st Baronet	Westminster City School, Palace Street 51.4978°N 0.1393°W	1901	Frank Mowbray Taubman	—N/a	Statue	—N/a	Unveiled 27 June 1901. A replica of the statue in Waterlow Park, Highgate.
	Statues of Queen Victoria and Edward VII	Caxton Hall	1902		Lee and Smith	Statues in niches	Grade II	
	Coats of arms of the London, Brighton and South Coast Railway	Victoria station (former LB&SCR building; screen wall onto Buckingham Palace Road)	1905	Gilbert Seale	W. E. Reilly	Architectural sculpture	Grade II	The arms combine those of London, Brighton, the Cinque Ports and Portsmouth.
	Mercury and (?) Minerva	Victoria station (former LB&SCR building; Terminus Place façade)	c. 1905	Gilbert Seale	C. D. Collins	Architectural sculpture	Grade II	Added after criticisms of the initial design for the façade, these figures were nonetheless condemned by The Builder as "gimcrack ornament ... like the decorations of a public house".
	Mermaid caryatids and cartouches	Victoria station (former SE&CR building, Terminus Place)	1909	Henry Charles Fehr	Alfred W. Blomfield	Architectural sculpture	Grade II	
	Christ in Majesty with the Virgin and Saints Joseph, Peter and Edward	Westminster Cathedral 51.4962°N 0.1398°W	1916	Robert Anning Bell	John Francis Bentley	Tympanum mosaic	Grade I (building)	Based on a sketch by Bentley dated to 1895–1896 and later worked up in colour by his assistant John Marshall, Bell's mosaic was criticised for its background of white tiles instead of the traditional gold.
More images	Rifle Brigade War Memorial	Grosvenor Gardens 51.4980°N 0.1470°W	1924–1925	John Tweed	—N/a	Memorial with sculpture	Grade II*	Unveiled 25 July 1925. The rifleman in contemporary uniform in the centre is flanked by an officer (on the left) and a private in early 19th-century uniform.
More images	Reliefs	Apollo Victoria Theatre (formerly the New Victoria Cinema)	1929	Newbury Abbot Trent	William Edward Trent and Ernest Wamsley Lewis	Architectural sculpture	Grade II*	Two panels either side of the main entrance show cinemagoers watching romance and thriller films, respectively. A simplified figure of Charlie Chaplin is at right angles to the panel on the right.
More images	Statue of Ferdinand Foch	Grosvenor Gardens 51.4964°N 0.1453°W	1930	Georges Malissard	P. Lebret	Equestrian statue	Grade II*	Unveiled 5 June 1930. A replica of a statue erected outside Marshal Foch's headquarters in Cassel. The choice of an existing work by a French sculptor caused some dissatisfaction. The site was chosen so that the statue would be seen by French visitors arriving in London at Victoria station.
More images	Speed Wings over the World	National Audit Office building (formerly the Imperial Airways Terminal), Buckingham Palace Road	c. 1937–1939	Eric Broadbent with John William Drake	Albert Lakeman with W. H. Williams	Architectural sculpture	Grade II	Two winged male figures in Art Deco style, reaching out to encircle a globe, with the Imperial Airways insignia below in bas-relief.
	Saint Francis	47 Francis Street	1961	Arthur Fleischmann	Henry Astley Darbishire	Architectural sculpture	Grade II	Unveiled 13 April 1961, when the Catholic Central Library moved into the building. The figure has a halo of sparrows.
More images	Cameo of Queen Victoria	Victoria station, Victoria line platforms	1968	Edward Bawden after Benjamin Pearce	—N/a	Tile motif	—N/a	Bawden produced an original linocut of the Queen's profile for this scheme but it was rejected; the final design is based on a silhouette by Pearce.
More images	Suffragette Memorial	Christchurch Gardens 51.4982°N 0.1348°W	1970	Lorne McKean and Edwin Russell	Paul Edward Paget	Sculpture	—N/a	Unveiled 14 July 1970. A bronze scroll in the shape of the letter S balancing on a conical pedestal. Part of the inscription notes that NEARBY CAXTON HALL WAS/ HISTORICALLY ASSOCIATED/ WITH WOMEN'S SUFFRAGE/ MEETINGS & DEPUTATIONS/ TO PARLIAMENT.
	Split Form No. 9	10 Dean Farrar Street	1983–1984	Michael Marriott	Michael Lyell Associates	Architectural sculpture		
More images	Statue of Harold Alexander, 1st Earl Alexander of Tunis	Outside the Guards Chapel, Wellington Barracks, Birdcage Walk 51.500°N 0.1358°W	1985	James Butler	—N/a	Statue	—N/a	Unveiled 9 May 1985 by the Queen Mother. Alexander had a particular affection for the old Guards Chapel (almost completely destroyed by bombing in 1944), having spent much time there as a subaltern.
	Planned Growth	Rowan House, Greycoat Street	1986–1987	Peter Thursby	Renton Howard Wood Levine	Relief	—N/a	The Royal Society of British Sculptors awarded its silver medal for this sculpture in 1987.
More images	The Flowering of the English Baroque Henry Purcell	Christchurch Gardens 51.4980°N 0.1342°W	1995	Glynn Williams	—N/a	Sculpture	—N/a	Unveiled 22 November 1995, the tercentenary of Purcell's death, by Princess Margaret. The sculptor described the design as "a rising explosion of activity, a tree to the musical evolution of the 17th century". This was the first major sculptural commission by Westminster City Council.
More images	Big Painting Sculpture	Cardinal Place 51.4977°N 0.1418°W	1996–1998	Patrick Heron	Julian Feary	Sculpture	—N/a	Commissioned when the complex was still known as Stag Place. Based on several gouache studies by Heron of brightly coloured floating shapes connected by linear patterns. Neon tubes light up the work at night.
More images	Lioness and Lesser Kudu	Grosvenor Gardens 51.4979°N 0.1473°W	1998	Jonathan Kenworthy	—N/a	Sculptural group	—N/a	Installed on this site in 2000; another cast already stood in the grounds of Eaton Hall, the Duke of Westminster's estate in Cheshire.
More images	Cypher	Outside the Asticus Building, 21 Palmer Street 51.4990°N 0.1352°W	2003	Tim Morgan	—N/a	Sculpture	—N/a	The sculpture, commissioned by the Cass Sculpture Foundation, consists of thousands of glass rods bound together within a circular steel belt.
	Stacked Glass Sculpture	Cardinal Place 51.4975°N 0.1411°W	2005	Tony Burke	Jane Wernick Associates (engineer)	Sculpture	—N/a	The work comprises one twisting wall of stacked green glass and another curving; these are set on a cylindrical plinth.
	Route	Cardinal Place 51.4970°N 0.1406°W	2005	Joy Gerrard	—N/a	Panels set in pavement	—N/a	Nine discs of varying sizes set in the pavement of the Cardinal Place development at various points in a pedestrian's route; they are inlaid with smaller coloured discs.
	LP4	Cardinal Place 51.4978°N 0.1415°W	2005	Nathaniel Rackowe	—N/a	Kinetic sculpture	—N/a	Two slabs of oblong welded steel panels (with a gap at the top of the grid forming a "machicolation") hold in place a thin cathode light tube; the whole structure is set into a rotating turntable flush with the pavement.
More images	Statue of Anna Pavlova	Victoria Palace Theatre	2006	Harry Franchetti	Frank Matcham	Architectural sculpture	Grade II*	
More images	Statue of Queen Victoria	Victoria Square 51.4977°N 0.1449°W	2008	Catherine Anne Laugel	—N/a	Statue	—N/a	Victoria is portrayed as a young woman of 20, the age she would have been when construction on the square began.
	Back-lit fused glass boxes	InterContinental London Westminster hotel, Broadway 51.4994°N 0.1330°W	2012	Andrew Moor Associates	Dexter Moren Associates	Back-lit fused glass boxes	—N/a	
More images	Memorial to Victims of Violence	Christchurch Gardens 51.4982°N 0.1340°W	2013 (unveiled)	Jim Martins	—N/a	Commemorative stone with plaque	—N/a	Unveiled 5 June 2013.
	Wind Sculpture	Howick Place 51.4968°N 0.1371°W	2014	Yinka Shonibare	—N/a	Sculpture	—N/a	Unveiled 7 April 2014. The work simulates a piece of batik fabric (a signature material for Shonibare) billowing in the wind.
More images	Flanders Fields 1914–2014	Outside the Guards Chapel, Wellington Barracks, Birdcage Walk	2014	—N/a	Piet Blanckaert	Memorial	—N/a	The memorial garden, a gift from Belgium, was opened on 6 November 2014 by Elizabeth II; the Belgian king Philippe was also present. A low circular wall, within which is planted soil from the war cemeteries of Flanders, is inscribed with the poem "In Flanders Fields" by John McCrae.
	Underline	Victoria tube station	2015	Giles Round, Design Work Leisure	—N/a	Ceramic mural	—N/a	
More images	Power over Others is Weakness Disguised as Strength	Orchard Place	2023	Nick Hornby	—N/a	Sculpture	—N/a	Unveiled 22 June 2023. Incorporates visual quotations from the equestrian statue of Richard I outside Parliament and a curling line which interrupts the text of Laurence Sterne's Tristram Shandy.
	Endangered Species Triptych	Saga House, Allington Street		Barry Baldwin	Sidell Gibson and Associates	Architectural sculpture		

== 55 Broadway ==
Image	Title / subject	Location and coordinates	Date	Artist / designer	Architect / other	Type	Designation	Notes
	Day and Night	55 Broadway	1929	Jacob Epstein	Charles Holden			
	North Wind	55 Broadway	1928	Alfred Horace Gerrard	Charles Holden			
	North Wind	55 Broadway	1928	Eric Gill	Charles Holden			
	East Wind	55 Broadway	1928	Eric Gill	Charles Holden			
	East Wind	55 Broadway	1928	Allan G. Wyon	Charles Holden			
	South Wind	55 Broadway	1928	Eric Gill	Charles Holden			
	South Wind	55 Broadway	1928	Eric Aumonier	Charles Holden			
	West Wind	55 Broadway	1928	Samuel Rabinovitch	Charles Holden			
	West Wind	55 Broadway	1928	Henry Moore	Charles Holden			
More images	Angels of History	St James's Park tube station	2024	Hannah Quinlan, Rosie Hastings		Mosaic		

== Bibliography ==
- Baker, Margaret (2002). Discovering London Statues and Monuments. Osprey Publishing. ISBN 9780747804956.
- Blackwood, John (1989). London's Immortals: The Complete Outdoor Commemorative Statues. London and Oxford: Savoy Press. ISBN 978-0951429600.
- Bradley, Simon; Pevsner, Nikolaus (2003). London 6: Westminster. The Buildings of England. London and New Haven: Yale University Press. ISBN 978-0-300-09595-1.
- Cavanagh, Terry (2023). Public Sculpture of Kensington and Chelsea with Westminster South-West. Public Sculpture of Britain. Vol. 22. Watford: Public Statues and Sculpture Association. ISBN 978-1-8383976-2-3.
- Ovenden, Mark (2013). London Underground by Design. London: Penguin. ISBN 978-1846144172.
- Purdon, James (May 2013). "Unreal City". Apollo: The International Art Magazine. 178 (609): 60–65.
- Ward-Jackson, Philip (2011). Public Sculpture of Historic Westminster: Volume 1. Public Sculpture of Britain. Vol. 14. Liverpool: Liverpool University Press. ISBN 978-1-84631-691-3.
- Westminster City Council (11 April 2006). Conservation Area Audit: Grosvenor Gardens (PDF).
- ——— (5 September 2008). Conservation Area Audit: Westminster Cathedral (PDF).
