= Statue of Harold Alexander =

Statue in Wellington Barracks, London

Coordinates: 51.500445°N 0.135952°W

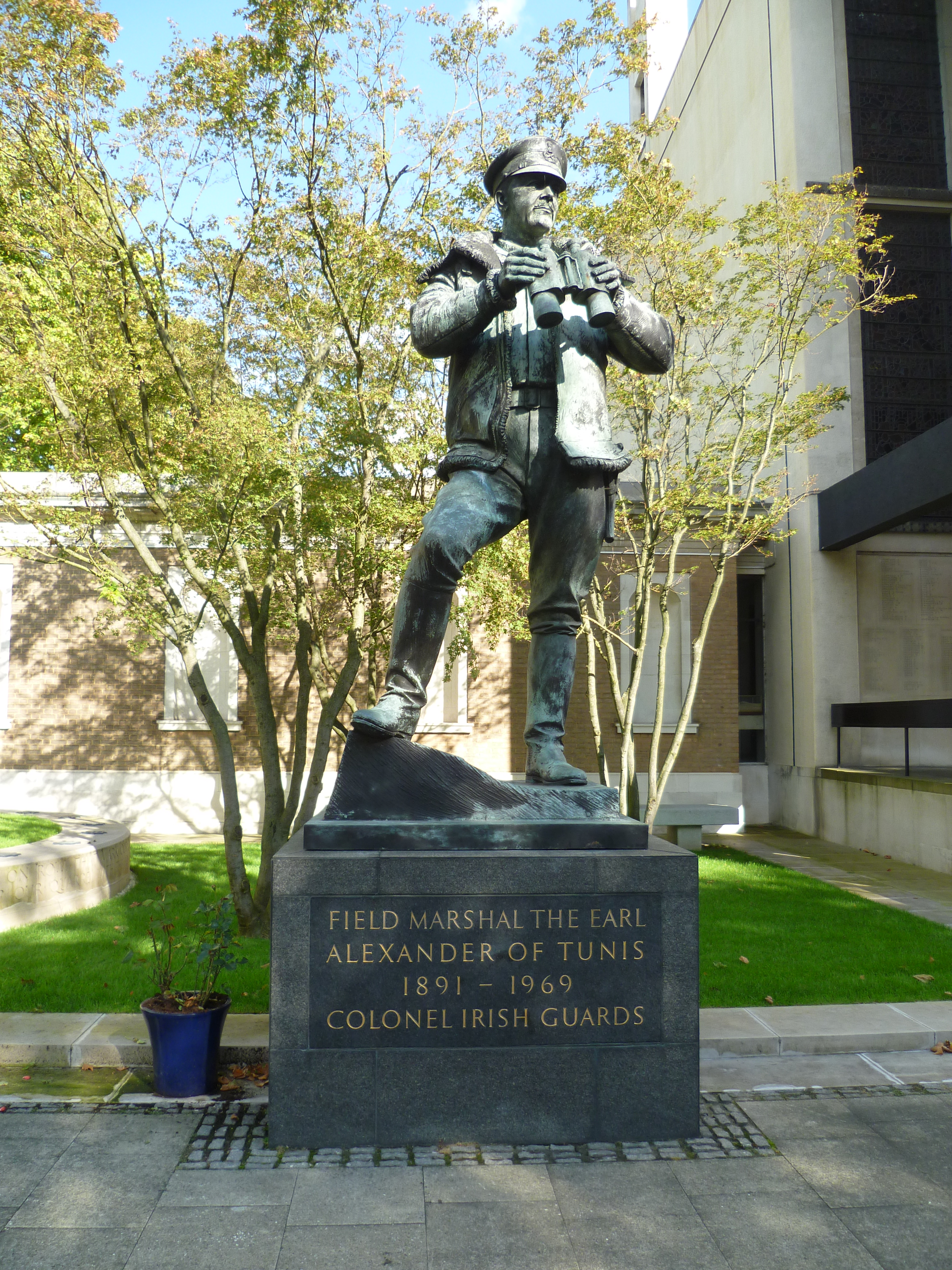
Harold Alexander, 1st Earl Alexander of Tunis

The Statue of Harold Alexander, 1st Earl Alexander of Tunis stands in the grounds of Wellington Barracks by the Flanders Fields Memorial Garden and Guards Chapel.

== Background ==
Harold Alexander was a Colonel of the Irish Guards, known for his calmness and jovial attitude to leadership. He was popular with his men, caring to spend much time with them. Kipling wrote of him, "He had the gift of handling the men in the lines to which they most readily responded. At the worst crises he was both inventive and cordial and, on such occasions as they all strove together in the gates of death, would somehow contrive to dress the affair in high comedy".

Alexander served in the First World War, commanding a battalion at the age of 26, and in the Second World War organised the withdrawal from Dunkirk and was involved in the retreat from Burma. He would also serve as overall commander of the Sicilian and Italian campaigns, and Commander-in-Chief in North Africa. Roles he held after the war included Governor-General of Canada and Minister of Defence.

== Statue ==
The statue is by James Butler. Rendered in bronze, it depicts Alexander in a sheepskin jacket and military gear, an outfit characteristic of his time in Italy. Butler studied old film of Alexander in an effort to produce a sculpture reflecting the character of Alexander. His particular pose was conveying of this.

It was unveiled in 1985 by Queen Elizabeth II, and marked the conclusion of a 22 year project for the rebuilding of the London headquarters of the five regiments of the footguards. For his work on the statue, Butler received the silver medal of the Royal Society of British Sculptors.
