= Grosvenor Gardens House =

Apartment block in London, England

Coordinates: 51.4971°N 0.1454°W

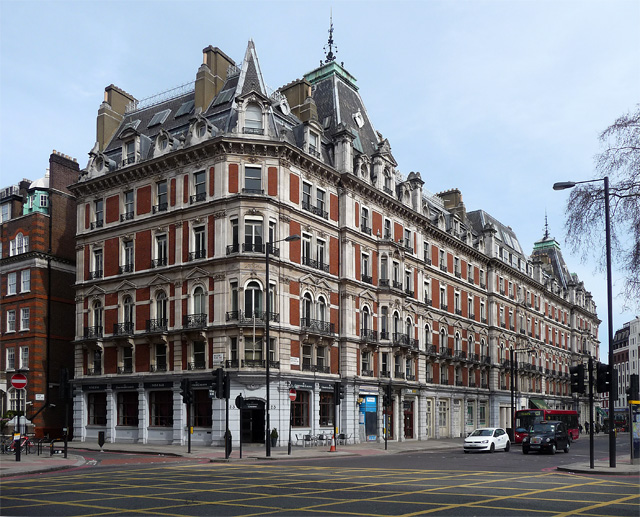
Grosvenor Gardens House

Grosvenor Gardens House is a Grade II-listed mansion block at 23–47 Grosvenor Gardens, Belgravia, London. Queen Elizabeth the Queen Mother may have been born there in 1900. David Niven was born there in 1910, and William Henry Blackmore killed himself there in 1878.

In 2017, the ownership of the building was the subject of a £132-million High Court trial for damages brought against Christian and Nick Candy by Mark Holyoake, a former friend and business associate who had financed the purchase of the property via a loan from the brothers. The action was unsuccessful, but the course of the trial put the Candys' business practices under an unflattering spotlight.

== History ==
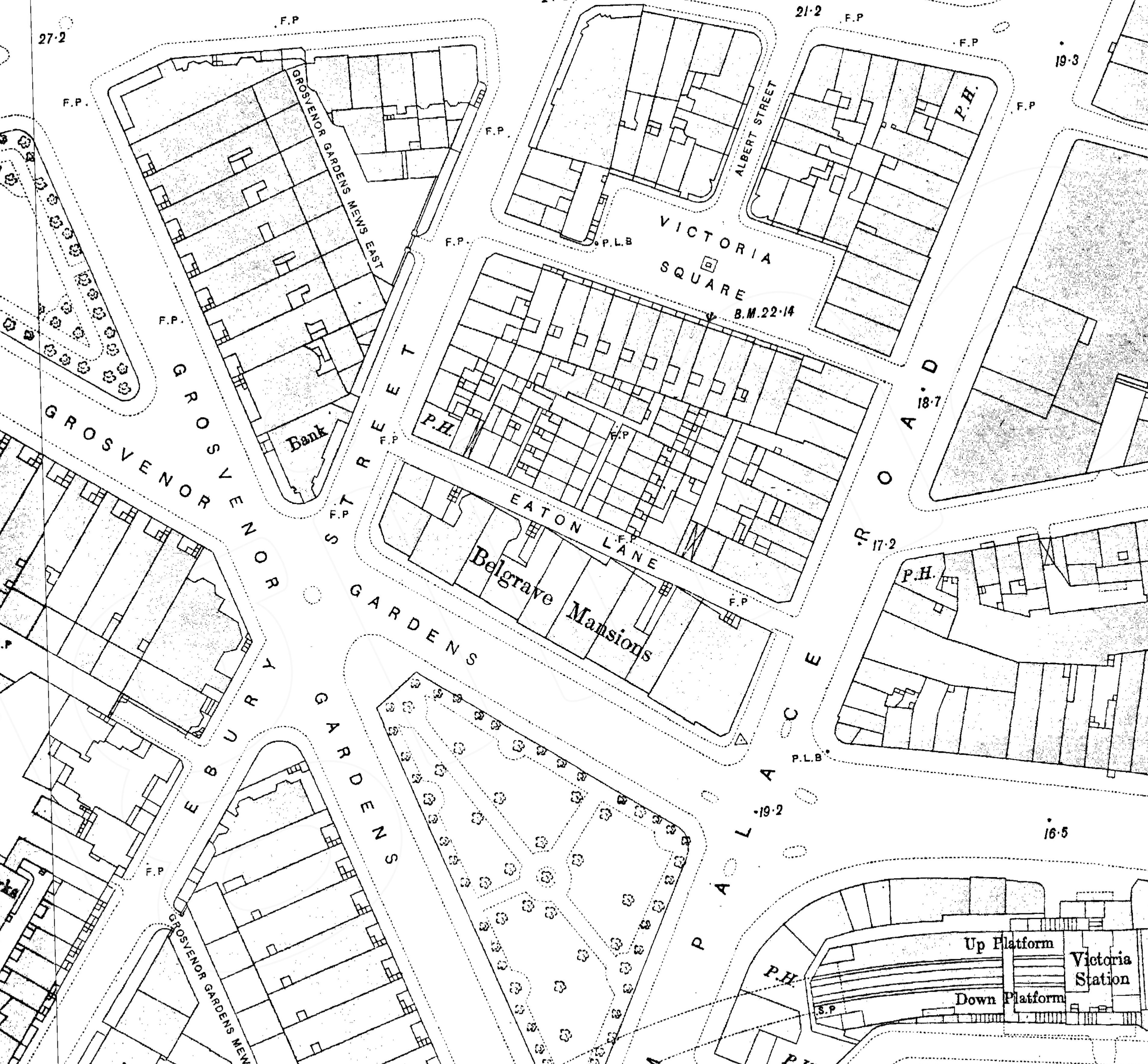
Belgrave Mansions on a 1910s Ordnance Survey map

Grosvenor Gardens House was originally named Belgrave Mansions when it was completed in 1868. The building, which was London's first serviced apartment block, was designed by the architect Thomas Cundy III in the French Renaissance style. Its original name is derived from Belgrave, Cheshire, which is one of the subsidiary titles held by the Dukes of Westminster, the area's principal landowners.

During World War One Grosvenor Gardens House was placed at the disposal of the American Expeditionary Force, along with the nearby Goring Hotel. It was converted into a hotel in the 1920s, and then into offices in the 1930s.

In 2011, the 125,000-square-foot (11,600 m^{2}) full street block was purchased by Oakvest, and in 2013 Westminster City Council granted planning permission for conversion into 42 luxury flats, subject to a £7.1 million financial contribution to the Council's affordable housing fund.

== Notable residents ==
In 1878, lawyer and philanthropist William Henry Blackmore (1827–1878), killed himself with a pistol in his study at Belgrave Mansions after suffering severe financial loss from bad business investments.

Queen Elizabeth the Queen Mother's 1900 birthplace remains uncertain but Belgrave Mansions is one of the leading contenders. Her paternal grandparents rented apartments in the building and it's where her parents Lord and Lady Glamis stayed when in London.

Other notable residents have included the actor David Niven, who was born there in 1910, as well as William Adolph Baillie-Grohman, the Austrian adventurer, writer and big game hunter. Lieutenant General Sir Lewis Pelly (1825–1892), the army officer and member of Parliament, lived there.

== Legal action ==
Between March and December 2017, the building lay at the centre of a £132-million High Court trial for damages brought against Christian and Nick Candy by the entrepreneur Mark Holyoake. Found against the plaintiff, December 2017, and refused appeal, June 2018..
