= Mount Blackmore =

Mountain in Montana, United States

- Aerial view of Mount Blackmore in autumn

Highest point
- Elevation: 10,154 ft (3,095 m)
- Coordinates: 45°26′40″N 111°00′10″W

Geography
- Location within Montana
- Location: Gallatin County, Montana, U.S.'
- Parent range: Gallatin Range
- Topo map: USGS Mount Blackmore

Climbing
- Easiest route: Hike

Mount Blackmore is located in Gallatin National Forest, in the U.S. state of Montana. Bozeman is located near the East Gallatin River, Gallatin County, Mount Blackmore is south of the City of Bozeman in the Gallatin Range.

Ferdinand Vandeveer Hayden's survey expedition of the Yellowstone area named the peak for Mary Blackmore, wife of William Blackmore, an English land speculator and philanthropist who accompanied the Hayden Survey. Mary Blackmore contracted pneumonia and died in Bozeman, Montana during the early summer of 1872.
