= Antonio Zeno Shindler =

Bulgarian-born American painter and photographer (c.1823–1899)

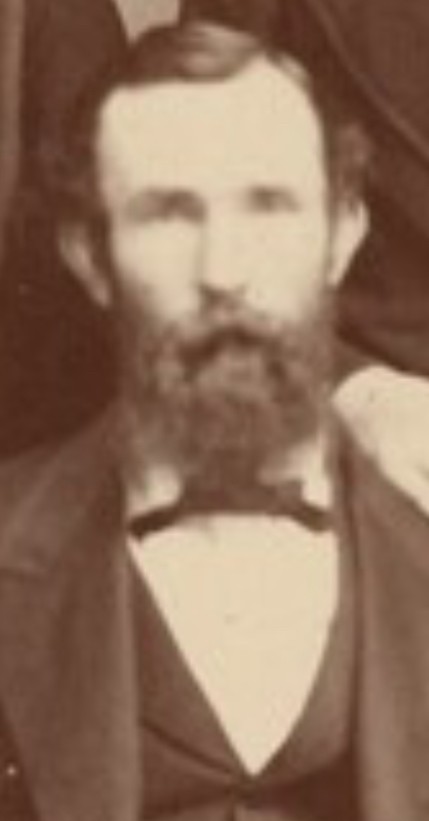
Shindler in 1868

Antonio Zeno Shindler (c. 1823 – August 8, 1899) was a Bulgarian-born American photographer and painter.

Born c. 1823, as Antonio Zeno, Shindler studied art in Paris, moving to the United States with anthropologist William Henry Blackmore c. 1845. While in the United States, he lived in Philadelphia, working as a professor for the Pennsylvania Academy of the Fine Arts. In 1852, he married Justina Fontaine, having one daughter together. He later moved to Washington, D.C. He worked for the Smithsonian American Art Museum. In 1867, Blackmore loaned his photograph collection to Shindler, some of which were used to the Smithsonian's first photograph exhibit. He died on August 8, 1899, in Washington, D.C, from injuries sustained after falling off a streetcar.

== Gallery ==
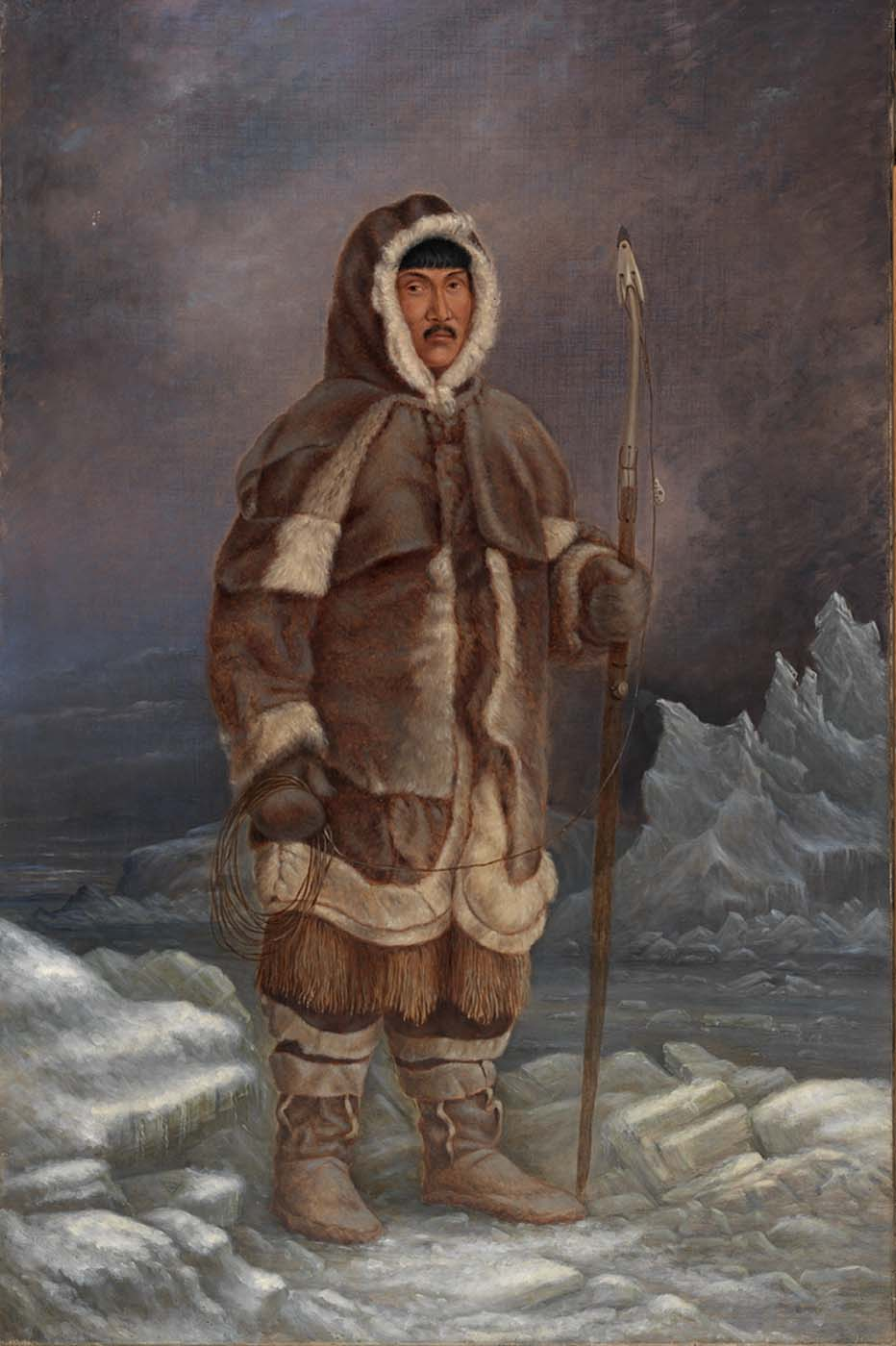
Eskimo Man (c. 1893)

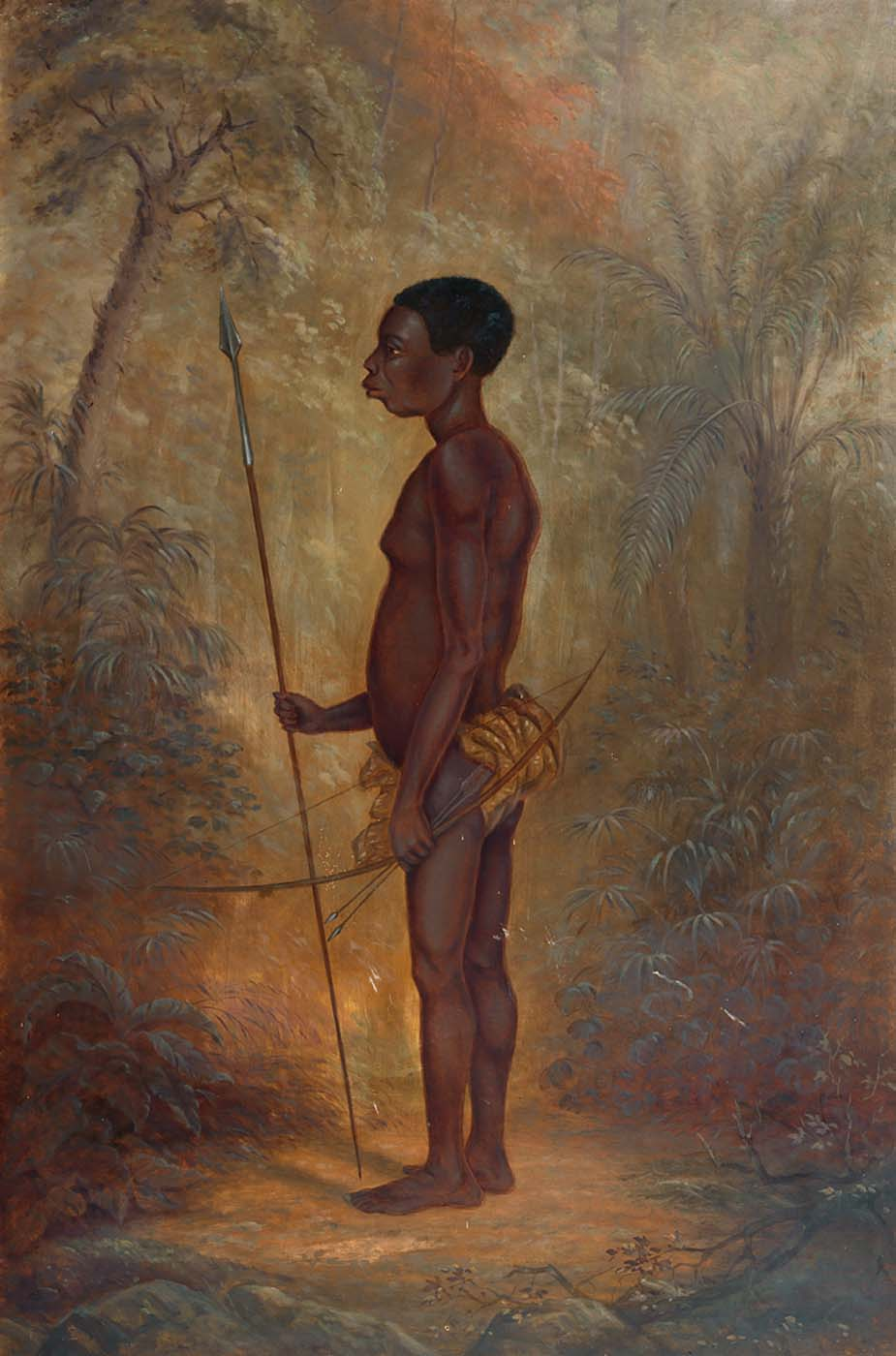
Akka Man (c. 1893)

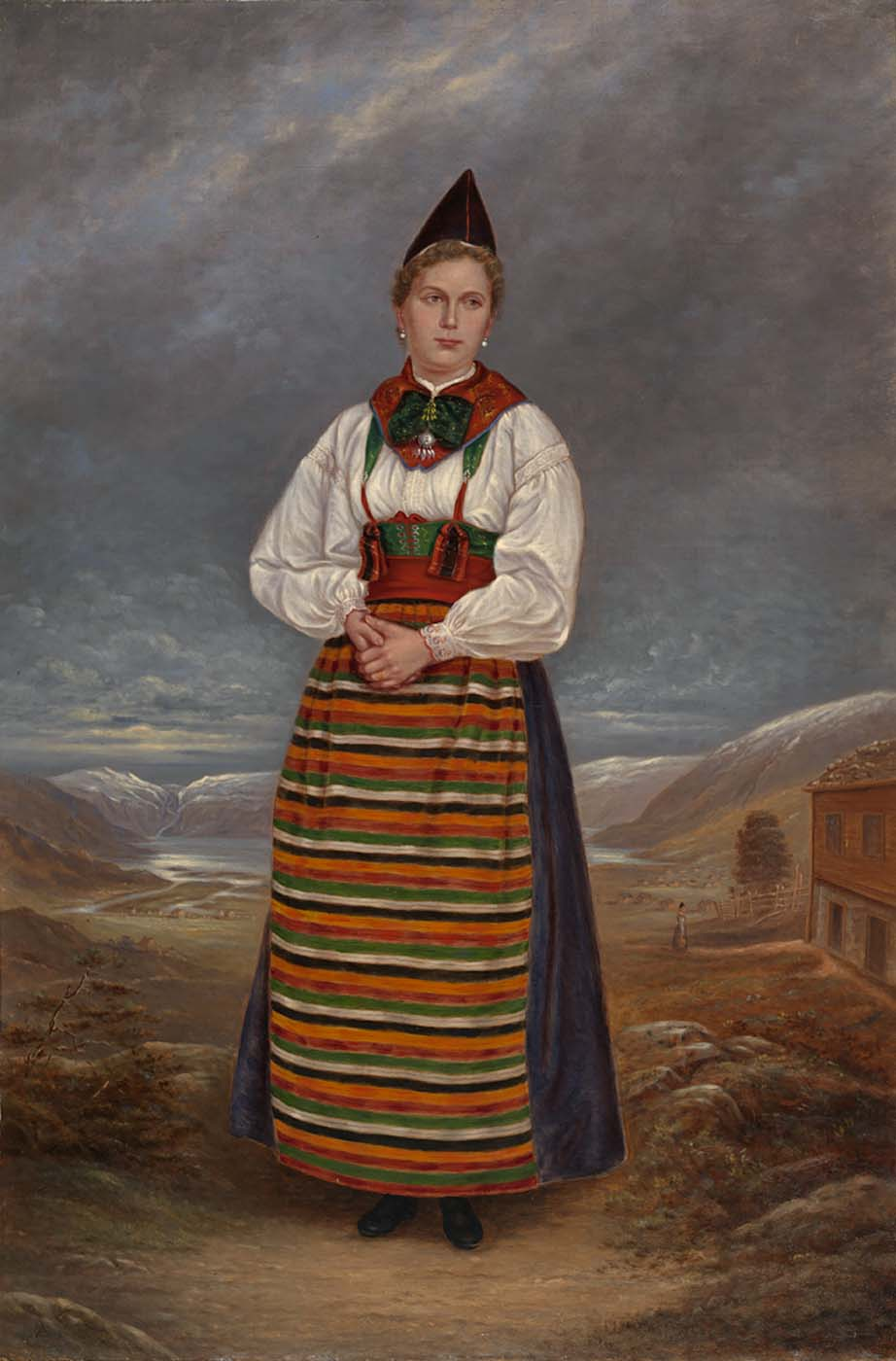
Swedish Lady (c. 1893)

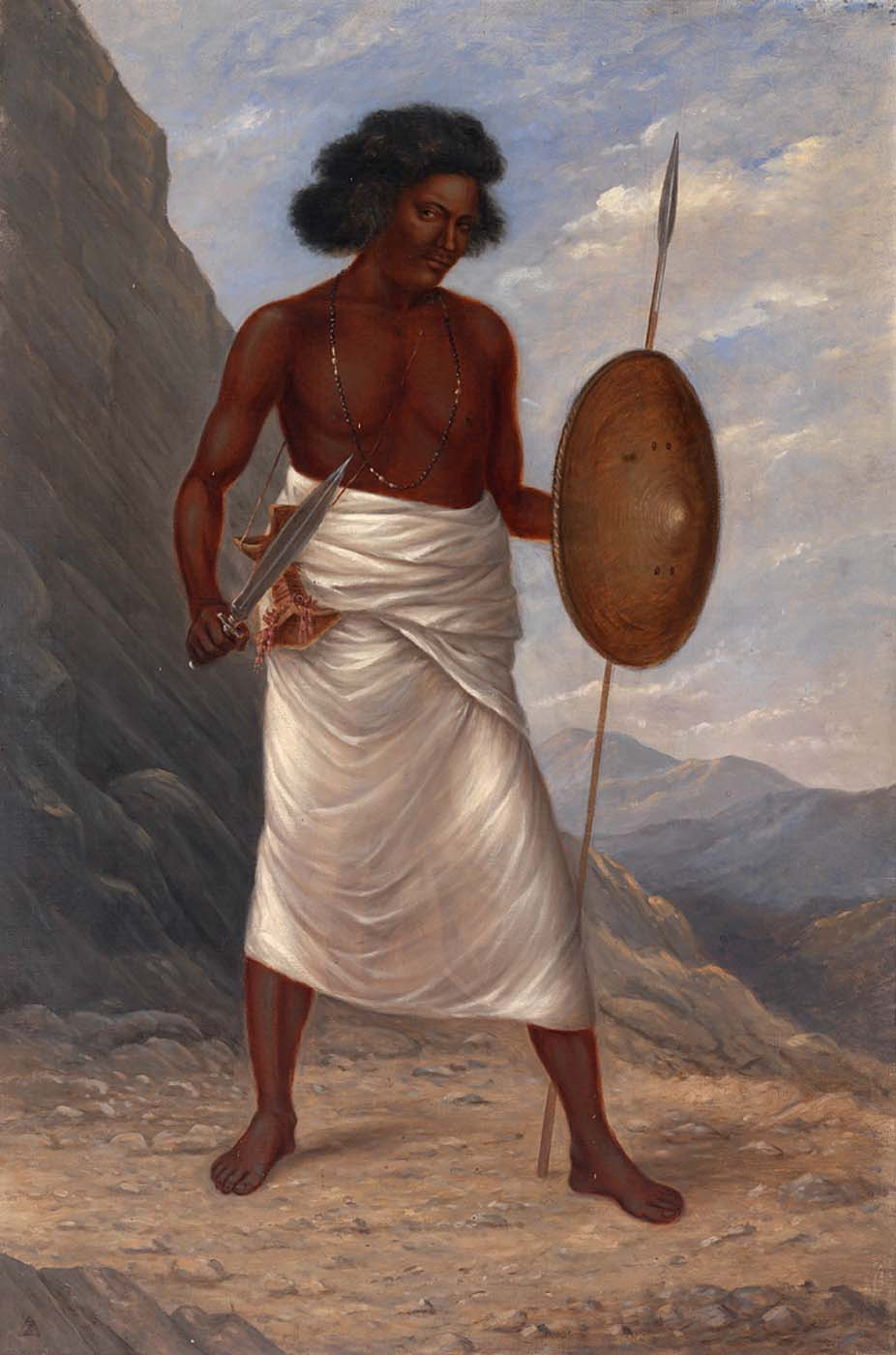
Somali Man (c. 1893)

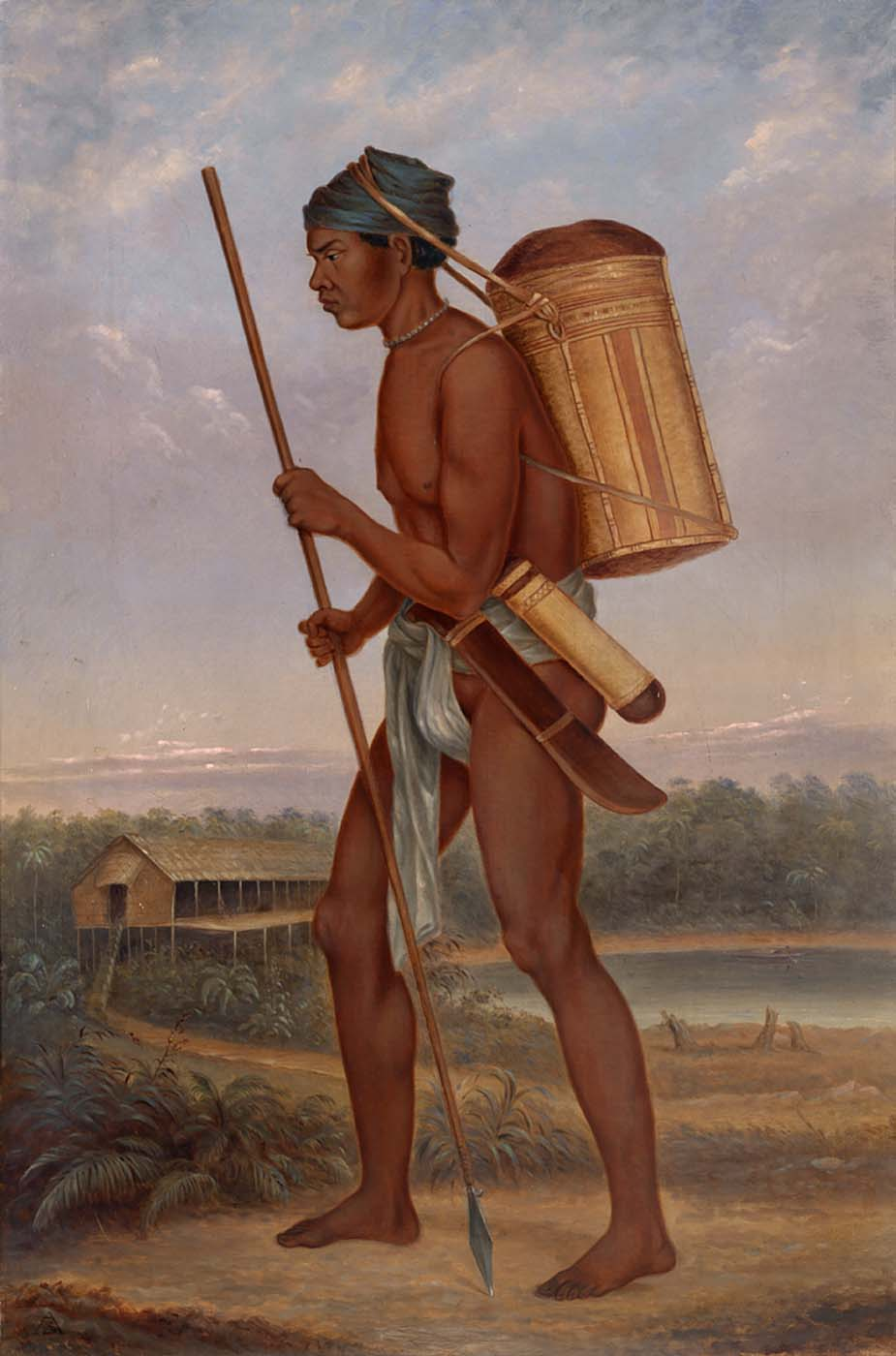
Diak Man (c. 1893)
