= The Guards Museum =

Military museum in London, England

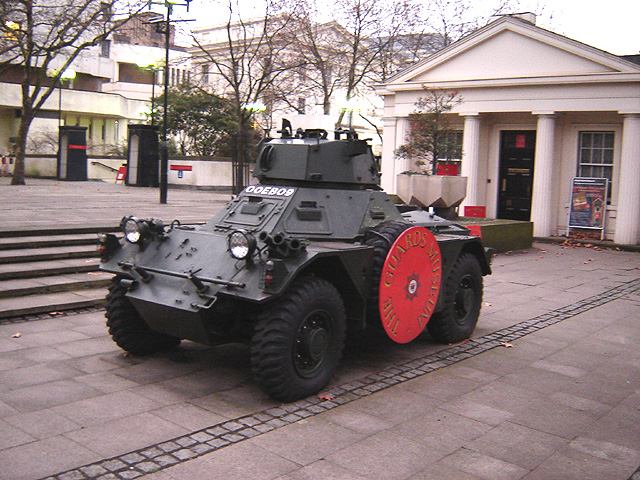
- A Ferret armoured car on display outside the Guards Museum (January 2006)

- Shown in Westminster
- Established: 1988
- Location: Wellington Barracks
- Coordinates: 51.500063°N 0.136152°W
- Type: Military
- Website: www.theguardsmuseum.com

The Guards Museum is a military museum in Central London, England. It is in Wellington Barracks on Birdcage Walk near Buckingham Palace. The barracks are the home of the five regiments of Foot Guards (the Grenadier Guards, Coldstream Guards, Scots Guards, Irish Guards, and Welsh Guards).

== Overview ==
The museum opened in 1988. It tells the story of the regiments it represents, from the 17th century to the present day. The displays include a range of different Guards uniforms, illustrating how the uniforms of the five regiments have evolved over time. There are also paintings, weapons, models, sculptures, and artefacts such as mess silver – all intended to explain the history of the regiments and the experience of serving in the Guards.
