= William Henry Blackmore =

English lawyer (1827–1878)

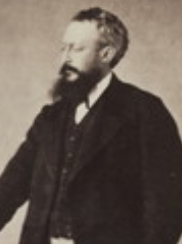
Blackmore in 1872

William Henry Blackmore (2 August 1827 – 12 April 1878) was an English lawyer who gained a fortune by exploiting a large social network as an investment promoter. He used his fortune for philanthropy, primarily centred on his interest in Native Americans, but ended his life after a failed investment deal related to the Denver and Rio Grande Western Railroad.

== Lawyer ==
Blackmore was born 2 August 1827 in Salisbury, Wiltshire, England, to a family claiming descent from the family of Sir Richard Blackmore, the English poet and physician. His grandfather, The Reverend Richard Blackmore, was Rector of Donhead St Mary located on the edge of the Blackmore Vale. He attended King's College, Bruton, a public school in the neighbouring county of Somerset and then was articled to his uncle John Lambert of the Salisbury firm of solicitors Lambert and Norton. After qualifying in 1848 Henry joined the firm of solicitors Duncan, Squarey and Duncan in Liverpool, England and soon became a full partner of Duncan, Squarey and Blackmore. He was elected as a member of the American Philosophical Society in 1869.

== Social network and venture capitalisation ==
Through several maritime compensation cases Blackmore developed contacts with Americans and their representatives; as well as British and European, investors, business and political leaders. An American lawyer, Cyrus Martin Fisher, showed Blackmore the large and immediate returns to assisting ventures to find capital. To this end Blackmore found his family and business connections useful. In each deal the promoter either took fees, stock or both in exchange for placing bonds or shares with investors. He opened a second office in Founder's Court, Lothbury, London, had success in ventures in Europe and Africa and became well known in British and European investment circles.

On 14 May 1851, Blackmore married Mary Sidford. The couple entertained many prominent people of the time at Shepley House in Carshalton, south of London, including: Oliver Wendell Holmes Sr., Alfred, Lord Tennyson, "Mark Twain", John Russell Bartlett, John Evans, Arthur Church, Ernest Griset, John Lubbock, 3rd Baronet, Colonel Lane Fox, Joseph W. Prestwick, and Charlotte Brontë.

=== American investment ===
On his first trip to America, 1863, Blackmore met with investors in New York and they developed a plan for investments in lands in Virginia, headed to Washington, D.C. in early 1864 with letters of introduction to senators, congressmen and President Abraham Lincoln. Blackmore made several trips to the United States to find investment opportunities, making additional deals with lands in Colorado and New Mexico and forming railway companies.

General William Jackson Palmer needed financing for the Denver and Rio Grande Railroad which Blackmore placed primarily with a party of Dutch bankers. Blackmore became an investor in the United States Freehold Land and Emigration Company Limited which promoted emigration, particularly from the Netherlands and Germany, to the 500,000-acre (2,000 km^{2}) Costilla Estate in the San Luis Valley, Colorado Territory.

=== Social network extends ===
In January 1864, while in New York meeting with investors Blackmore attended the opera as the guest of August Belmont.

In fall 1868, Blackmore travelled west to inspect the completion of the transcontinental railroad, locate likely mining ventures and to investigate the Mormons. At the start of the trip Colonel Edward Bridges and Blackmore participated in a buffalo hunt organised by General Henry B. Carrington. On the train they joined Government commissioners, Mitchell and Latham, Thomas C. Durant, Grenville M. Dodge, Samuel B. Reed, Colonel Silas Seymour, Colonel Richard Irving Dodge and Professor Ferdinand Hayden. West of Laramie, Wyoming, Blackmore and Bridges left the train to travel to Salt Lake City, Utah to make confidential reports to unidentified industrial leaders and the British Cabinet. There was much publicity in the eastern states that the Mormons would not trade with non-Mormons, and in Britain there were concerns raised on the large numbers of British subjects who had left to join the Mormons in Utah. From 6 to 10 October 1868, John Willard Young escorted the men providing information and guiding them around the area. Others they met with include Bishop John Sharpe, David Durant, William Henry Hooper, President Brigham Young and his son Joseph Angell Young.

On a trip to the US aboard the SS Russia in 1871 with Generals Sheridan, Forsyth, and Ledlie, Blackmore was introduced to Abraham Lincoln's widow and son, Robert Todd Lincoln. Robert later became involved in one of Blackmore's land deals.

== Philanthropy ==
From the mid-1840s, archaeologists Ephraim George Squier (1821–1888) and Edwin Hamilton Davis (1811–1888) excavated artefacts from mounds discovered in the Mississippi and Ohio valley, to form the so-called Squier-Davis collection. They had written a manuscript discussing their findings but did not have the funds to publish it.

Having been unsuccessful in his efforts to sell the 1300-piece Mound City Group collection to the Smithsonian Institution or the New York Historical Society, Davis prepared a catalogue featuring his cumulative collections and placed them up for sale on the open market. The catalogue included not only Ohio antiquities, but those from his excavations in Peru, Central America, and Denmark as well. Davis preferred having the collection remain in the United States, but no American institution came forward to make a serious monetary offer. In 1864 Blackmore acquired the entire collection of native American archaeological artefacts excavated from the mounds in the Mississippi valley, including the Squier-Davis collection. He purchased this collection from Davis for US$10,000.

Blackmore founded the Blackmore Museum in Salisbury which opened in a lavish ceremony on 4 September 1867. Dr. Humphrey Purnell Blackmore (1822–1929) and Blackmore's brother in law Edward Thomas Stevens (1828–1878) were the museum's honorary curators. Since the museum collections included the Squier and Davis collections it appears to have become something of a place of pilgrimage for American archaeologists. The 1907 edition of the Encyclopædia Britannica described the museum as "one of the finest collections of prehistoric antiquities in England." In 1899, the eminent George Amos Dorsey (1868–1931) wrote; "The Blackmore Museum of Salisbury contains one of the best selected and arranged collections of man's prehistoric relics that I have ever seen."

Blackmore significantly sponsored the 1872 survey expedition of the Yellowstone region led by Ferdinand Hayden, also funding equipment for photographer William Henry Jackson and painter Thomas Moran. Blackmore and his wife travelled with the expedition. Hayden named a newly discovered mineral Blackmorite in thanks for Blackmore's support.

Blackmore commissioned photographers like Jackson to photograph Native Americans. Some accompanied the survey expeditions, some he contacted and acquired their existing prints and some made portraits of natives visiting Washington. The work of some twenty-eight photographers were to be found in Blackmore's photographic collection. These included Antonio Zeno Shindler, Alexander Gardner, Orloff R. Westman, and William Abraham Bell. The collections also included commercially available carte de visites and stereoscopic views.

Blackmore took prints for display at the museum but asked that the negatives be left for students to study. The original set of photographs is referred to as the Blackmore Collection. Some photographers continued to make portraits after Blackmore left and those expanded were named for the photographer.

His brother, Humphrey Purnell Blackmore, a physician, surgeon and archaeologist was one of the founders of the Salisbury and South Wiltshire Museum which was primarily dedicated to local artefacts. In 1902 the two museums were amalgamated, taking the latter name. Following Humphrey Blackmore's death, a significant number of Blackmore Museum artefacts were distributed to other museums including the Smithsonian Institution, the Birmingham Museum, and the British Museum. In 1932, Barbara Freire-Marreco Aitken (1879–1967), a prominent anthropologist who had worked with the innovative educator and passionate amateur archaeologist Edgar Lee Hewett (1865–1946), secured a substantial set of Blackmore's papers relating to his activities in New Mexico for the Historical Society of New Mexico. This material also included some 112 photographs in carte de visite, stereoscopic, Cabinet and other formats. Blackmore's museum, whose name had become incorporated with that of the Salisbury and South Wiltshire Museum after his death – and amalgamated in 1902 – finally disappeared in 1968. The remnants of his museum moved from its purpose built setting adjoining the Salisbury and South Wiltshire Museum in St. Ann Street to The King's House in the Cathedral Close in 1981 and the building was subsequently converted into residential apartments.

== Death ==
While on the expedition to Yellowstone in July 1872, Blackmore's wife Mary contracted pneumonia and died in Bozeman, Montana. Blackmore purchased land and donated it to the town for a cemetery. Ferdinand Hayden named Mount Blackmore in Mary's honour.

In 1871, he sent his brother Henry and cousin George Blackmore and their families to look after lands in Colorado. A world recession hit in 1873, investors became agitated, American partners were taking advantage of Blackmore's absence leading to a stressful situation for the promoter. In 1877, his sister Blanche and her husband Arthur Boyle (1840–1910), whom she had married in that year, emigrated to America to look after Blackmore's property in New Mexico. Back in England Blackmore was suffering from a fall, overwork, lack of rest and over-indulgence. Humphrey prescribed some time away in the South of England. However, after a drinking binge he suffered from sun stroke, returning home in worse condition. Blackmore's business investments fell into more and more precarious states. He was unable to raise funding to travel to the USA to sort matters out. On 12 April 1878, Blackmore shot himself in his study at Belgrave Mansions, Grosvenor Gardens, Westminster, near Victoria Station. At his own request, he was buried on 20 April in Brompton Cemetery, London.

== Published work ==
- Colorado: Its Resources, Parks, and Prospects as a New Field for Emigration, with and Account of the Trenchara and Costilla Estates, in the San Luis Park. Published by Sampson Low, Son and Marston, 1869, London.
- A brief account of the North American Indians and particularly of the hostile tribes of the plains; principal Indian events since 1862; causes of Indian wars; Indian atrocities and western reprisals; and war of extermination now being waged between the white and red men. An Introduction to Col. Richard Irving Dodge's Hunting Grounds of the Great West. Chatto & Windus, 1877, London.
