= Richard Irving Dodge =

United States Army officer (1827–1895)

- Richard Irving Dodge
- Born: May 19, 1827; Huntsville, North Carolina, US
- Died: June 16, 1895 (aged 68); Sacketts Harbor, New York, US
- Burial place: Arlington National Cemetery
- Military career
- Allegiance: United States
- Branch: United States Army
- Service years: 1848–1891
- Rank: Colonel
- Commands: 11th U.S. Infantry
- Conflicts: American Civil War; Indian Wars

Richard Irving Dodge (May 19, 1827 – June 16, 1895) was a colonel in the United States Army. Dodge was born in North Carolina and died after a long and successful career in the U.S. Army. He began as a cadet in 1844 and retired as a Colonel May 19, 1891.

Dodge was Aide-De-Camp to General William Tecumseh Sherman from 1881 to 1882. In the second publishing of his memoirs General Sherman wrote, "... the vacancy made by Colonel McCook was filled by Lieutenant-Colonel Richard Irving Dodge, Twenty-third Infantry then serving at a cantonment on the Upper Canadian—an officer who had performed cheerfully and well a full measure of frontier service, was a capital sportsman, and of a perfect war record. He also remained with me until his promotion as Colonel of the Eleventh Infantry, 26 January 1882."

== Life ==
Dodge was born in Huntsville, North Carolina, in what was then Surry County, now Yadkin County. He was the eldest child and only son of James Richard Dodge and Susan Williams Dodge. His maternal grandparents were Maj. Joseph Williams and Susannah Martin Taylor. His paternal grandparents were Gen. Richard Dodge and Anne Sarah Irving. Anne was the sister of Washington Irving.

Dodge married into a distinguished military and political family on March 3, 1858, in New York City. His wife, Julia Rhinelander Paulding, was the granddaughter of General William Paulding of the War of 1812 and one time Mayor of New York City, and the great-granddaughter of General William Paulding of the American Revolution and one of the first members of the Provincial Congress. The author and Secretary of the Navy under president Van Buren, James Kirke Paulding, was Julia's great uncle. John Paulding, a captor of the British spy John André, was a cousin of her grandfather.

Dodge and his wife Julia are buried at Arlington National Cemetery.

== Three Dodges in Kansas ==
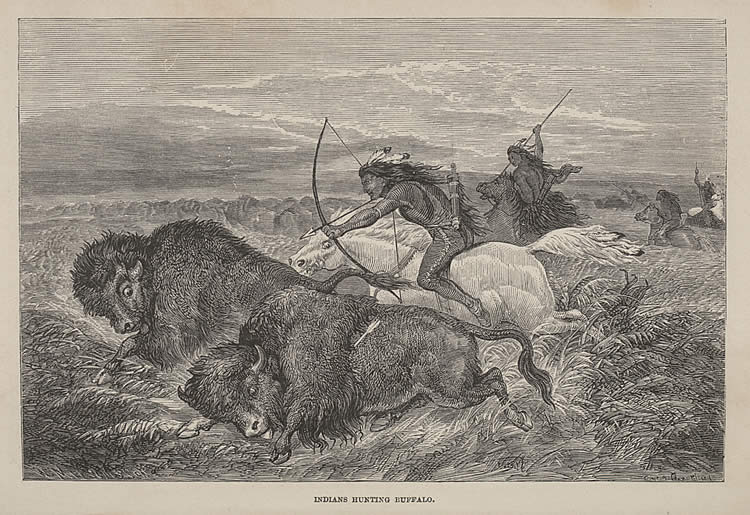
Plate from Dodge's Hunting Grounds of the Great West, 1877

To protect settlers traveling to the American west the army set up camps and forts along the favored routes. In Kansas in 1851 on the Santa Fe Trail a Colonel I. Dodge established Fort Dodge which lasted a short time. In 1864, General Grenville M. Dodge established a large fort in the same area on the north bank of the Arkansas River. The site was selected by Col. James Hobart Ford for whom the county was later named, and the fort was named Fort Dodge in the General's honor. "Fort Dodge was one of the most important forts on the Western frontier." Commanders at the fort included George Custer and Col. William H. Lewis. In July 1872, Richard Irving Dodge was in command at Fort Dodge and the Atchison, Topeka and Santa Fe Railway needed a station on the Arkansas River. A site was selected five miles west of the fort and a town company organized by Dodge and his officers, R.M. Wright was elected president, and the quartermaster, Major E. B. Kirk, was secretary and treasurer. The town was named Dodge City after Fort Dodge (US Army Post). Dodge City later became famous for its wildness, its Boot Hill cemetery, and gunslinging lawmen like Wyatt Earp and Bat Masterson.

== Devil's Tower ==
A 1906 presidential proclamation named a butte in Wyoming as Devil's Tower National Monument based on the description of it by Lieutenant Colonel Richard Irving Dodge in 1875. There has been a dispute over the name since that time.

== Published work ==
- Hunting Grounds of the Great West Published by Chatto & Windus, 1877, London. (Introduction by William Henry Blackmore.)
- Our Wild Indians, A. D. Worthington and Company, 1883, Hartford, Conn. (Introduction by General Sherman.)
- The Enlisted Soldier, 1886.
- The Black Hills: A Minute Description of the Routes, Scenery, Soil, Climate, Timber, Gold, Geology, Zoölogy, etc., With an Accurate Map, Four Sectional Drawings, and Ten Plates from Photographs, Taken on the Spot. Minneapolis: Ross & Haines, Inc., 1965. Facsimile reprint of 1876 edition.
- The Powder River Expedition Journals of Colonel Richard Irving Dodge, Edited by Wayne R. Kime, University of Oklahoma Press 1997.
- The Indian Territory Journals of Colonel Richard Irving Dodge, Edited by Wayne R. Kime, University of Oklahoma Press, 2000.
- The Sherman Tour Journals of Colonel Richard Irving Dodge, Edited by Wayne R. Kime, University of Oklahoma Press, 2002.
- Kime, Wayne R. (ed.), Colonel Richard Irving Dodge: The Life And Times of a Career Army Officer, University of Oklahoma Press, 2006.ISBN 978-0-8061-3709-4
