= Jonathan Kenworthy =

British sculptor (born 1943)

- Born: 23 June 1943 (age 83); Windermere, Westmorland

Jonathan Martin Kenworthy (born 23 June 1943) is a British sculptor and Fellow of the Royal Society of British Sculptors.

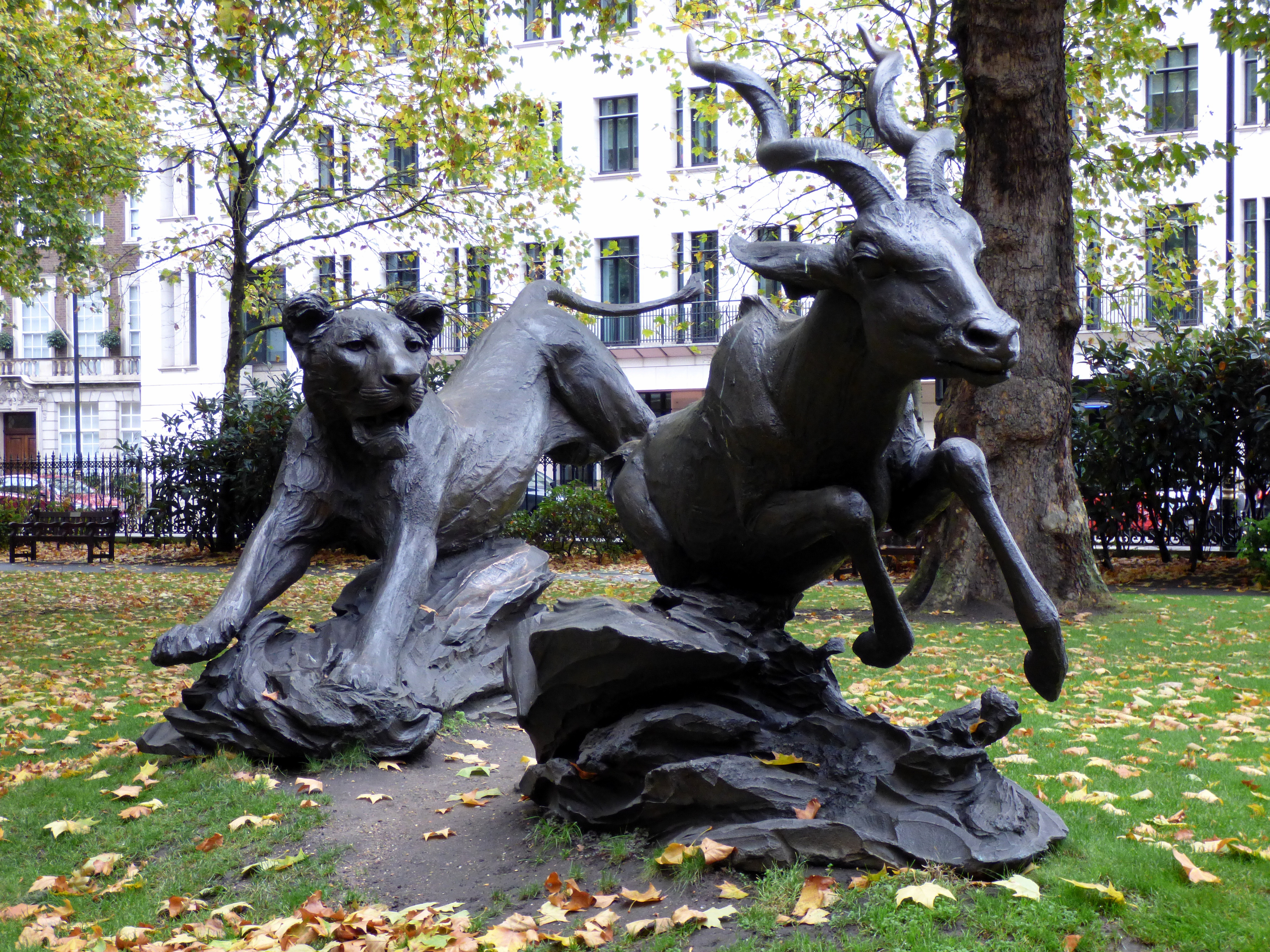
Lioness and Lesser Kudu located in Grosvenor Gardens, London

== Biography ==
Aged eleven, Kenworthy attended the Royal College of Art in London under the tutelage of Professor John Skeaping. Kenworthy also went to the Kingston Grammar School, dividing his time between school and the sculpture schools of the Royal College. He then spent two years at the Wimbledon College of Art before entering the Royal Academy Schools in 1961, spending four years in the School of Sculpture.

In 1965, Kenworthy had his first exhibition with the Tryon Gallery, Mayfair, London. His life-size carving in black Kellymount limestone of a Stalking Leopard was bought by Mr & Mrs Russell Byers and presented to the Carnegie Museum in Pittsburgh. He exhibited in South Africa with Everard Read at the Pieter Wenning Gallery in Johannesburg in 1966, and at the Incurable Collector in New York where his carving of a Roaring Lion in Blu Turqu Marble was sold to a private collector.

In 1969, following annual study tours to East Africa, Kenworthy won the Elizabeth Greenshields Foundation award and had his first solo exhibition in London: Jonathan Kenworthy Bronzes and Drawings: Movement and Wildlife in Africa, at the Tryon Gallery followed by Impressions of Africa in 1971, and Kenworthy '75 – Cheetah Hunting Series, Baboons and Nomads. In 1976, Kenworthy's Kenya, a one-hour television programme for World About Us, was aired for the first time on the BBC. The programme was produced by George Inger.

Kenworthy's first one-man show in New York was held at the Coe Kerr Gallery in Manhattan's Upper East Side, following his trip to Afghanistan in 1977. This exhibition, Horsemen of the Hindu Kush, contained a collection of bronzes, studies and drawings of the Afghan horsemen playing the ancient game of buzkashi. The ensuing exhibitions were People of the Desert: Nomads of East Africa in 1985 and Survival in the Serengeti, 1991, Coe Kerr Gallery, New York.

During the 1990s, Kenworthy worked on a thirty-foot sculpture of the Lioness and Lesser Kudu, a commission for the Duke of Westminster. Kenworthy carved the sculptures out of blocks of polystyrene, the models were cast by the Meridan Bronze Foundry in London in 1998. One casting sits on a hundred foot long oval pond at Eaton Hall, Cheshire, and the second is in Upper Grosvenor Gardens in London.

Apart from an early commission for writer Ernest Hemingway's widow, Mary Hemingway, for her husband's grave in Ketchum, Idaho and later The Leopard, for Paul Wates, Kenworthy does not normally work to commission, preferring instead to develop a theme and a body of work for exhibition. He sketches while on safari and uses drawing to develop his ideas in the studio; his exhibitions always include some drawings to accompany the sculptures.

In 2002 he exhibited at the Gerald Peters Gallery, New York, Rhythms of Life, a collection of bronzes and drawings with subjects including : Afghan women walking in Kabul, African tribesmen, a Dinka with a pipe, a Turkana with his sons, a Stretching Tiger from Nepal, a Kuchi couple on horseback on the road to Jalalabad, and a sculpture of Horus at the Temple of Edfu, entitled Yesterday's Gods. A catalogue raisonne of his work, Jonathan Kenworthy Sculpture and Works on Paper, was published by LionTree Publications in 2007.

He continues to travel and work at his studio in Surrey, casting his bronzes with Pangolin Editions foundry in Stroud. His most recent works include mountain gorillas cast in bronze or silver ( British Silver Week at Chatsworth, 2009), a large seated Warthog (Portland Gallery, 2007) and Nomads: three larger bronzes of a Samburu Moran (Warrior) (Crucible Exhibition 2010, Gloucester Cathedral), Masai Boy with Goat and a Somali Woman and child, (Tryon Gallery, London, 2011).

A retrospective exhibition entitled 'Six Decades of Sculpture' was held at the Pangolin London, 90 York Way, London from March until April 2013. The exhibition was reviewed by William Packer in the Times on 6 April 2013 – 'Jonathan Kenworthy is, at 70, one of England's most remarkable modern sculptors, and also one of its most successful'.

== Books and articles ==
- Jonathan Kenworthy Sculpture and Works on Paper by James Silbert, Photography Steve Russell, Published by LionTree Publications, 2007.
- Animals in Bronze by Christopher Payne 1986 Published by Antique Collectors Club
- Mud Fire Metal Bronze Sculpture Casting & Patination Published by Schiffer Publishing Ltd, 2002
- The Connoisseur Magazine The Shape of the Action Article by John Heminway August 1985
- Tatler Magazine Casts of Thousands by Laura Aitken Volume 288 2 February 1993
- Town and Country USA Epiphanies by John Heminway July 1999
