= Grosvenor Gardens =

Street in the City of Westminster, United Kingdom

Coordinates: 51.4972°N 0.1463°W

A3215

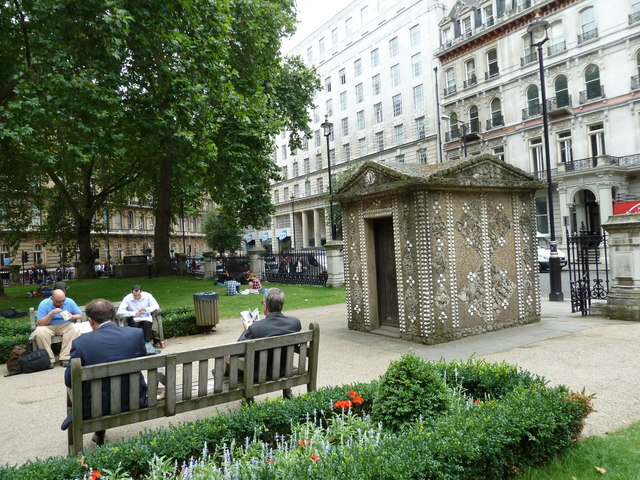
- Grosvenor Gardens south

Route information
- Length: 0.1 mi (160 m)

Major junctions
- East end: A3214 Buckingham Palace Road
- A1169; A1019; A414; M11
- East end: A302 Grosvenor Gardens

Location
- Country: United Kingdom
- Primary destinations: Victoria

Road network
- Roads in the United Kingdom; Motorways; A and B road zones
← A3214	→ A3216

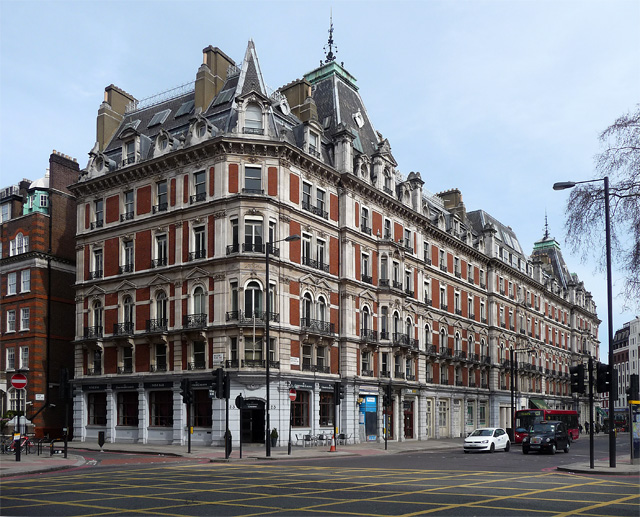
Grosvenor Gardens House

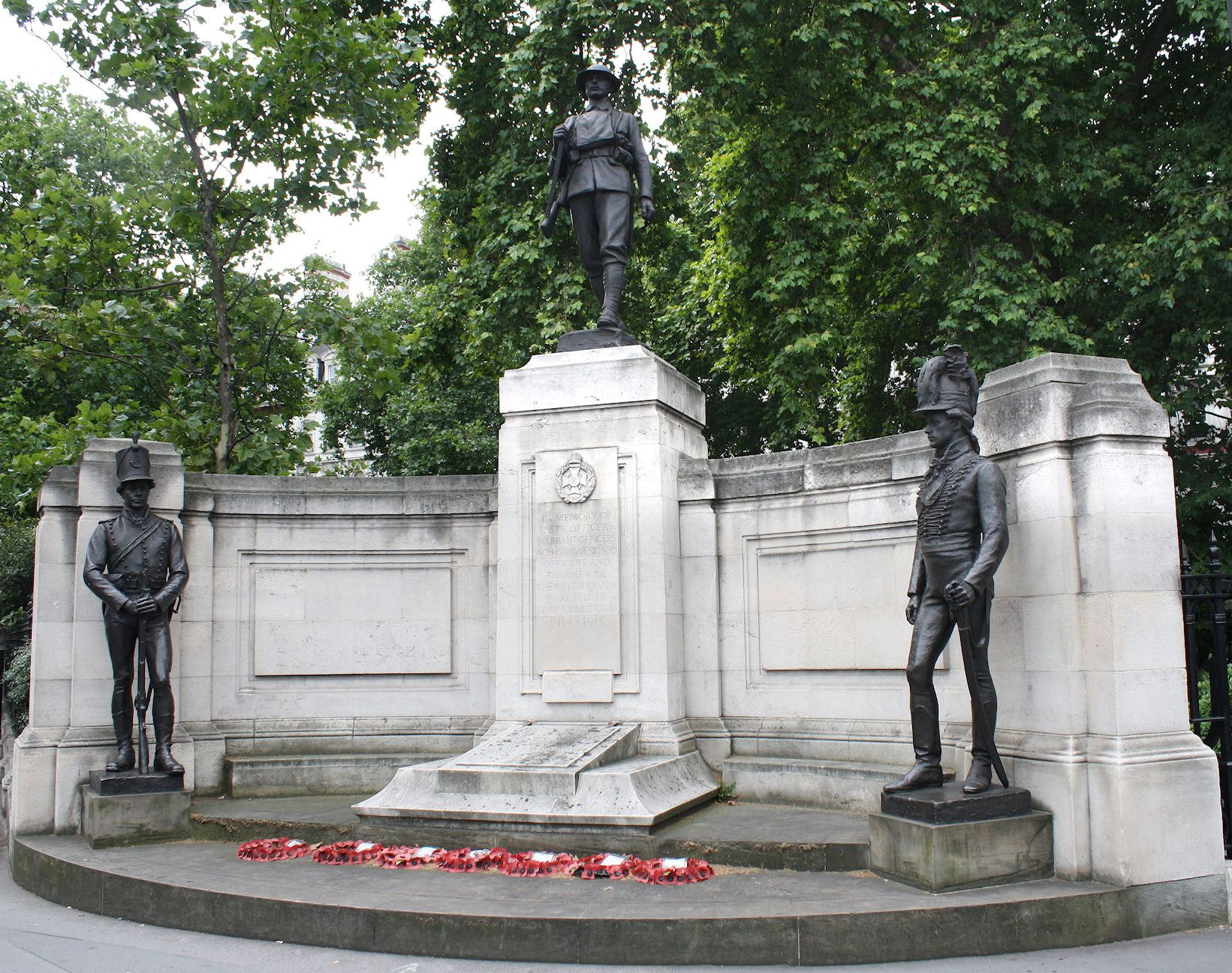
The Rifle Brigade Memorial, Grosvenor Gardens

Grosvenor Gardens is the name given to two triangular parks in Belgravia, London, faced on their western and eastern sides by streets of the same name. Both roads run roughly north to south from Hobart Place and Grosvenor Place to Buckingham Palace Road, and is entirely the A3215.

Notable buildings include the Grade II-listed Grosvenor Gardens House at Nos. 23–47, built in about 1868 by the architect Thomas Cundy III in the French Renaissance style.

The Rifle Brigade War Memorial commemorates the service of the Rifle Brigade in the First and Second World Wars. It stands at the junction of Grosvenor Gardens and Hobart Place, on land donated by the 2nd Duke of Westminster.

The shell-covered huts in the southern garden were part of a redesign of the park by Jean Moreux, architect-in-chief of the National Monuments and Palaces of France, in 1952. The fabrique style buildings are covered with shells from England and France, and are used to store gardening equipment.

The northern garden contains the sculpture Lioness and Lesser Kudu by Jonathan Kenworthy, installed in 2000.

== Notable residents ==
- William Henry Blackmore (1827–1878), killed himself in his study at Belgrave Mansions, Grosvenor Gardens
- Henry Eliot, 5th Earl of St Germans (1835–1911), lived at No. 13
- John Eliot, 6th Earl of St Germans (1890–1922), born and lived at No. 13
- Thomas Forbes (1900–1988), grew up at No. 15
- Count Hayashi Tadasu (1850–1913), First Ambassador of Japan to Great Britain. Lived at No. 4.
- Agnes Keyser opened a hospital during the First World War at No. 9, a close friend of King Edward VII, set up to nurse British officers, including the novelist Stuart Cloete. The hospital became King Edward VII's Hospital for Officers.
- Augustus Pitt Rivers (1827–1900), lived at No. 4, commemorated with a blue plaque
- F. E. Smith, 1st Earl of Birkenhead (1872–1930), lived at No. 32, commemorated with a blue plaque
