= Flanders Fields Memorial Garden =

Memorial garden in London

Coordinates: 51°30′1.66″N 0°8′8.85″W

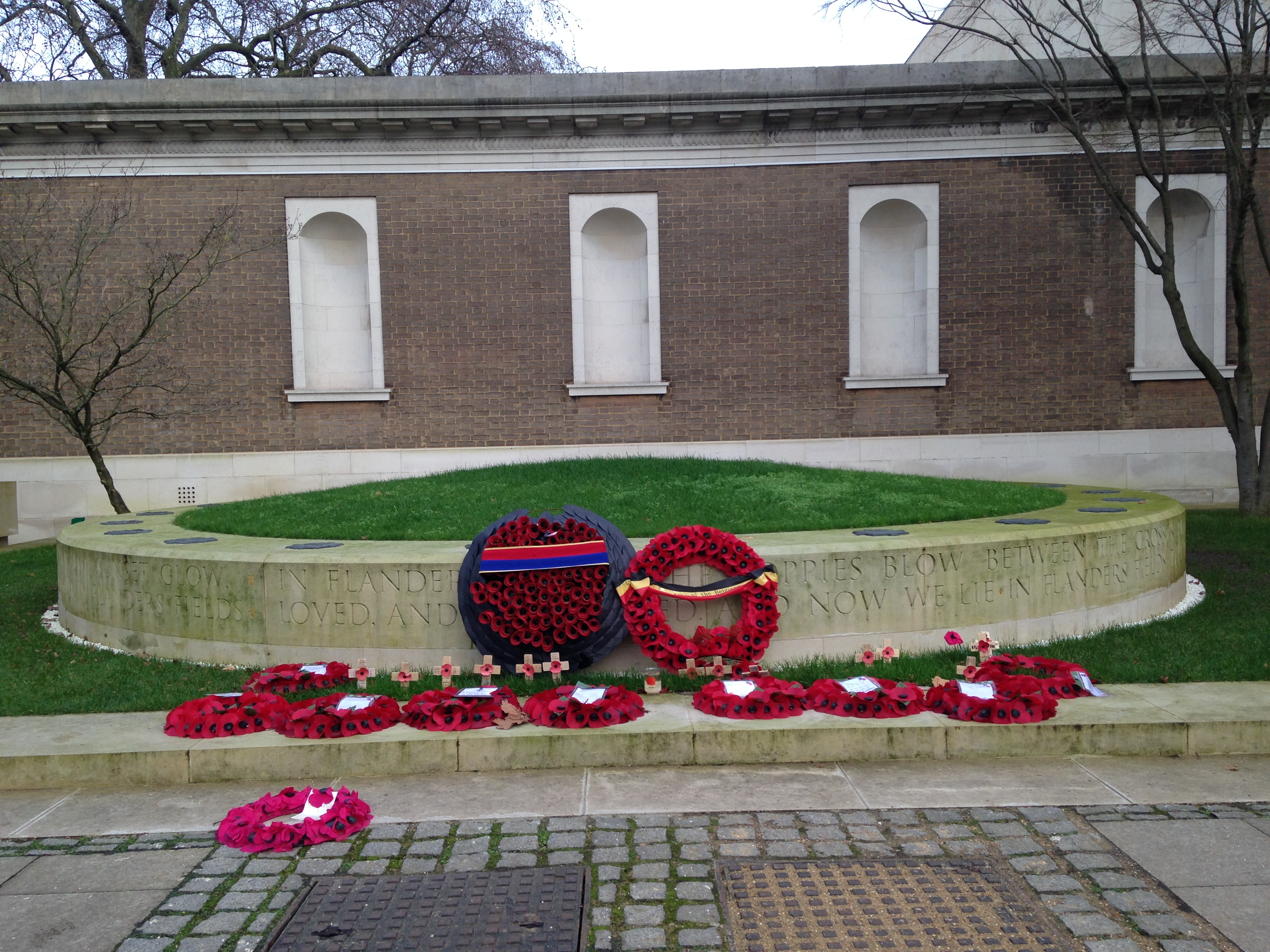
The Flanders Fields Memorial Garden at Wellington Barracks

The Flanders Fields Memorial Garden is a monument dedicated to those who served in the First World War. It is situated alongside the Guards Chapel, and next to the Statue of Harold Alexander at Wellington Barracks in Central London, England.

The garden was opened by King Philippe of the Belgians and Queen Elizabeth II on 6 November 2014. Prince Philip, Duke of Edinburgh, and Prince William, Duke of Cambridge, were also in attendance, alongside soldiers of the Household Division.

== Design ==
The garden was designed by the Belgian architect Piet Blanckaert. The garden features a 'circular grass bed' which holds soil collected from Flanders in Belgium, the site of many battles on the Western Front of World War I and trees native to Flanders. The grass bed is inscribed with words from the poem "In Flanders Fields" by John McCrae. A stone bench is also situated in the garden made from Flemish bluestone. The curator of the memorial garden, Andrew Wallis, said that the garden's design was "full of meaningful features" and it was a "wonderful fusion of Belgo-Anglo craftsmanship".

The soil held in the grass bed was collected by children from 70 war cemeteries and battlefields in Flanders during ceremonies of remembrance. Prince Philip, Duke of Edinburgh and Prince Laurent of Belgium were present for the ceremony in Ypres to hand over the sandbags of soil for the memorial on Armistice Day in 2013. The soil was carried by Belgian and British schoolchildren and soldiers from the British Household Division. Theyo loaded the soil onto a gun carriage of the King's Troop. From Belgium the soil was transported by sea by the Belgian Navy's frigate Louisa Marie (F931) and was given to the British Army on 29 November 2013 while the vessel was alongside HMS Belfast. The sandbags were then transported through London on the original gun carriage to the memorial garden.

== See also ==
- Centenary of the outbreak of World War I

== Gallery ==
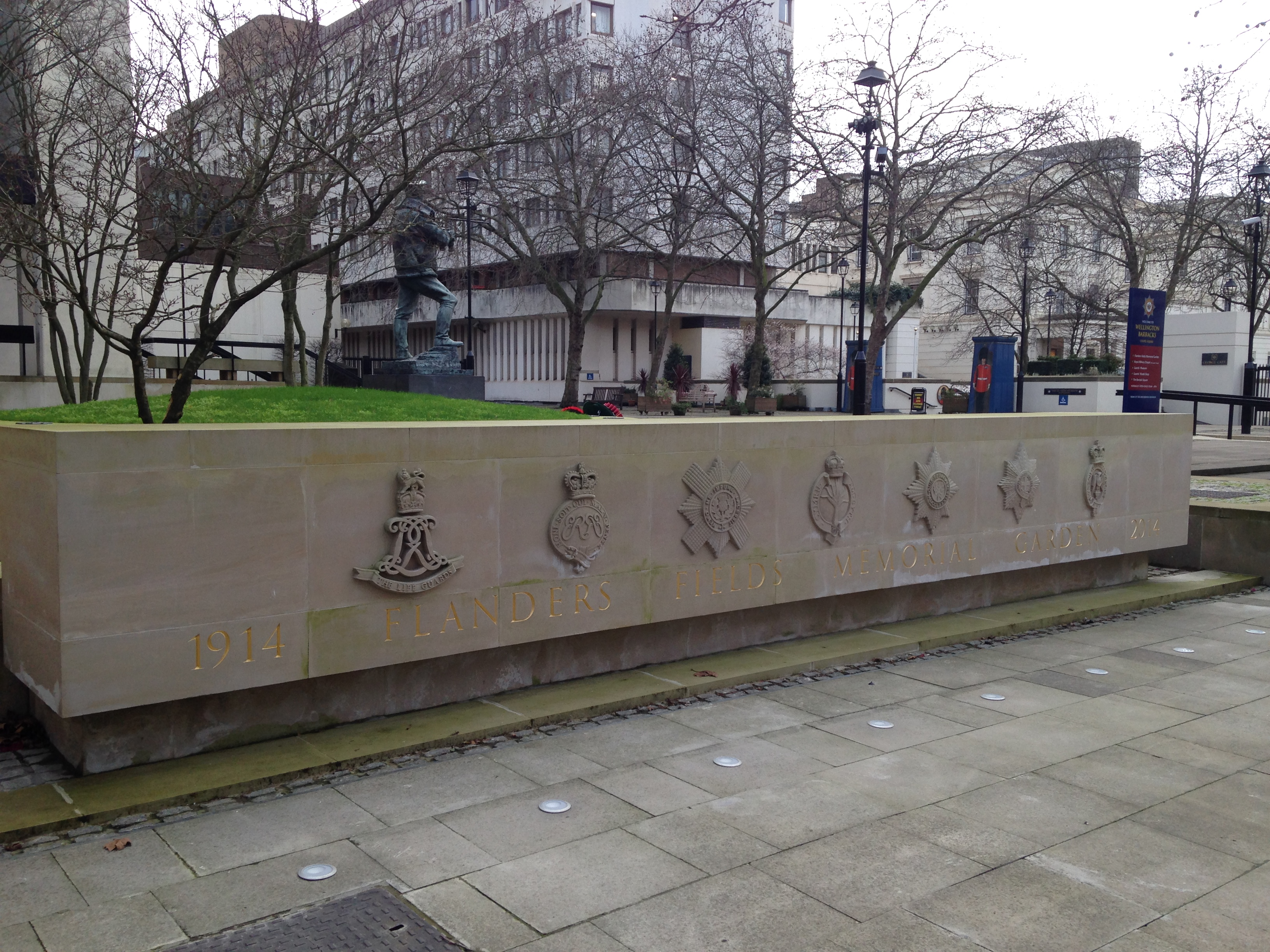

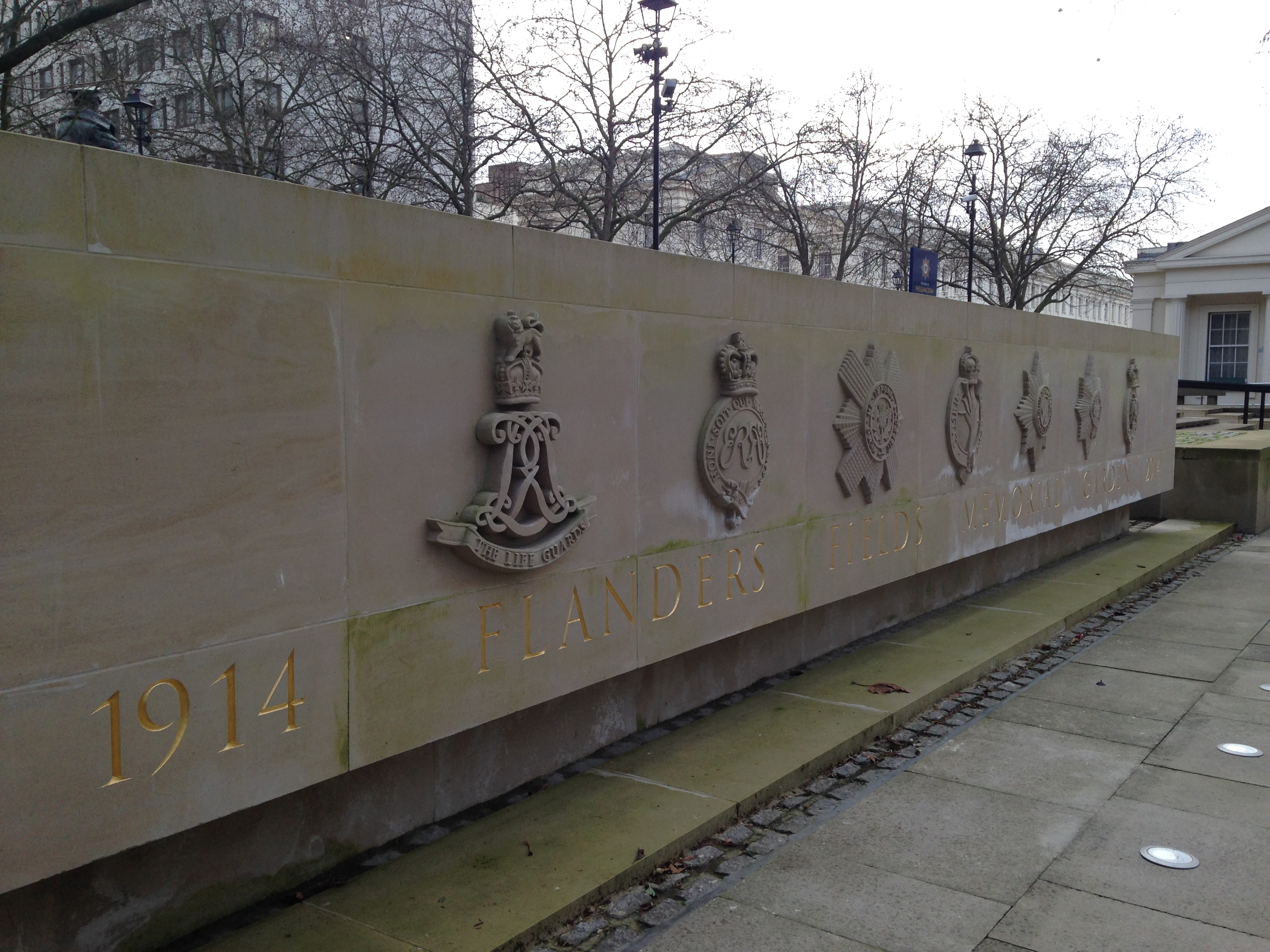

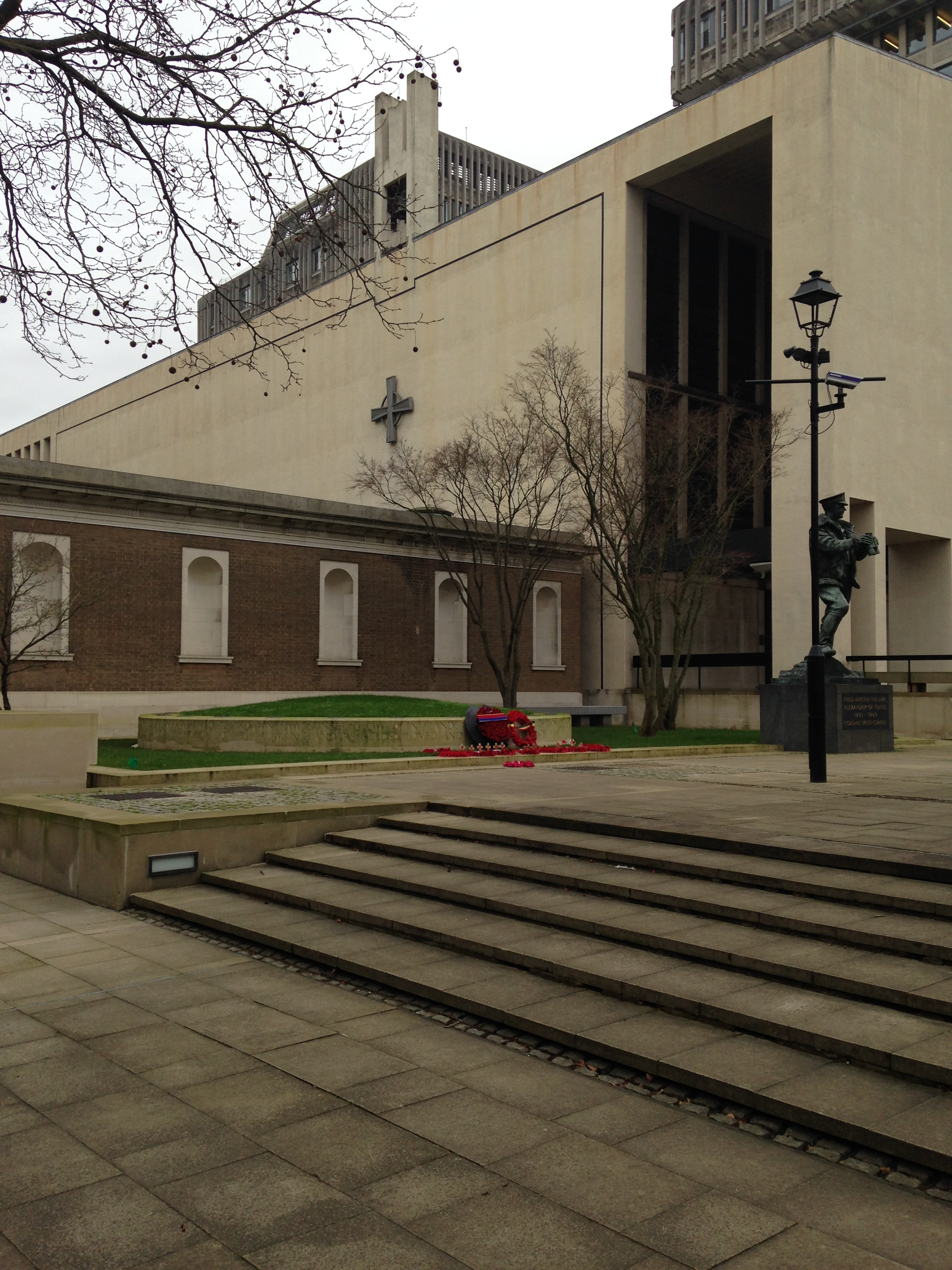

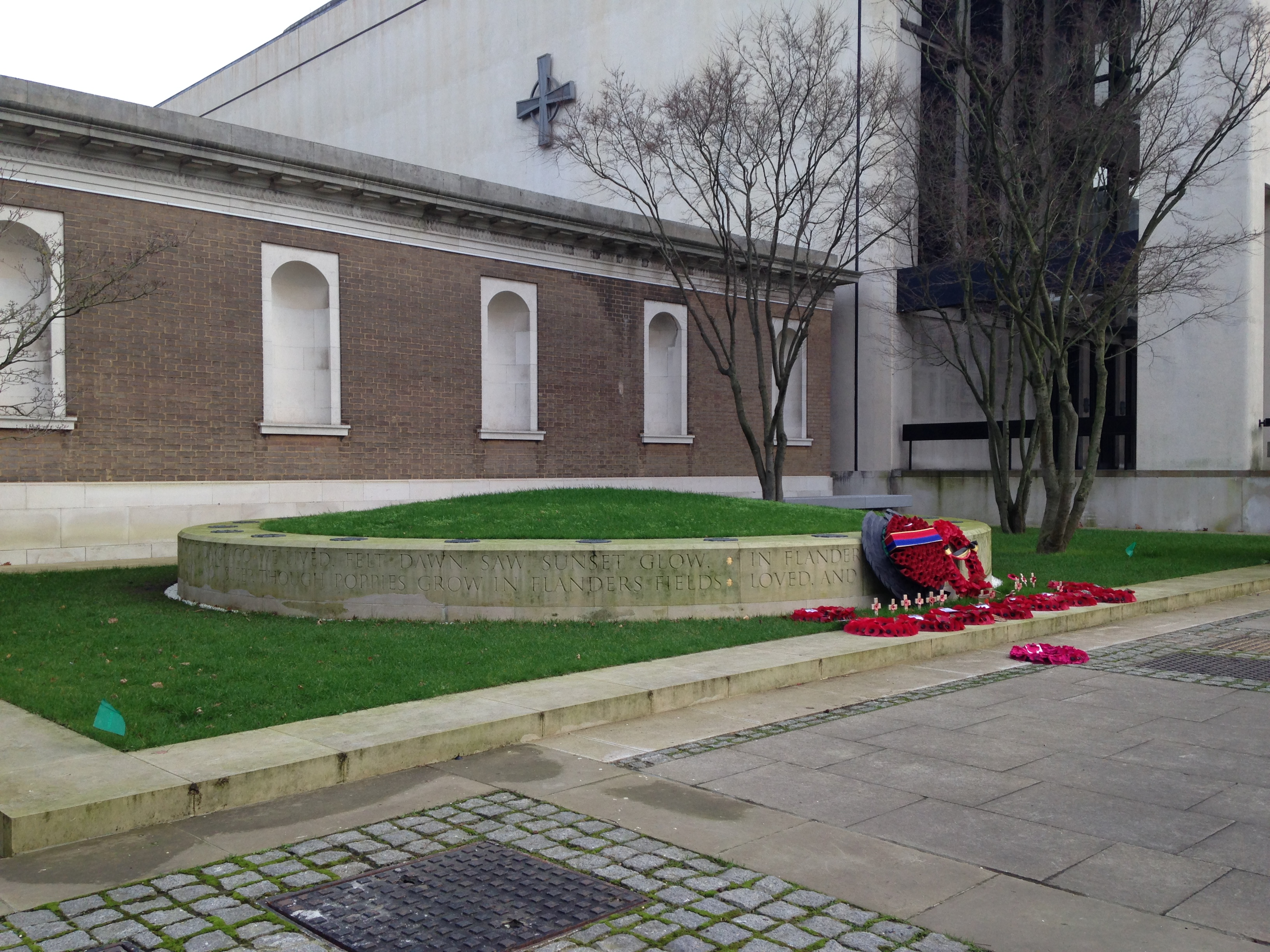

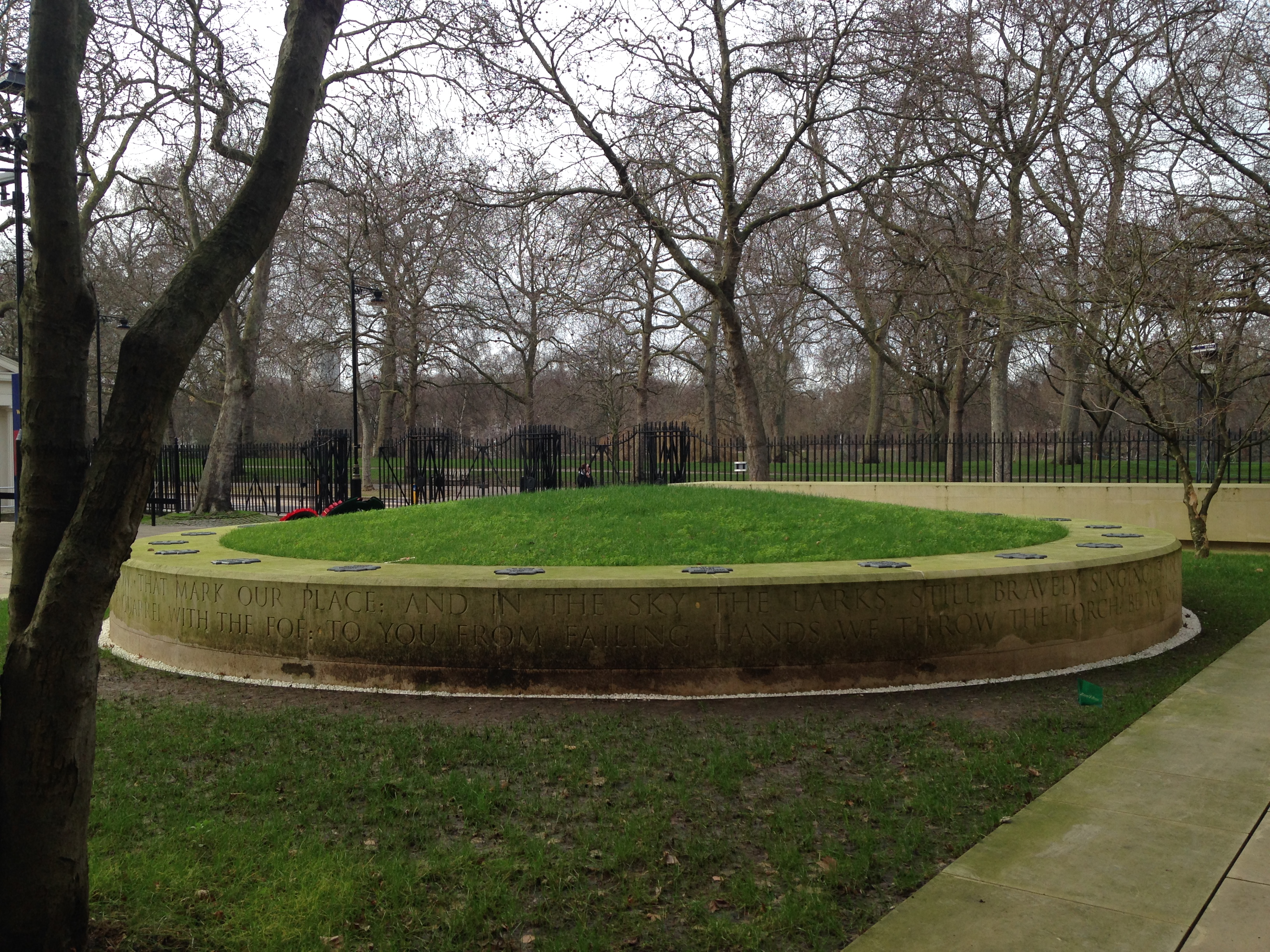

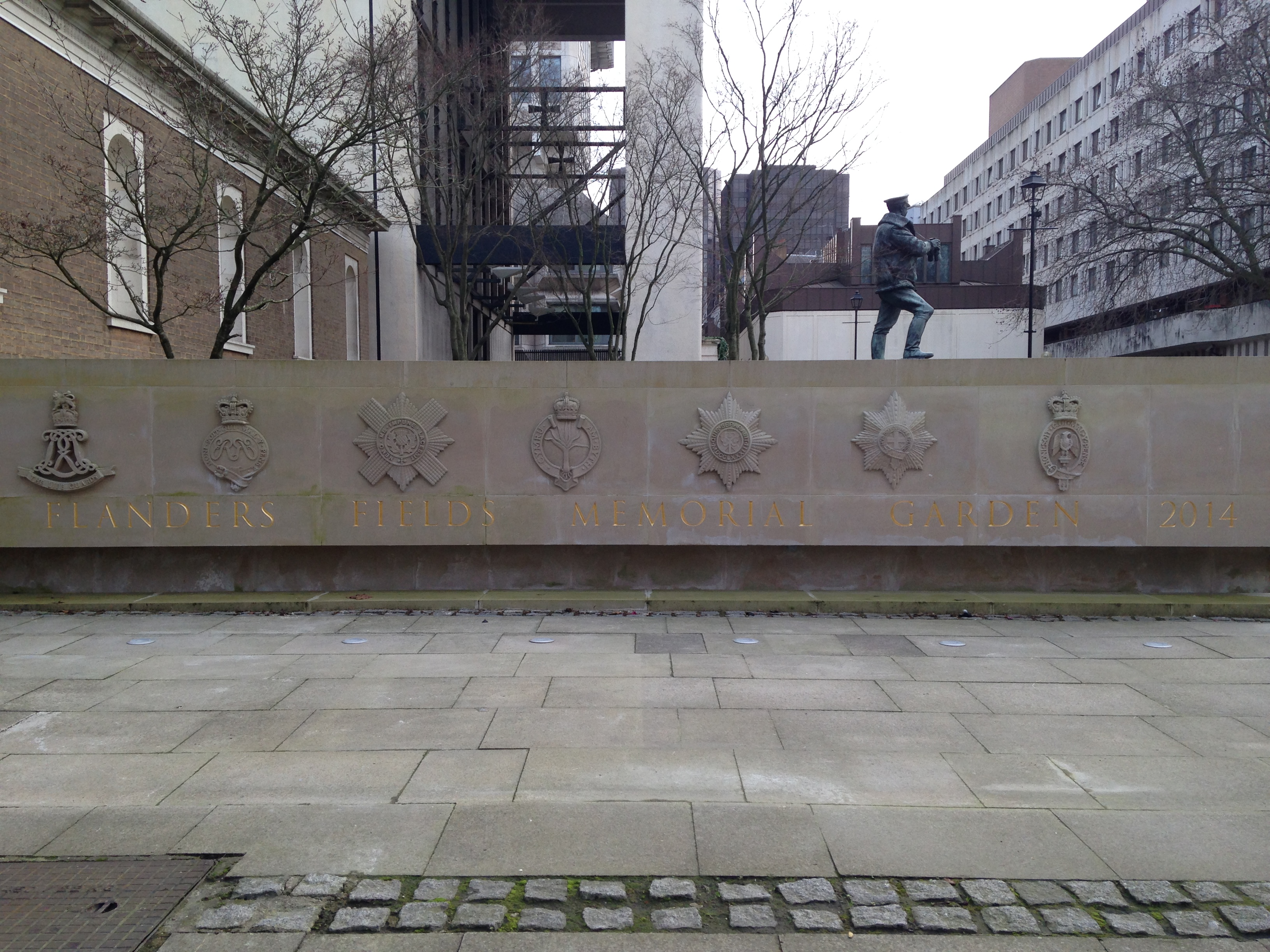

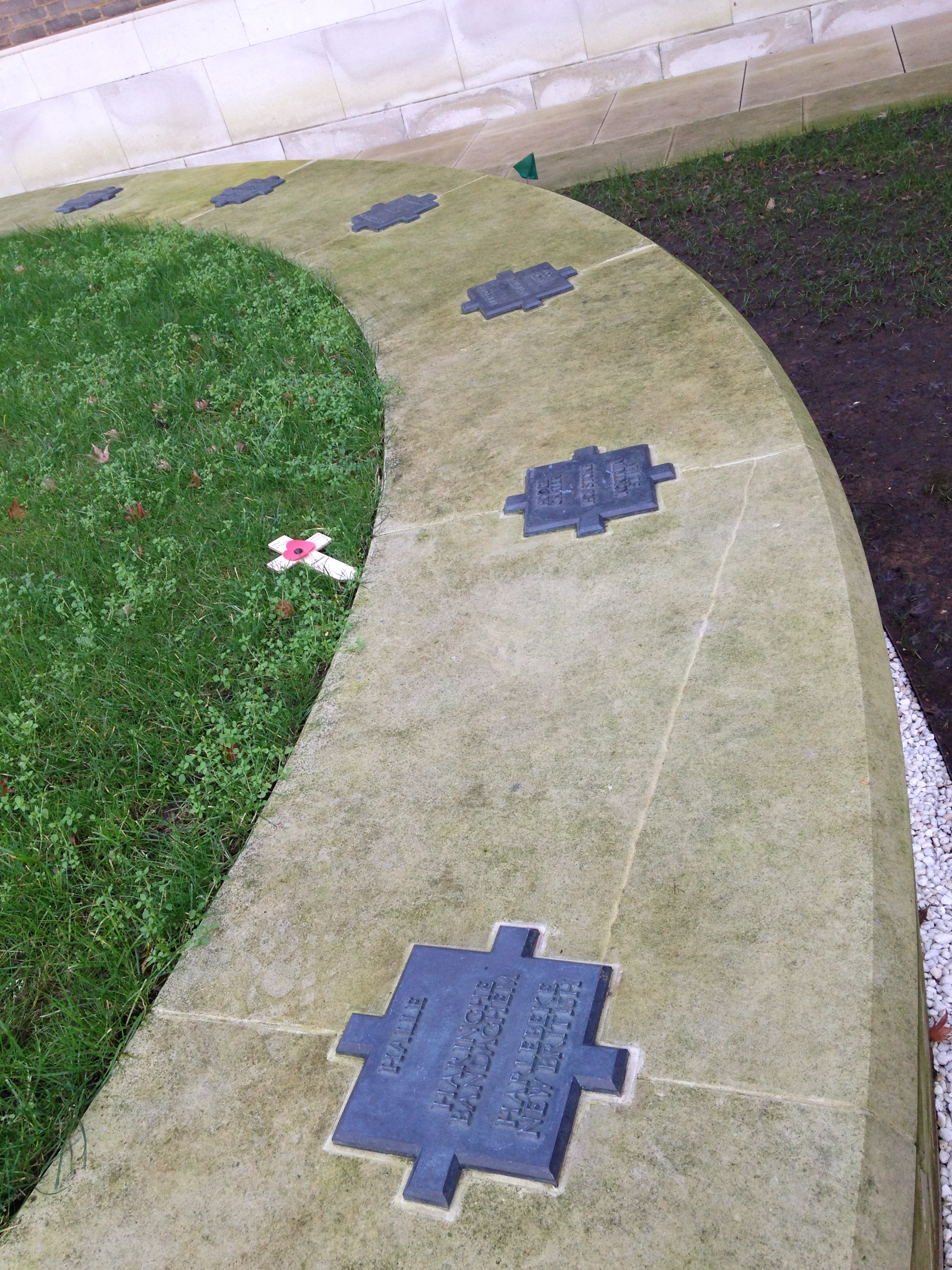

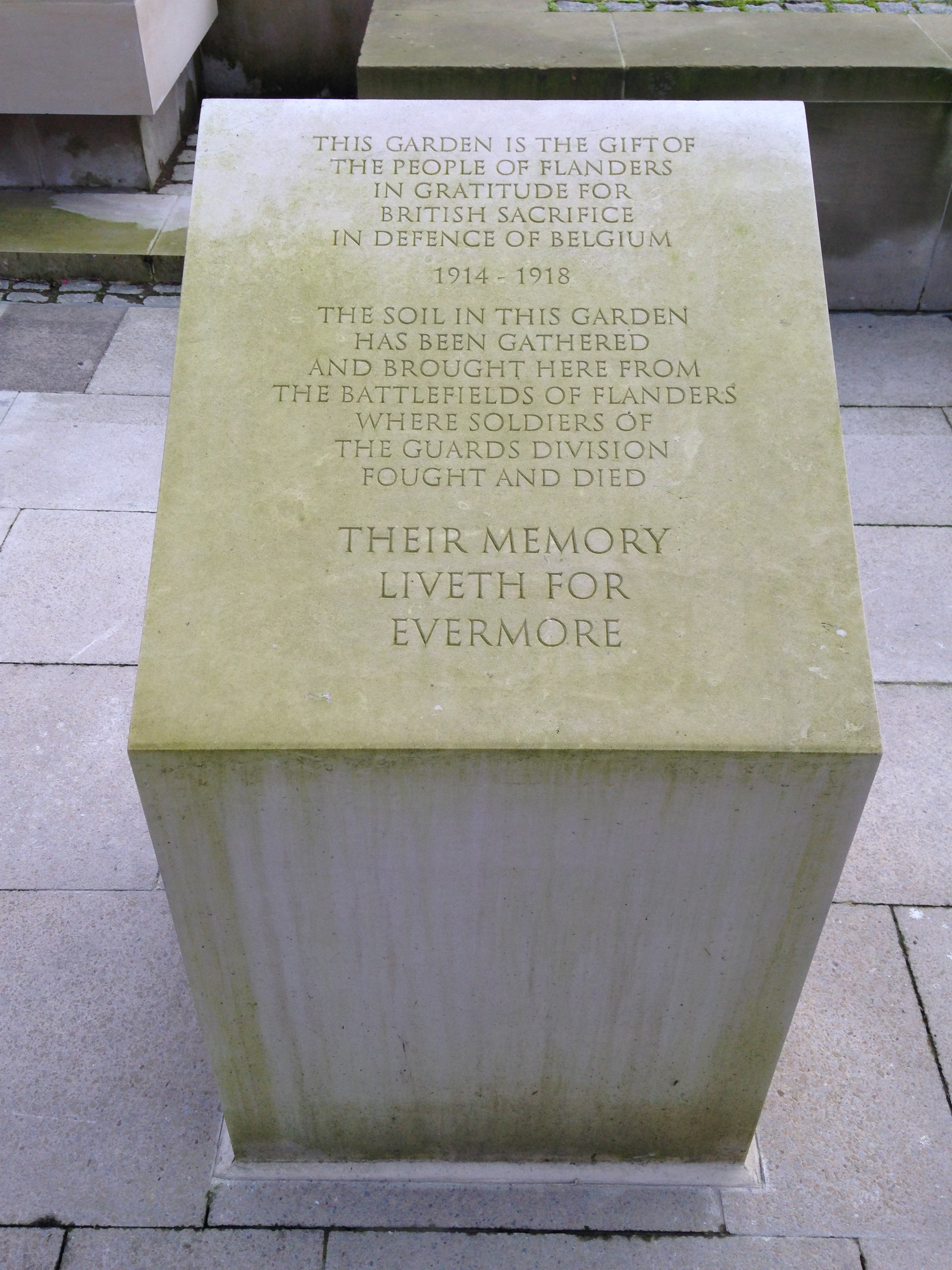
