= Rifle Brigade War Memorial =

Memorial in London, England

Coordinates: 51.4980°N 0.1471°W

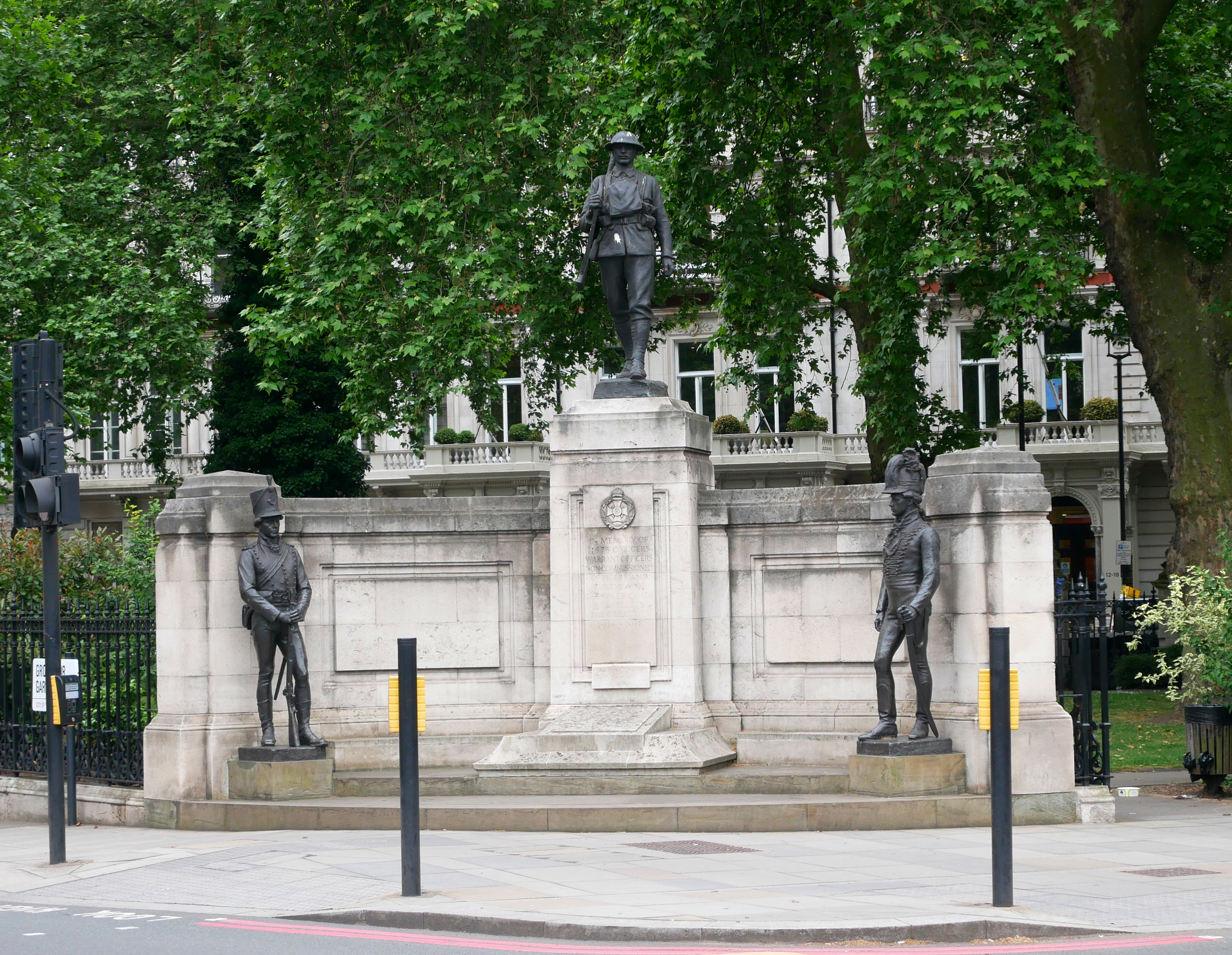
The Rifle Brigade Memorial, Grosvenor Gardens, Westminster

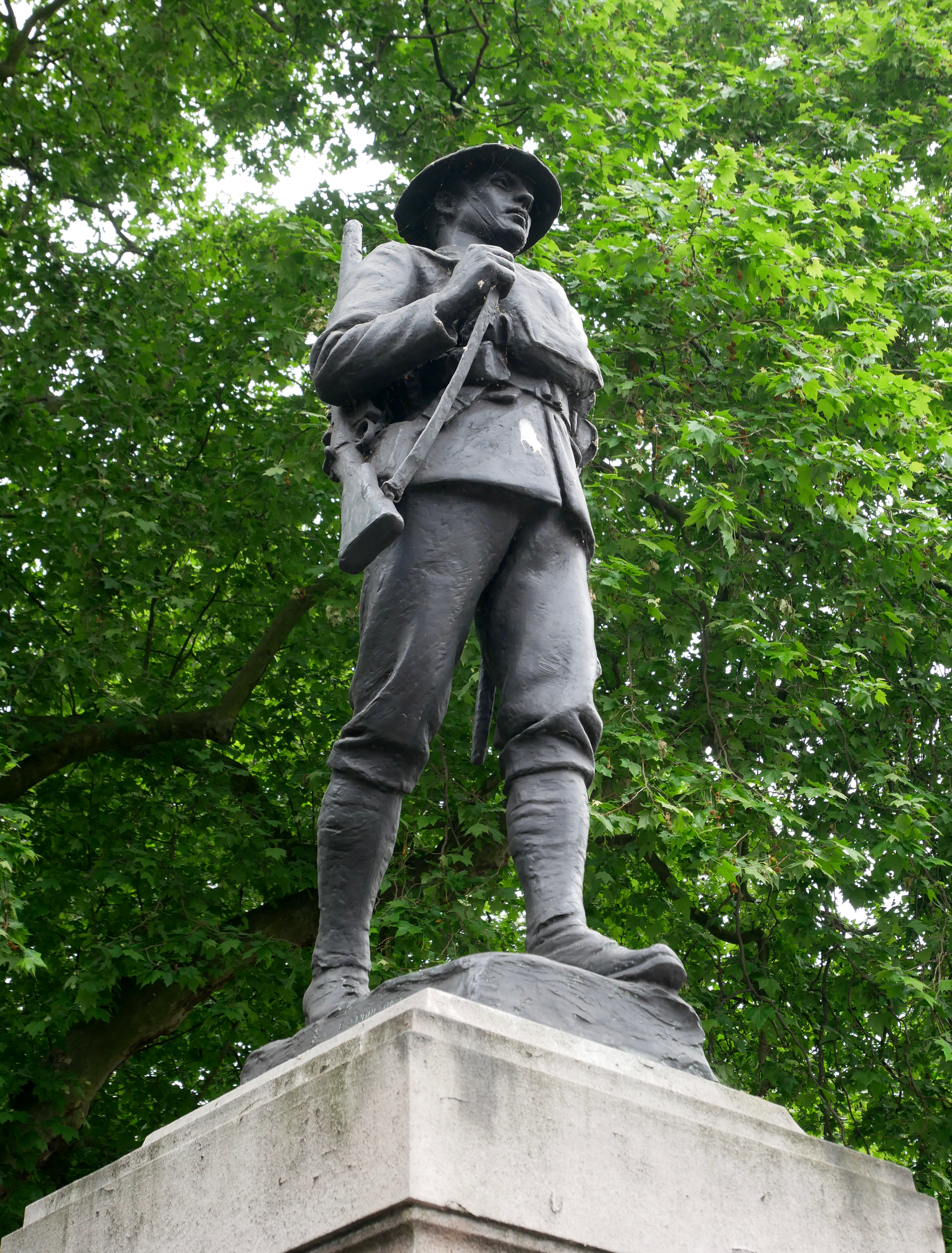
Central statue on the memorial

The Rifle Brigade War Memorial in London commemorates the service of the Rifle Brigade in the First and Second World Wars. It stands at the junction of Grosvenor Gardens and Hobart Place near Victoria Station in the City of Westminster, on land donated by the 2nd Duke of Westminster.

The design of the memorial was inspired by Colonel Willoughby Verner. Construction was funded by the Rifleman's Aid Society.

The memorial has a curved screen and central pylon of Portland stone, with three bronze statues by the Scottish artist John Tweed: on the pylon, a helmeted rifleman in First World War uniform marching with slung rifle (modelled on Rifleman Ephraim Alfred Dudley); and at ground level, in front of the screen to the left, a rifleman in 1806 pattern uniform with a Baker rifle, and, to the right, an officer with sword from 1800, when the Experimental Corps of Riflemen was formed.

An inscription on the memorial commemorates the 11,575 men from the Rifle Brigade who fell in the First World War; a later inscription mentions the 1,329 men who fell in the Second World War. All are listed on a Roll of Honour held at Winchester Cathedral.

The memorial was unveiled on 25 July 1925 by the Colonel-in-Chief of The Rifle Brigade, Field Marshal Prince Arthur, Duke of Connaught, and dedicated by the Chaplain-General to the Forces, Reverend Alfred Jarvis. The unveiling ceremony was accompanied by an honour guard from the 2nd Battalion, and another of veteran riflemen.

In 1970 the memorial was listed at Grade II; it was upgraded to Grade II* in 2016.

== See also ==
- Grade II* listed war memorials in England
