= Guards' Chapel, Wellington Barracks =

Coordinates: 51.5003°N 0.1356°W

The Guards' Chapel
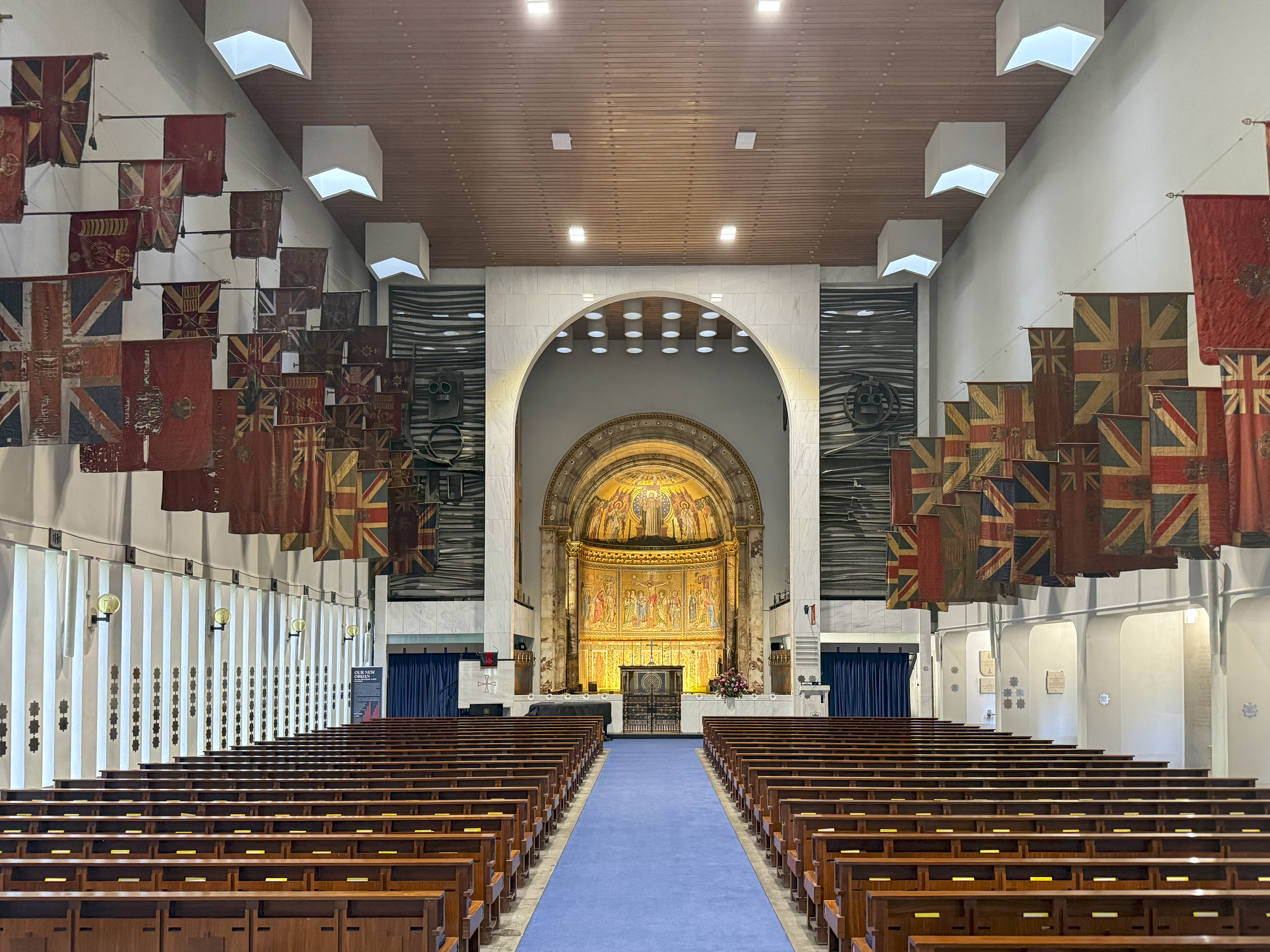
- Guards' Chapel interior in 2026
- Interactive map of the The Guards' Chapel area
- Alternative names: The Royal Military Chapel

General information
- Type: Chapel
- Architectural style: Modernist
- Location: Westminster, London, United Kingdom
- Completed: 1963

Listed Building – Grade II*
- Designated: 9 January 1970; Amended 26 April 2012
- Part of: Royal Military chapel and cloister, south of Birdcage Walk, Wellington Barracks
- Reference no.: 1066441

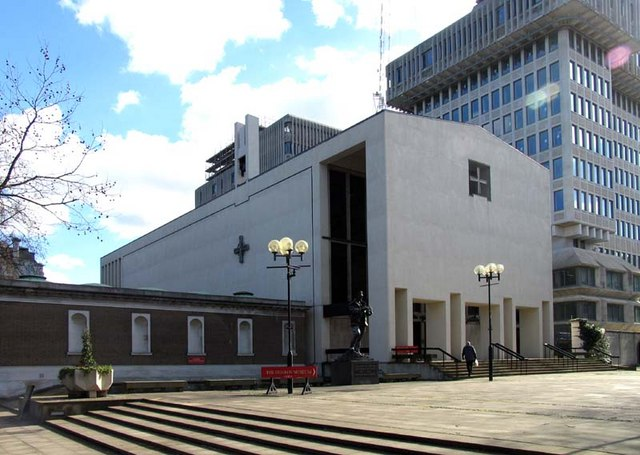
Guards' Chapel, Wellington Barracks

The Royal Military Chapel, commonly known as the Guards' Chapel, is a British Army place of worship that serves as the religious home of the Household Division at the Wellington Barracks in Westminster, Greater London. Completed in 1838 in the style of a Greek temple and re-designed during the 1870s, the first chapel on the site was damaged by German bombing during the Blitz in 1940 and 1941.

On Sunday, 18 June 1944, the chapel was hit again, this time by a V-1 flying bomb, during the morning service. The explosion of the bomb collapsed the concrete roof onto the congregation, which left 121 people killed and 141 injured (both military and civilian).

Using the memorials from the old chapel as foundations, a new chapel was built in a Modernist style in 1963. In 1970 the building was made a Grade II* listed building.

The Order of the Garter banner of Field marshal Harold Alexander, 1st Earl Alexander of Tunis was transferred from St George's Chapel, Windsor Castle to the Guards' Chapel following his death in 1969. A statue of him stands nearby.

== Memorial garden ==
The Flanders Fields Memorial Garden, dedicated to the memory of Guardsmen lost in the First World War, was opened by Queen Elizabeth II in 2014 and occupies land next to the chapel.

== Music ==
In the 1970s an organ was installed by the firm of Hill, Norman and Beard using material from an instrument at Glyndebourne as well as new pipework. In addition to leading congregational singing, the organ accompanies the Chapel’s professional choir and works alongside military bands/ensembles. With the passing of time, it was decided that the organ was struggling to meet the demands placed on it, and in the 21st century the chapel commissioned a new organ from Harrison and Harrison.

On the last Tuesday of each month, except in August, the chapel hosts a free 45-minute lunchtime concert featuring a wide variety of music.
