= Lioness and Lesser Kudu =

Sculpture in London

Coordinates: 51.497771°N 0.147038°W

- Artist: Jonathan Kenworthy
- Completion date: 2000
- Location: Grosvenor Gardens, London

Lioness and Lesser Kudu is a sculpture by Jonathan Kenworthy in Grosvenor Gardens in London.

== History and description ==
The composition consists of two sculptures founded separately but designed to be placed together. It depicts a lioness in chase after a lesser kudu. Jonathan Kenworthy was chosen as to provide an artwork to be placed in Grosvenor Gardens following their renovation and opening to the public on 13 June 2000.

The work was commissioned by Gerald Grosvenor the 6th Duke of Westminster to be placed in the gardens, although another copy of the sculpture had already been erected in grounds of the Grosvenor Family's country seat in Eaton Hall.
