= John Tweed =

Scottish sculptor (1869–1933)

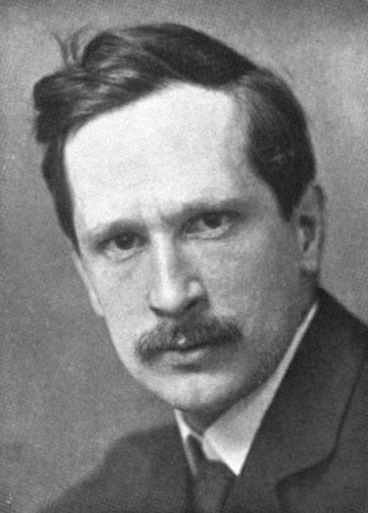
- Tweed in The Sketch, 1903
- Born: 21 January 1869; Glasgow, Scotland
- Died: 12 November 1933 (aged 64); London, England
- Burial place: Chelsea Old Church
- Education: Glasgow School of Art; Royal Academy Schools
- Occupation: Sculptor
- Spouse: Edith Clinton (m. 1895)

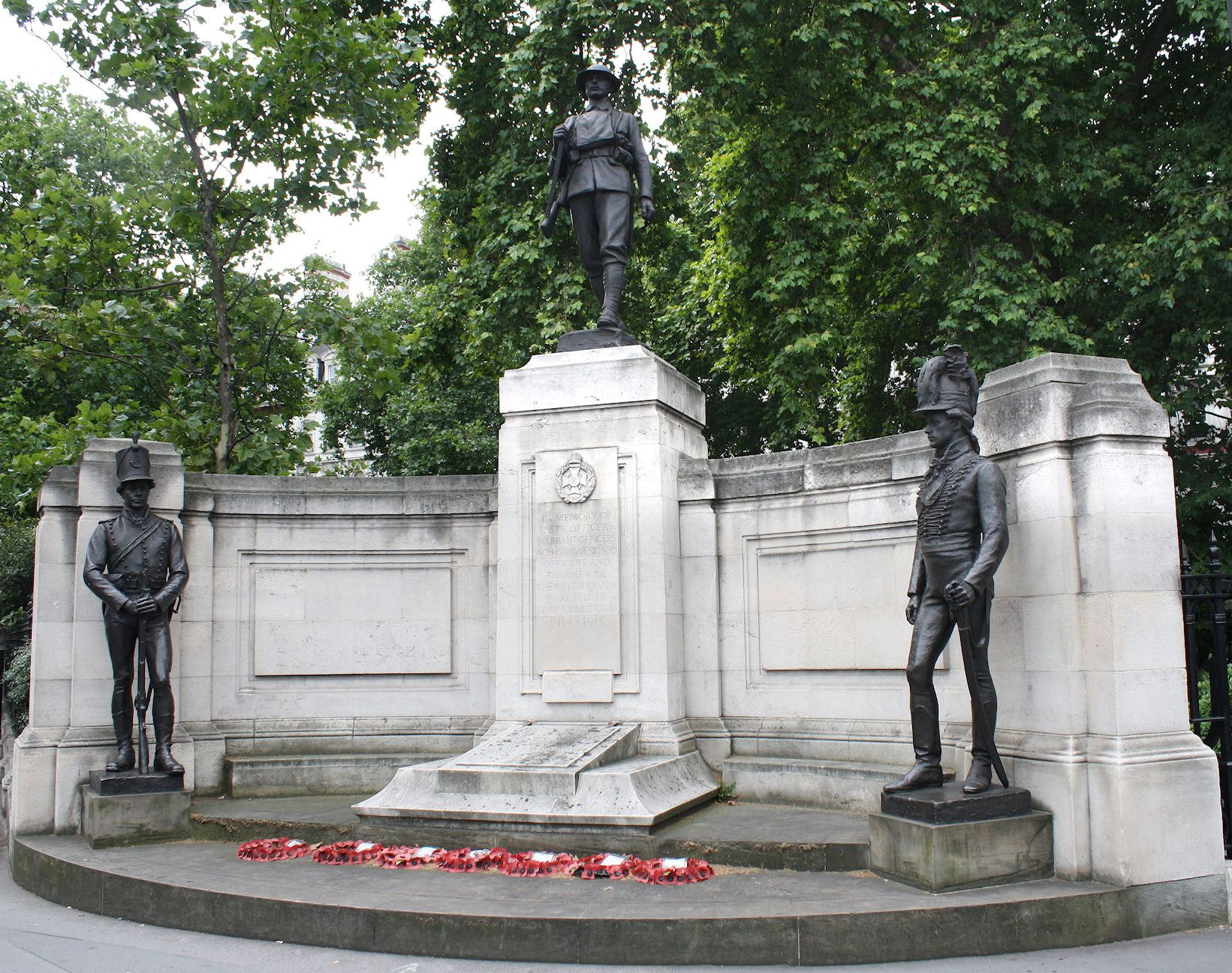
Rifle Brigade War Memorial, London

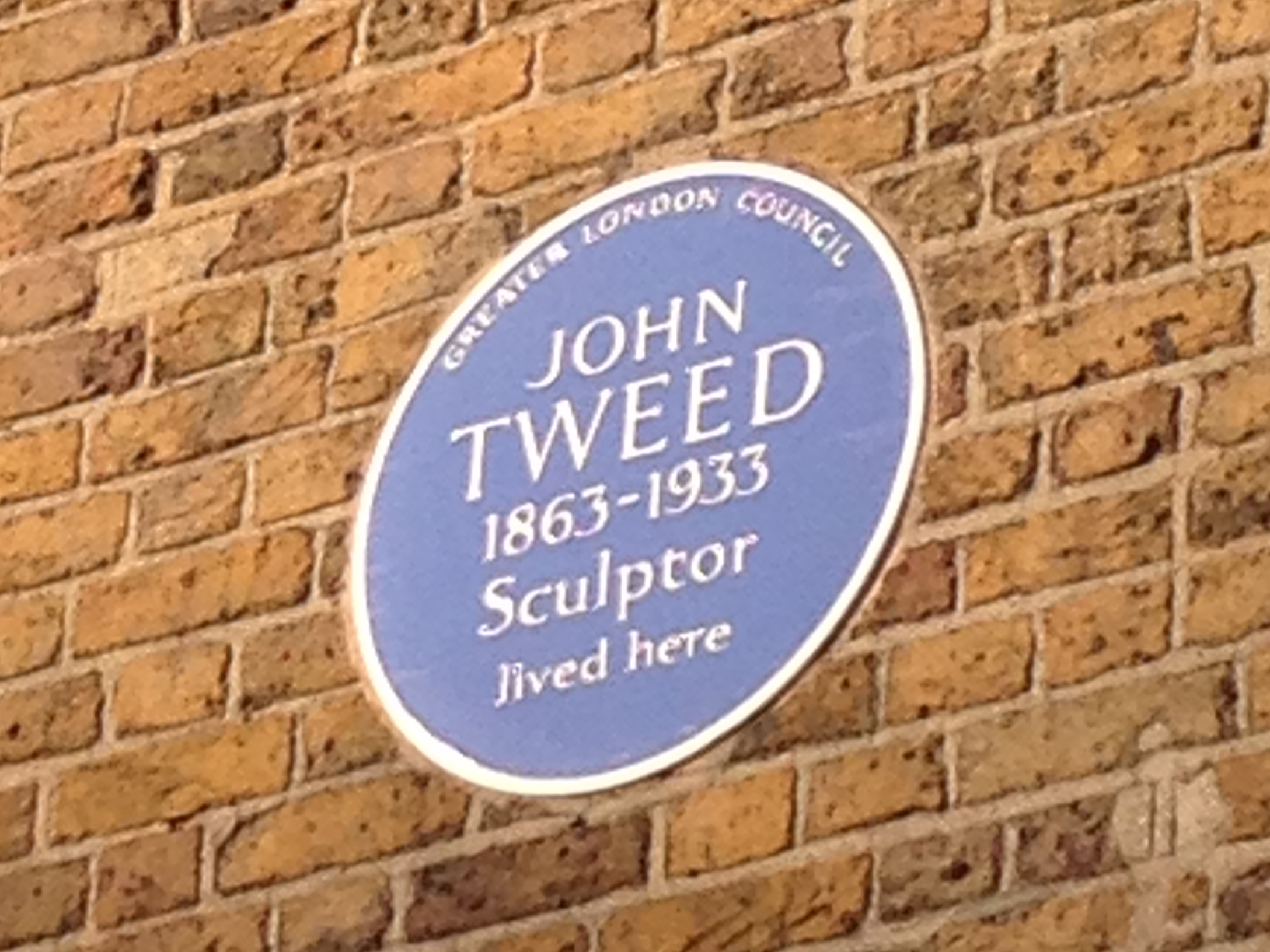
Blue plaque, 108 Cheyne Walk, Chelsea, London (his birth year incorrectly given as 1863)

John Tweed (21 January 1869 – 12 November 1933) was a Scottish sculptor.

== Early life ==
Tweed was born on 21 January 1869 at 16 Great Portland Street, Glasgow, and studied at the Glasgow School of Art. He then trained with Hamo Thornycroft in London, and attended the Royal Academy Schools at the same time. Together, they created the frieze on the Institute of Chartered Accountants' building in London. In 1893, he moved to Paris with the hope of studying with Auguste Rodin. However, this did not happen, as Rodin would only accept pupils who would spend four years under his supervision.

== Personal life ==
In 1895, he married Edith Clinton, secretary to the National Society for Women's Suffrage, the first national group in the UK to campaign for women's right to vote. In 1895, they moved into 108 Cheyne Walk, Chelsea, London, and Tweed lived there until his death on 12 November 1933, aged 64. He was buried at Chelsea Old Church.

== Legacy ==
The first major exhibition of Tweed's work since 1934 ran from March to September 2013 at the Sir John Madejski Art Gallery, Reading Museum, in Reading, England. The Victoria and Albert Museum have called him the "British Rodin".
