= Wellington Barracks =

Barracks of the British Army in the City of Westminster

- London
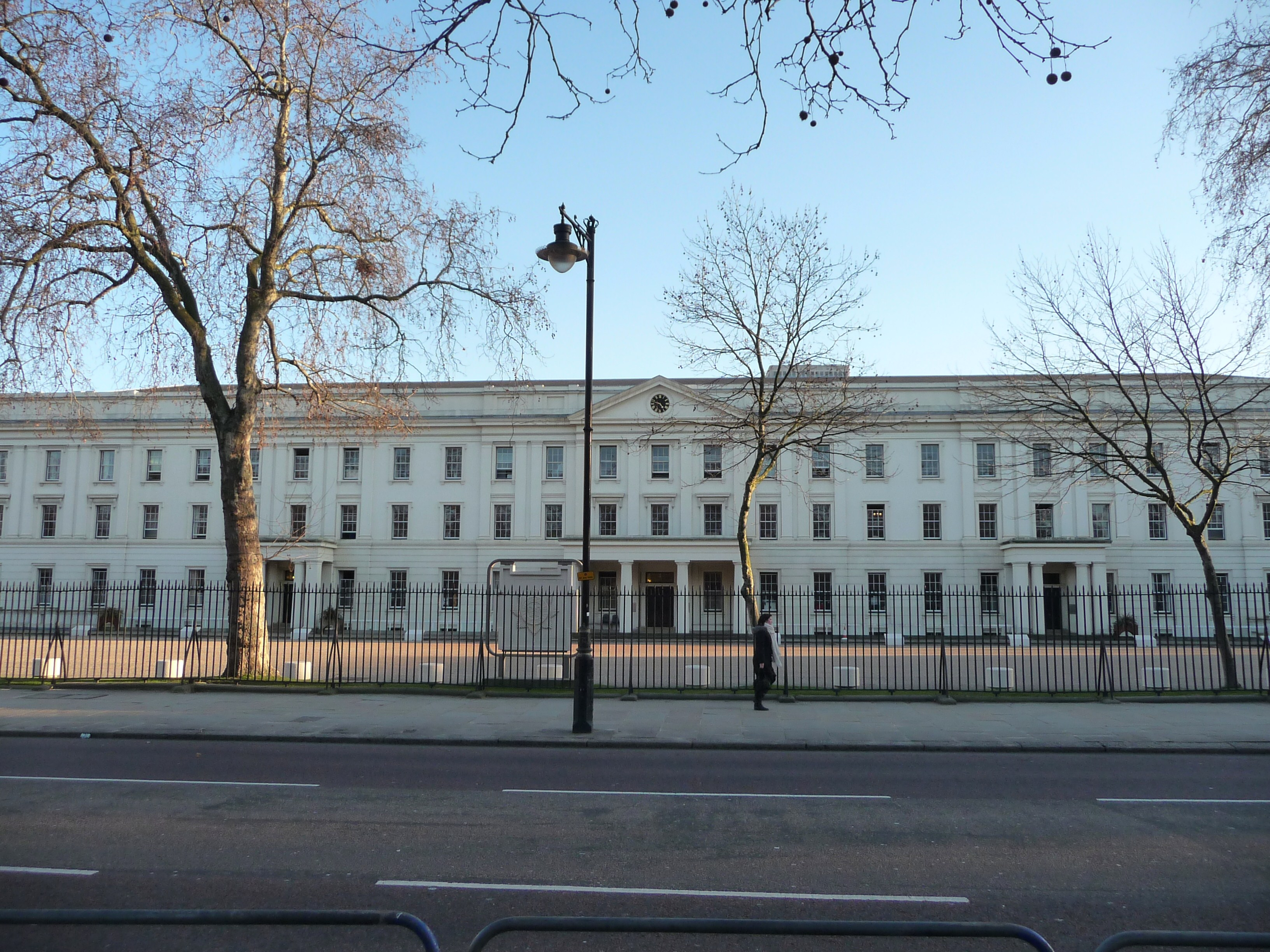
- Wellington Barracks

Site information
- Type: Barracks
- Owner: Ministry of Defence
- Operator: British Army

Location
- Location within London
- Coordinates: 51°29′59″N 0°8′16″W

Site history
- Built: 1833
- Built for: War Office
- In use: 1833–present

Garrison information
- Occupants: Grenadier Guards; Coldstream Guards; Scots Guards; Irish Guards
- Designations: Grade II listed building

Wellington Barracks is a military barracks in the City of Westminster for the Foot Guards units on public duties in that area. The building is located about 300 yards (270 m) from Buckingham Palace, allowing the Guards to reach the palace quickly in an emergency, and lies between Birdcage Walk and Petty France. Five companies are based at the barracks, as well as the Foot Guards bands and regimental headquarters.

== History ==
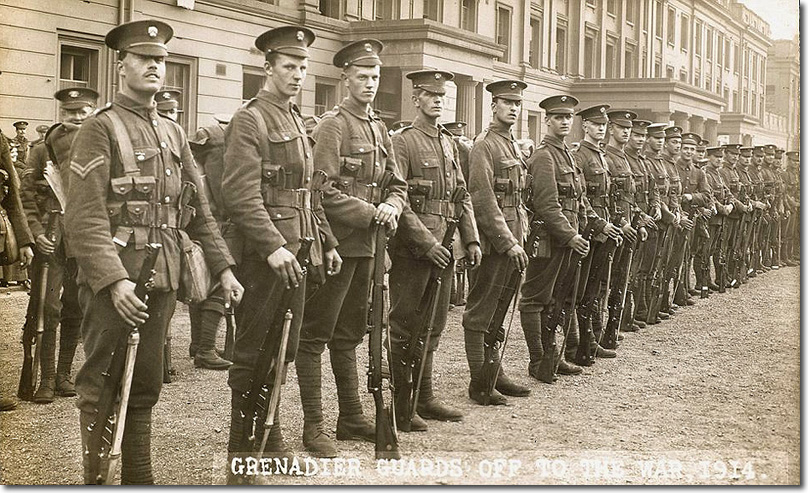
This photo taken by Christina Broom at Wellington Barracks shows men of the 2nd Battalion, Grenadier Guards, parading prior to embarkation for France in August 1914.

Wellington Barracks were designed by Sir Francis Smith and Philip Hardwick and opened in 1833. The Guards' Chapel was rebuilt in the 1960s after the original chapel was destroyed by a V-1 flying bomb in World War II. On 31 August 2007, Prince William and Prince Harry, the two sons of Diana, Princess of Wales, organised a memorial service in the chapel, marking the 10th anniversary of their mother's death.

In 2012 the 1st Battalion Grenadier Guards moved from Wellington Barracks to Aldershot. Its place was taken by the newly created London Central Garrison, formed of the Public Duties Incremental Companies of the Foot Guards. The Grenadier Guards, Coldstream Guards and Scots Guards each currently have a company based at the barracks. Since 2022, the Irish Guards have two companies based at the barracks.

The building is Grade II listed, along with the gates and railings.

== Amenities ==
Wellington Barracks has many amenities open to those working and living at the barracks. There is a bar for the junior ranks, which has many games available including horse racing and snooker tables. The Costcutter shop and a self-serve restaurant, a masseur and mess are located here. There is a single serving personnel room with internet access available, as well as an interactive learning facility open to all serving soldiers and their dependants. Elsewhere there is an officers' mess, sergeants' mess, and a gymnasium with squash courts. The Guards Museum houses a collection of uniforms, colours and artefacts spanning over three hundred years of history of the Foot Guards. The Flanders Fields Memorial Garden is situated in the barracks, adjacent to the Guards' Chapel.
