= King Charles Street =

Street in London, England

- King Charles Street as seen through the eastern King Charles Street Arch
- Interactive map of King Charles Street
- Coordinates: 51.502221°N 0.127659°W

King Charles Street is a street in the City of Westminster that connects Whitehall in the east with Horse Guards Road in the west. The street is flanked to the north and south by large government offices.

== History ==
King Charles Street was first opened around 1682, and named Charles Street or Charles's Street in honour of the reigning monarch King Charles II. It was originally residential in nature, with a number of houses lining the street. Around 1773, Ignatius Sancho, a British abolitionist and former slave, owned a greengrocer's shop at No. 19, which he ran and lived at with his family until his death in 1780.

In the late 19th and early 20th centuries the street's character changed dramatically, as it became the site of grand new buildings built to house government offices. To the north is the building now housing the Foreign, Commonwealth and Development Office, designed by George Gilbert Scott and built between 1861 and 1868. This was close to being demolished and replaced in the 1960s, but public opposition and a lack of funding saved the structure which was instead refurbished. To the south are Government Offices Great George Street, originally known as the New Public Offices in relation to Gilbert Scott's older offices to the north. A work of the architect John Brydon, the design was selected through a competition and drew inspiration from Inigo Jones's design for a new Whitehall Palace in the 1630s. Brydon died before the building was finished and Henry Tanner saw it to completion. During the Second World War the building's basement was used for the Cabinet War Rooms.

== Features ==
The statue of Robert Clive on the Clive Steps

The two buildings are joined at the eastern end by the King Charles Street Arch. Added by 1908, this serves as a gateway to the street from the Whitehall side. Sculpture for the archway was carried out by William Silver Frith, who provided figures for the spandrels, and Paul Raphael Montford who produced the groups and relief on the upper register. The arch also serves as a bridge between the two buildings.

At the western end are a small number of memorials. On the steps down to Horse Guards Road stands a statue of Robert Clive, a 1912 sculpture by John Tweed originally erected outside Gwydyr House as works on the steps were ongoing, and moved to its current location in 1917. Robert Clive's name is sometimes given to the steps themselves, which are known as the Clive Steps. At the base of the steps is the Bali Bombings Memorial, a memorial commemorating the victims of the 2002 bombings in Bali. Parts of the Cabinet War Rooms were opened by the Imperial War Museum to public viewing, with the entrance at the southern base of the steps.

On the wall of the Foreign, Commonwealth and Development Office is a plaque commemorating the location where Ignatius Sancho worked and lived for the latter years of his life.
