= One Great George Street =

Building in Westminster, London

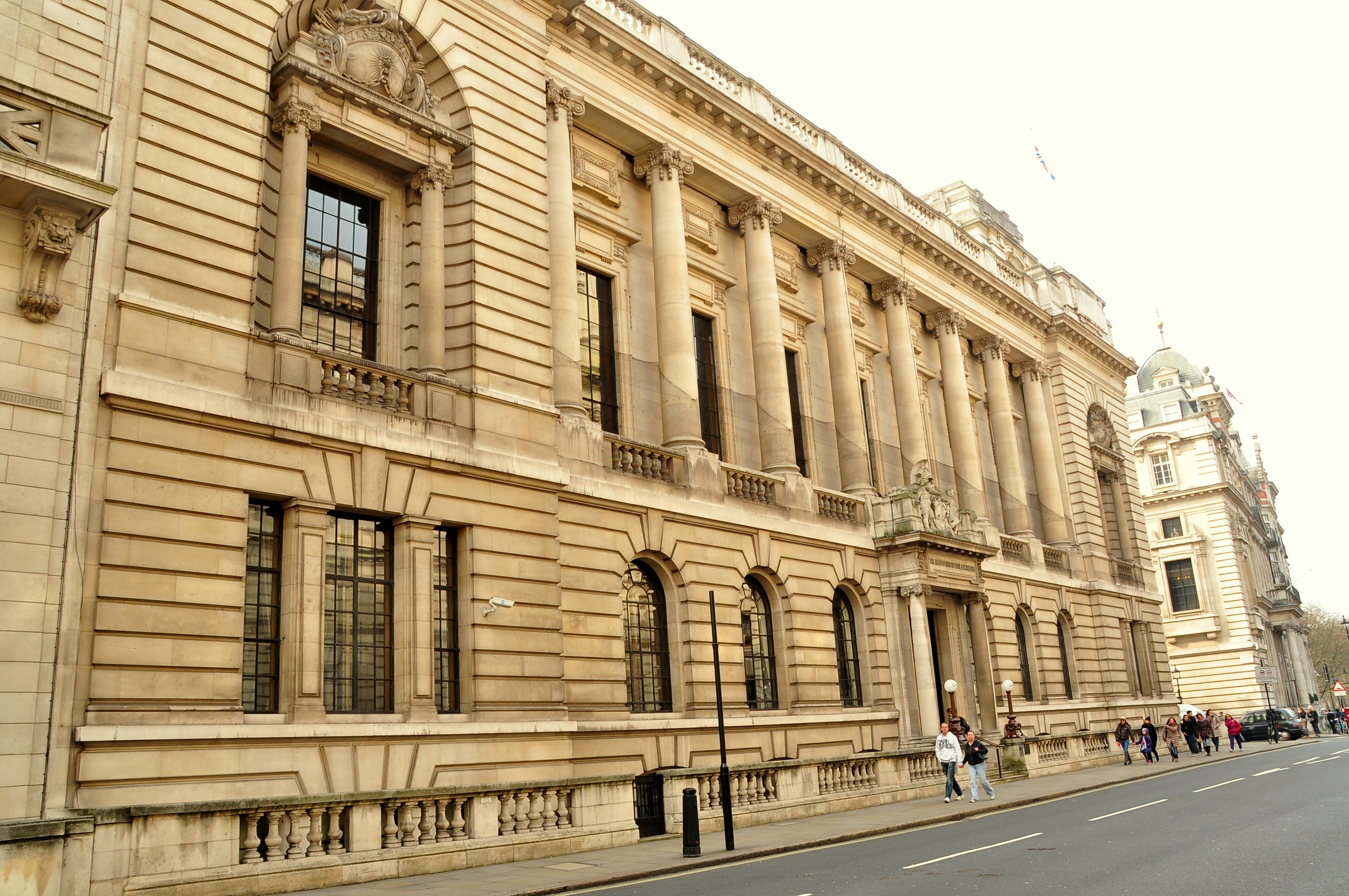

- Location within Greater London

General information
- Type: Monumental neo-classical design
- Architectural style: Modern rendering of the late Renaissance
- Location: One Great George Street, London, England
- Coordinates: 51°30′57″N 0°7′6″W
- Construction started: 1910
- Completed: 1913

Design and construction
- Architects: James Miller, RSA

Website
- onegreatgeorgestreet.com

One Great George Street (OGGS) is a four-domed grade II listed Edwardian building used as a conference and wedding venue just off Parliament Square in Westminster, England. The building is the global headquarters of the Institution of Civil Engineers (ICE); it was originally solely a venue for ICE members to meet informally and for conferences, but became available for public events in 1989. It is near the Houses of Parliament, Westminster Abbey, and St James's Park.

== Building and history ==
Great Hall Ceiling Painting at One Great George Street.

From 1839 until 1913, ICE occupied numbers 24–26 Great George Street. In the mid-1880s the government proposed re-development of the area around Great George Street to provide more office space for government departments. This meant the demolition of ICE's first location and led ICE to move its headquarters across the road to numbers 1–7.

One Great George Street was built for the ICE between 1910 and 1913 and was the result of an architectural competition won by James Miller, RSA (1860–1947). His winning design was priced at £77,126, with the other architects involved in the design competition including Brigg, Wolstenholme & Thornely, John Belcher, William Emerson, Charles Edward Barry and Thomas Collcutt. The contractor who built the building was Mowlem.

One Great George Street is an early example of steel-frame technology in Britain, with the structural frame using approximately 1,227 tons of steel supplied by the Lanarkshire Steel Company. The assembly of the steel-frame was subcontracted to Dawnay Ltd. and was built using several Scotch derrick cranes.

This elegant and historical building has been described as a "monumental neo-classical design" and a "modern rendering of the late Renaissance". The exterior, foyer and staircase are made of Portland stone and many of the rooms are ornately decorated with French walnut and oak panelling, carved plaster ceilings and elaborate crystal chandeliers. The most impressive apartment in the building is the Great Hall, which is approached via the grand staircase and its processional route to the first floor. The walls of the Great Hall can be described as a 'Graeco-Roman rhapsody', as huge marble pilasters with bronze effect Ionic capitals and metal bases interspersed with consoled panels that frame portraits from the Institution's oil paintings collection flow around the vertical surfaces. The ceiling of the Great Hall features a huge painting by Charles Sims commemorating World War 1 (the patron being Sir John Purser Griffith, ICE President in 1920). The work shows a female figure draped in what appears to be a robe or peplos holding in one hand a giant Union Flag, billowing in the wind, and in the other hand a wreath (she is identified in the ICE Catalogue of Works and Art as 'the figure of Renown, wearing a mourning veil and holding out a wreath of bays with the gesture of crowning'). Peering down at the viewer from the edge of the painting are servicemen and women dressed in uniforms reflecting the different branches of the military and above them can be seen a low-flying biplane with fixed undercarriage proudly displaying its red, white, and blue insignia. The corners of the painting show civil engineering scenes in the form of viaducts, steel structures, cranes etc.

Between 1987 and 1991 the venue was modernised, with a theatre and another three rooms added to the lower ground floor, and a suite of smaller meeting rooms and a business centre in the basement level.

There are 19 rooms of varying size and style available for hire. Each room has been named after notable civil engineers, and the venue has paintings of them.

== Paintings ==
The ICE's art collections include works from William Lionel Wyllie (1851–1931), John Lucas (1807–1874) and John Everett Millais (1829–1896) and is the world's largest collection of portraits of civil engineers. The ceiling of the Great Hall has a painting that commemorates the work of civil engineers in World War I. The Telford Theatre also holds a twin fusee Grand Sonnerie Bracket Clock made by the famous clockmaker Thomas Tompion, who is buried in Westminster Abbey.

The ICE commissioned a number of paintings by Glasgow-based artist Jonathan Meuli which have been hung in both the café bar and the lower ground foyer. The project, entitled "Painting a New London" was supported by the Research and Development Enabling Fund. The output of the project is a series of large paintings rather than a report. The paintings' subjects the major construction and infrastructure projects for the 2012 London Olympics. Meuli also has a blog with sketches and photographs from the project.

== Notable events ==
- Signing of the charter establishing UNESCO (United Nations Educational, Scientific and Cultural Organization), 1945
- Queen Elizabeth II visited for the 150th anniversary of the first Royal Charter of the Institution of Civil Engineers in 1978 and unveiled a specially commissioned portrait of herself which hangs in the foyer.
- Group of Seven manifestos, 1990s
- Labour Party manifestos, 1990s
- Foreign and Commonwealth Office event where One Great George Street was used to house delegation offices for 7 countries including their heads of Government for the ASEM II Conference as part of the UK's Presidency of the European Union, May 1998
- A dinner was held in the Great Hall in 2004 to celebrate the Duke of Edinburgh's 50th year as an Honorary Fellow; he was the Senior Honorary Fellow of the ICE.
- David Frost hosted the tenth anniversary of his Sunday morning interview programme, Breakfast with Frost, with many prominent politicians and celebrities present, including Ronnie Corbett, in 2004
- Butler Review press conference, July 2004
- MP's 50th Birthday Party with Margaret Thatcher, John Major, William Hague, other politicians and ex-politicians, and Rory Bremner, March 2007
- VJ Day anniversary celebration: the Prince of Wales and the Duchess of Cornwall received veterans from the Second World War in the Far East. The Prime Minister was also present, August 2010
- The Prince of Wales Halcrow/ICE keynote address, February 2012
- Chosen by the Mayor of London, Boris Johnson, to house the Media Centre for the London 2012 Olympic and Paralympic Games on 18 August 2010.

=== Films ===
- In the Loop, 2009
- Bridget Jones: The Edge of Reason, 2004
- Gandhi, 1982
- Bean, 1997
- Cambridge Spies, late 1990s
- Starter for 10, 2006
- Hattrick, 2007
- Fast & Furious 6, One Great George Street catered for the cast and crew during filming, September 2012

=== Fashion ===
- Alice Temperley fashion show as part of London Fashion week with Autumn/Winter 2012/13 collection
- Antonio Berardi as part of London Fashion week with Spring/summer collection 2010

=== Television series ===
- Spooks (numerous episodes)
- Foyle's War
- In Deep
- Between The Lines
- Kavanagh QC
- Silent Witness
- The Diplomat

== Awards ==
The venue has won the following awards:

Cateys Finalist 2011	Meeting Industry Awards 2011	Conference Awards 2011	Cateys Finalist 2012	Meeting Industry Awards 2012	Conference Awards 2012

== See also ==
- Houses of Parliament
- London Eye
- Westminster Abbey
- Government Offices Great George Street

== Building plans ==
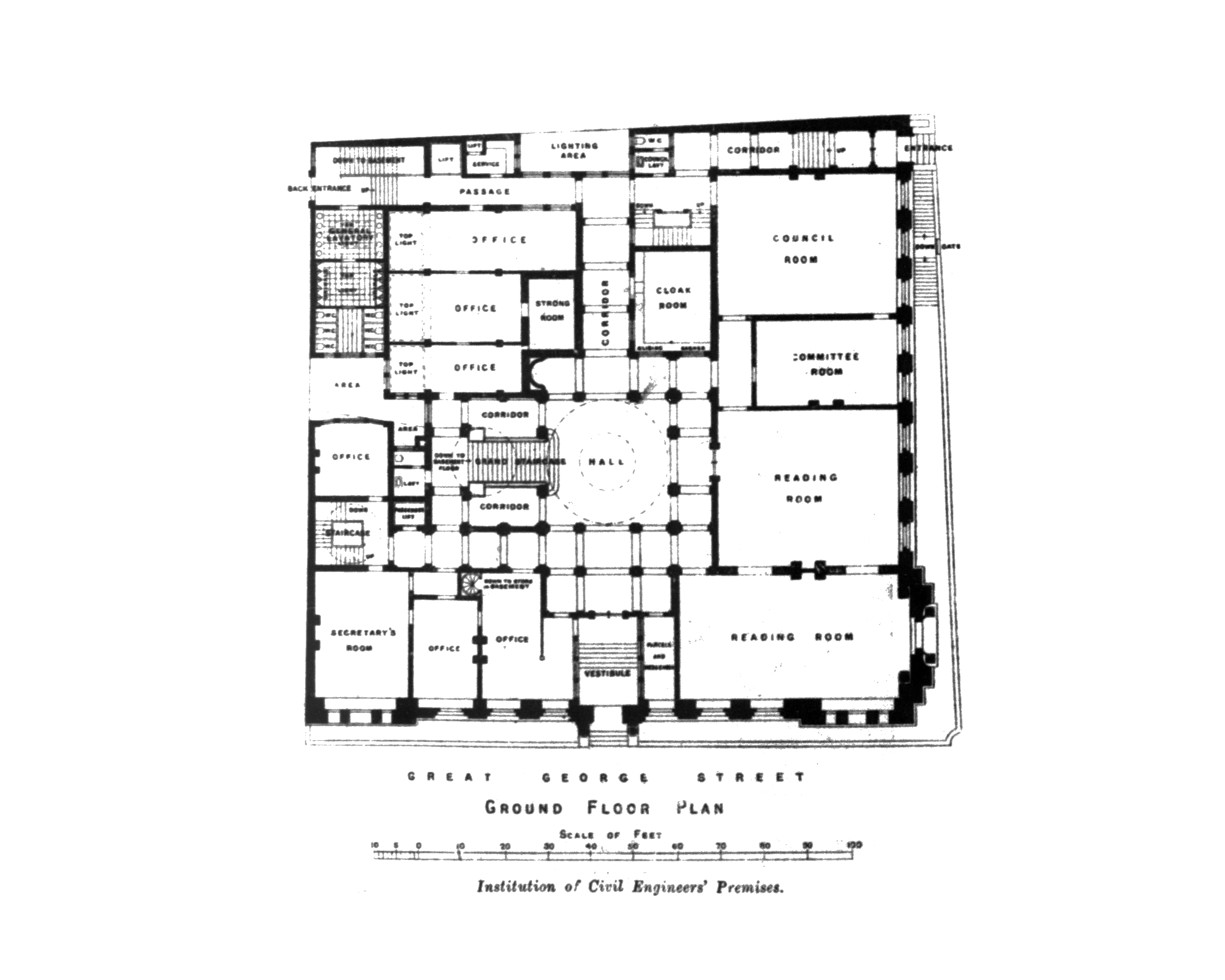
Main floor

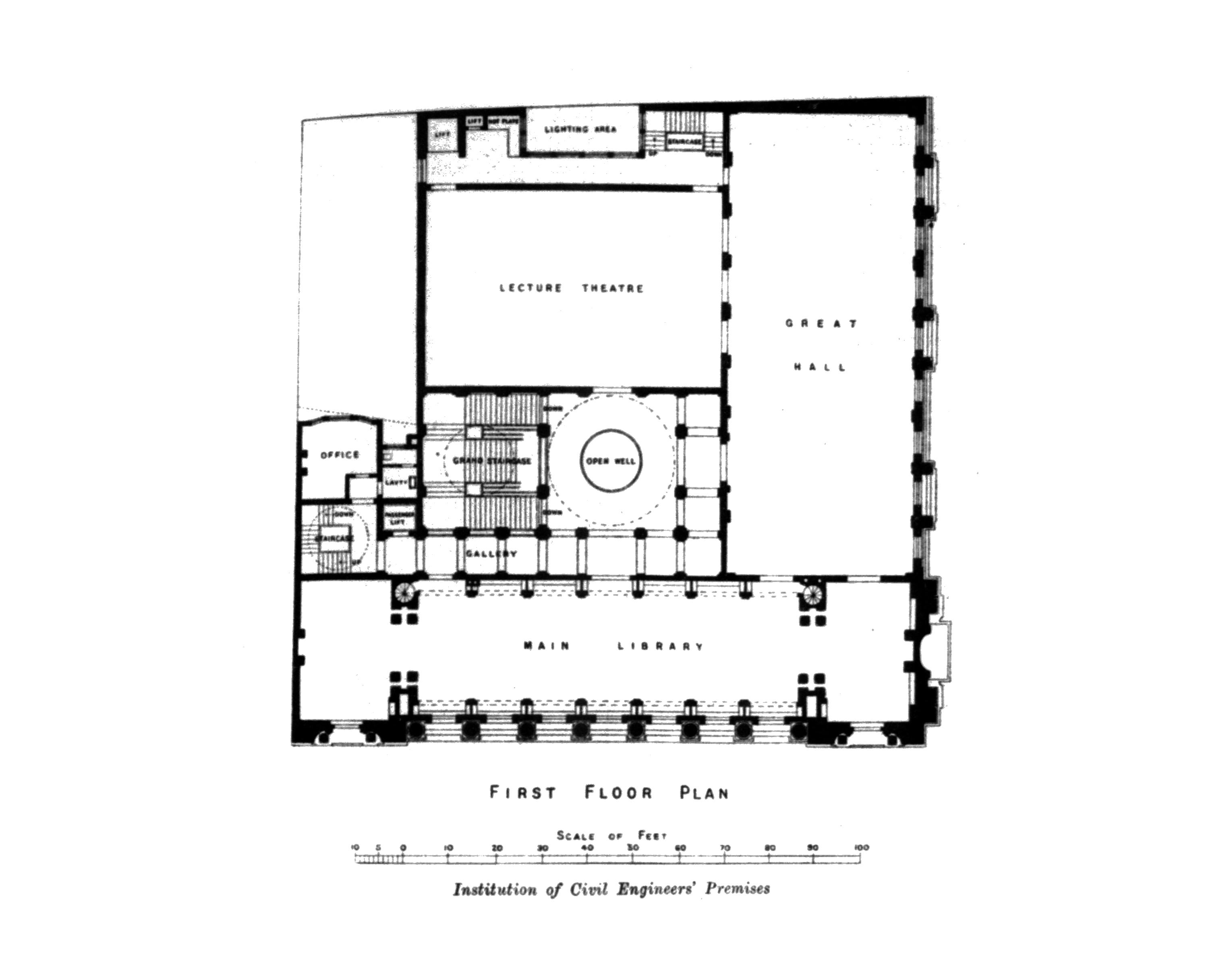
First floor
