= Great George Street =

Street in Westminster, London

Coordinates: 51.5012°N 0.12867°W

View along Great George Street toward Parliament Square

Great George Street is a street in Westminster, London, leading from Parliament Square to Birdcage Walk. The area of the current street was occupied by a number of small roads and yards housing inns and tenements. In the 1750s these were demolished and Great George Street laid out with "houses only as are fit for the habitation of persons of fortune and distinction". Part of the street was demolished in 1806 and has been a part of Parliament Square since. Between 1898 and 1915 the entire north side of the street was demolished for the construction of the Government Offices Great George Street. The street houses the headquarters of the Royal Institution of Chartered Surveyors, whose building includes the only surviving 1750s façade, and the Institution of Civil Engineers. The street formerly housed the National Portrait Gallery.

== History ==
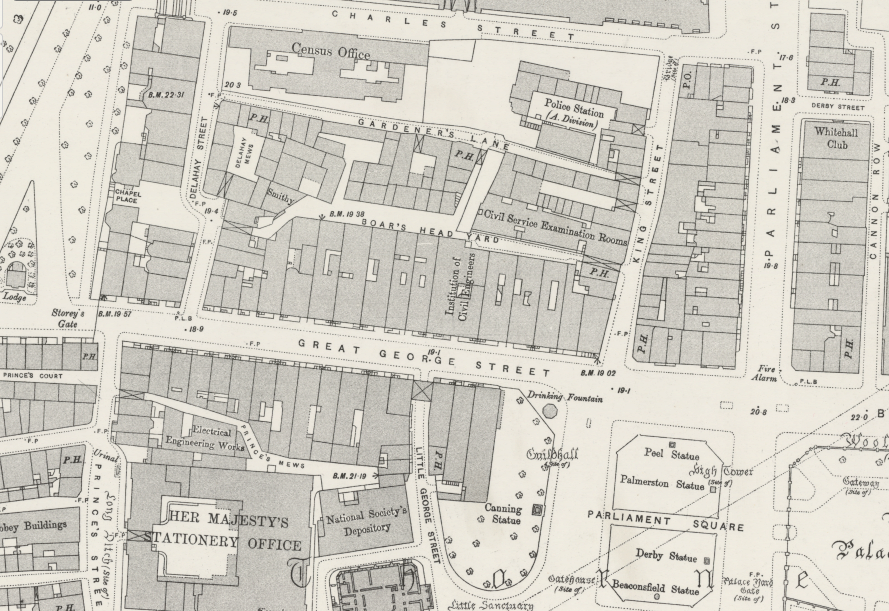
Great George Street and surrounding roads on an Ordnance Survey map, c. 1894

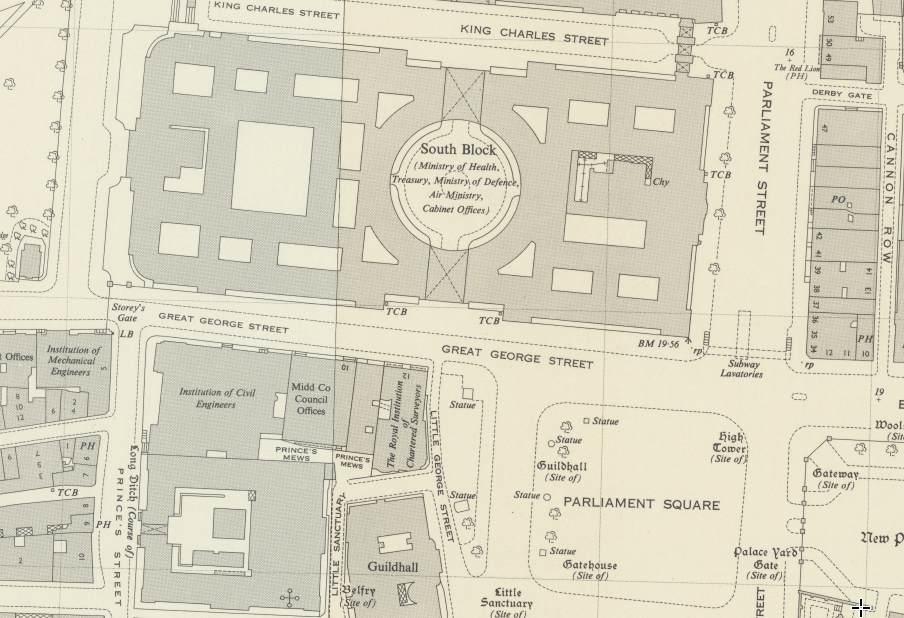
Great George Street and surrounding roads on an Ordnance Survey map, c. 1964

Much of the land that now forms Great George Street was once owned by Sir Hugh Vaughan, who had close ties to Henry VII of England. The land later passed to Peter Delahay (died 1684/5) who laid out streets and properties. Delahay's layout included Antelope Alley, Blue Boar's Head Yard, George Yard (home of the George Inn) and Bell Alley, which all ran on an east–west alignment, and the western portion of King Street, which ran between Antelope Alley and Bell Alley, as well as Delahay Street. These streets were occupied by inns and tenements. Other parts of the current street, near George Yard, were owned by Thomas Pope and included a house occupied by Sir Erasmus Dryden, 1st Baronet. Bell Alley was named after the Bell Inn and was home during the reign of Queen Anne (1702-1714) to the October Club, a group of Tory members of parliament. Jonathan Swift complained of the club in 1710-1713 a letter to Esther Johnson.

Westminster, King's Street Act 1753
- Act of Parliament
- Parliament of Great Britain
- Long title: An act to enable James Mallors to open a street from the west side of King's Street in the parish of Saint Margaret in the city of Westminster, to the back part of the houses, gardens and yards on the west side of Delahay Street in the same parish, and for other purposes therein mentioned.
- Citation: 26 Geo. 2. c. 101
- Territorial extent: Great Britain

Dates
- Royal assent: 7 June 1753
- Commencement: 11 January 1753 (Note: Start of session.)
- Repealed: 30 July 1948
Other legislation
Repealed by	Statute Law Revision Act 1948

Status: Repealed

Text of statute as originally enacted

Westminster Bridge and Bridge Street were built in 1750 and an obvious development was to extend the road westwards. The development fell to a private speculator, James Mellors, the builder of houses on Parliament Street (Whitehall). Mellors was granted an act of Parliament, the Westminster, King's Street Act 1753 (26 Geo. 2. c. 101), which stated "highly advantageous and convenient to the publick in general, as well as a great ornament to the antient City of Westminster, more especially if such houses only as are fit for the habitation of persons of fortune and distinction, were erected and built on each side of the said street". Mellors acquired land with the support of his lender, Samuel Cox. It took around three years to acquire the land and demolish existing buildings, most of the new four-storey brick houses were built by November 1755. They were slow to let and only six were occupied by the time of a 1757 ratebook, which is the first mention of Great George Street by name. A set of interior designs by Robert Adam survives in the Soane Museum and the design of the houses of this period show evidence of his influence whether by design or reuse of his craftsmen.

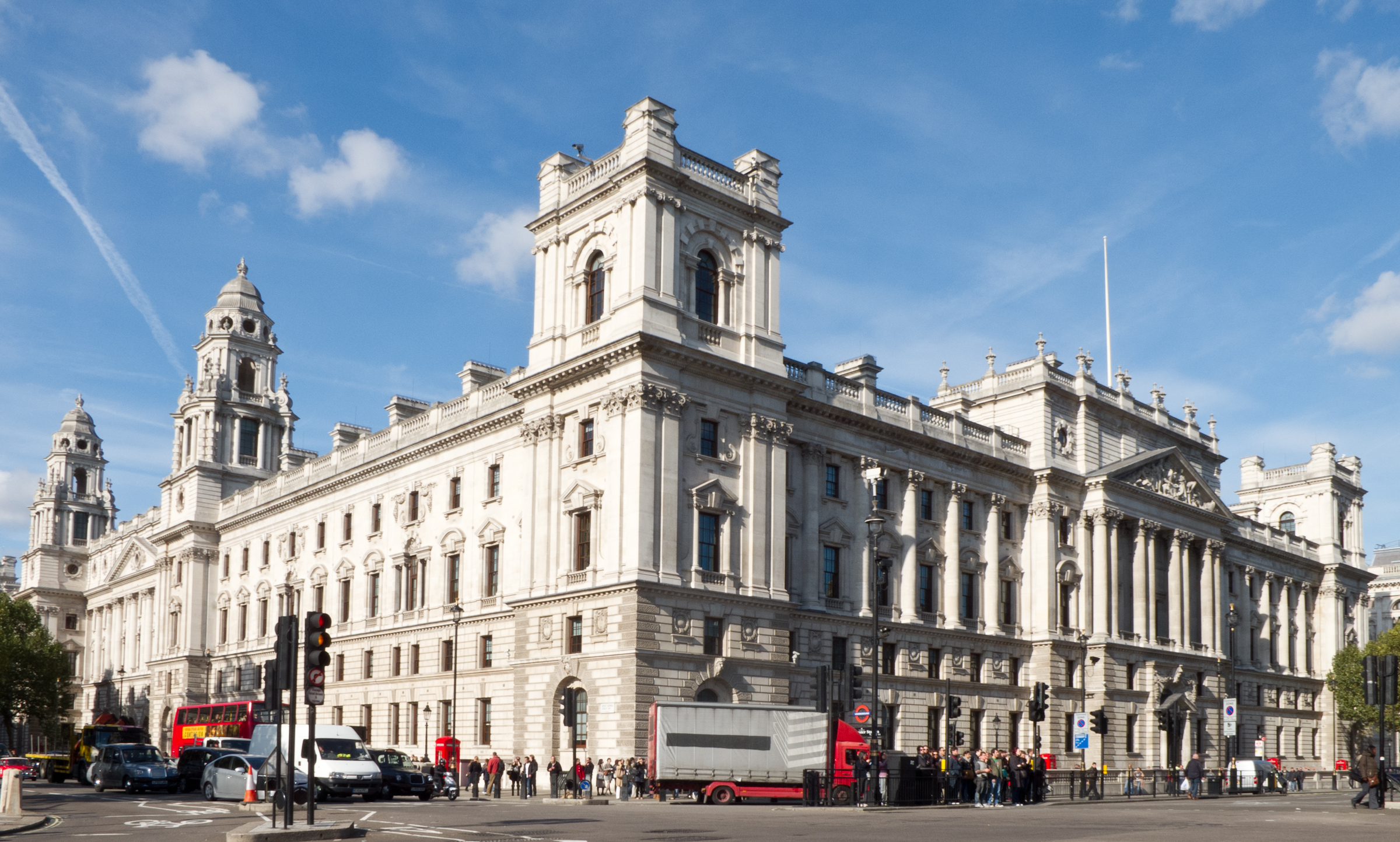
View of the Government Offices Great George Street from Parliament Square

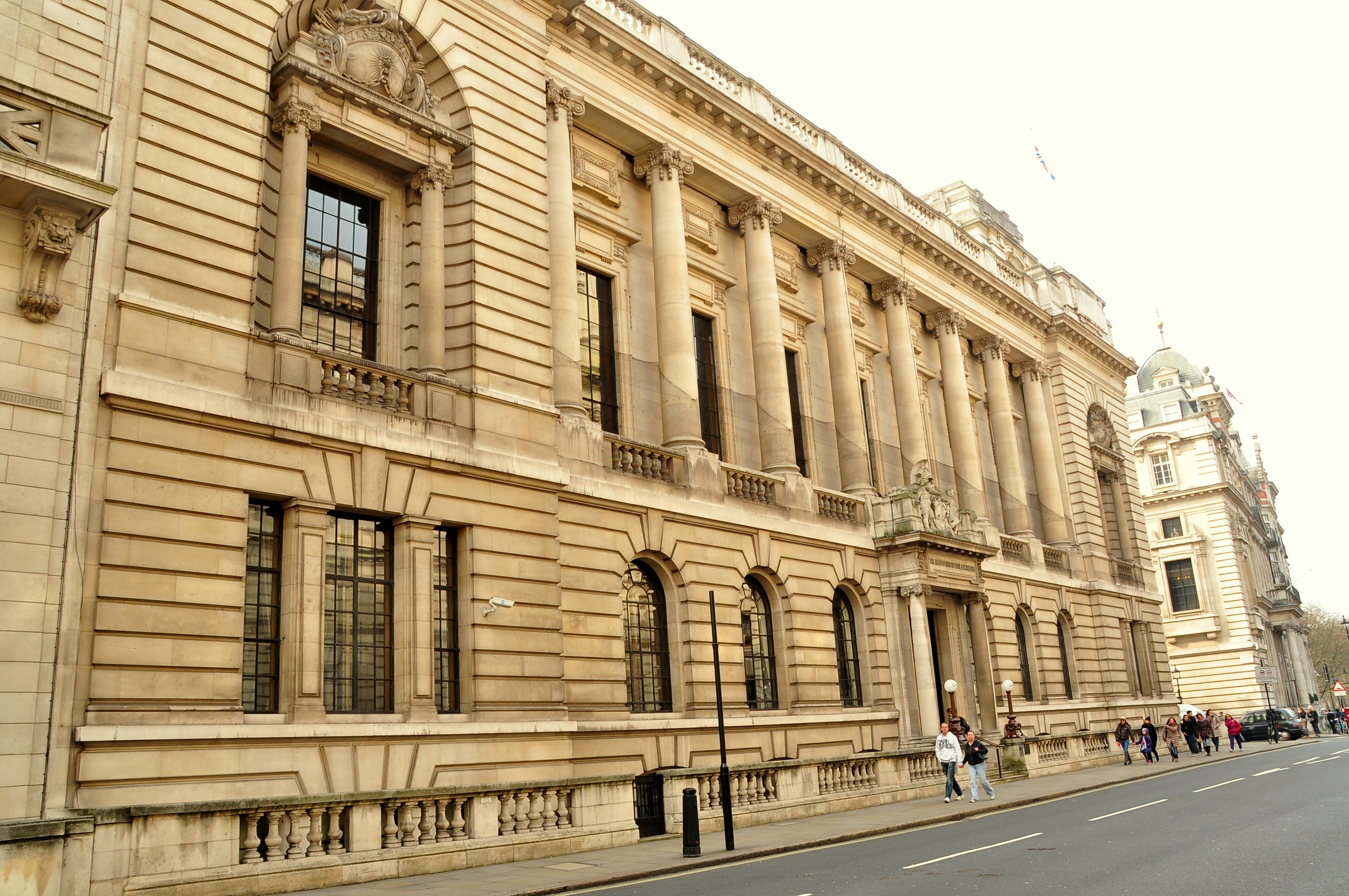
One Great George Street, headquarters of the Institution of Civil Engineers

Following the Houses of Parliament Act 1806 (46 Geo. 3. c. 89), the eastern portion of the south side of the street was demolished as part of an improvement scheme and in 1868 this part of Great George Street became one side of Charles Barry's Parliament Square. The entire north side was demolished to form new government offices, constructed in two phases in 1898-1908 and 1911–1915, these are now known as Government Offices Great George Street, designed by J. M. Brydon and Sir Henry Tanner. Tanner's design for the second phase included an early concrete frame design, whose strength led to the structure being the location for the Churchill War Rooms. Since 1940 the structure has housed most of the Treasury.

The Institution of Civil Engineers was housed at number 25 from 1839 and had extended the property in an 1868 rebuild designed by Thomas Henry Wyatt. The ICE expanded to incorporate numbers 24 and 26 in 1896, demolishing the old buildings and building a new headquarters designed by Barry. During this time the ICE temporarily occupied number 9. Following the government's acquisition of the north side of the street the ICE acquired numbers 1 through 7 on the south side and constructed a new headquarters, designed by James Miller. They remain in these premises, which are known as One Great George Street.

The only surviving façade from Mellors' original structures is number 11 (built 1756 for George Amyand) which is now part of the Royal Institution of Chartered Surveyors headquarters. The remainder of the headquarters, number 12, is an 1896-1898 Alfred Waterhouse design, and where the British Union of Fascists was launched on 1 October 1932. The National Portrait Gallery occupied number 29 between 1859 and 1870. RICS lets part of number 11 to the Roux at Parliament Square restaurant. The remaining building on the street is an office occupying numbers 8 through 10. It was previously used by Middlesex County Council and as the London offices of the Liberal Democrats. In April 2019 planning permission was granted for a proposal to convert the building into a 134-room hotel and restaurant/bar. The building was sold to Fitzrovia Limited in 2024, renovated in 2025 and is let as offices.

== Notable former residents ==
- William Cubitt - no. 6 (1837–55)
- Thomas Babington Macaulay - no. 12 (1839–40)
- John Wilkes - no. 13 (1757–63)
- Robert Stephenson - no. 24 (1857-9)
- Sir Charles Barry - no. 32 (1859–70)
- Robert Peel - no. 36 (1813)
- Liberal Democrats (UK) Party headquarters - no. 8-10 (2011–2021)

Lord Byron lay in state at no. 25 for two days in 1824.
