= Government Offices Great George Street =

UK government office building in Westminster

Coordinates: 51°30′6″N 0°7′42″W

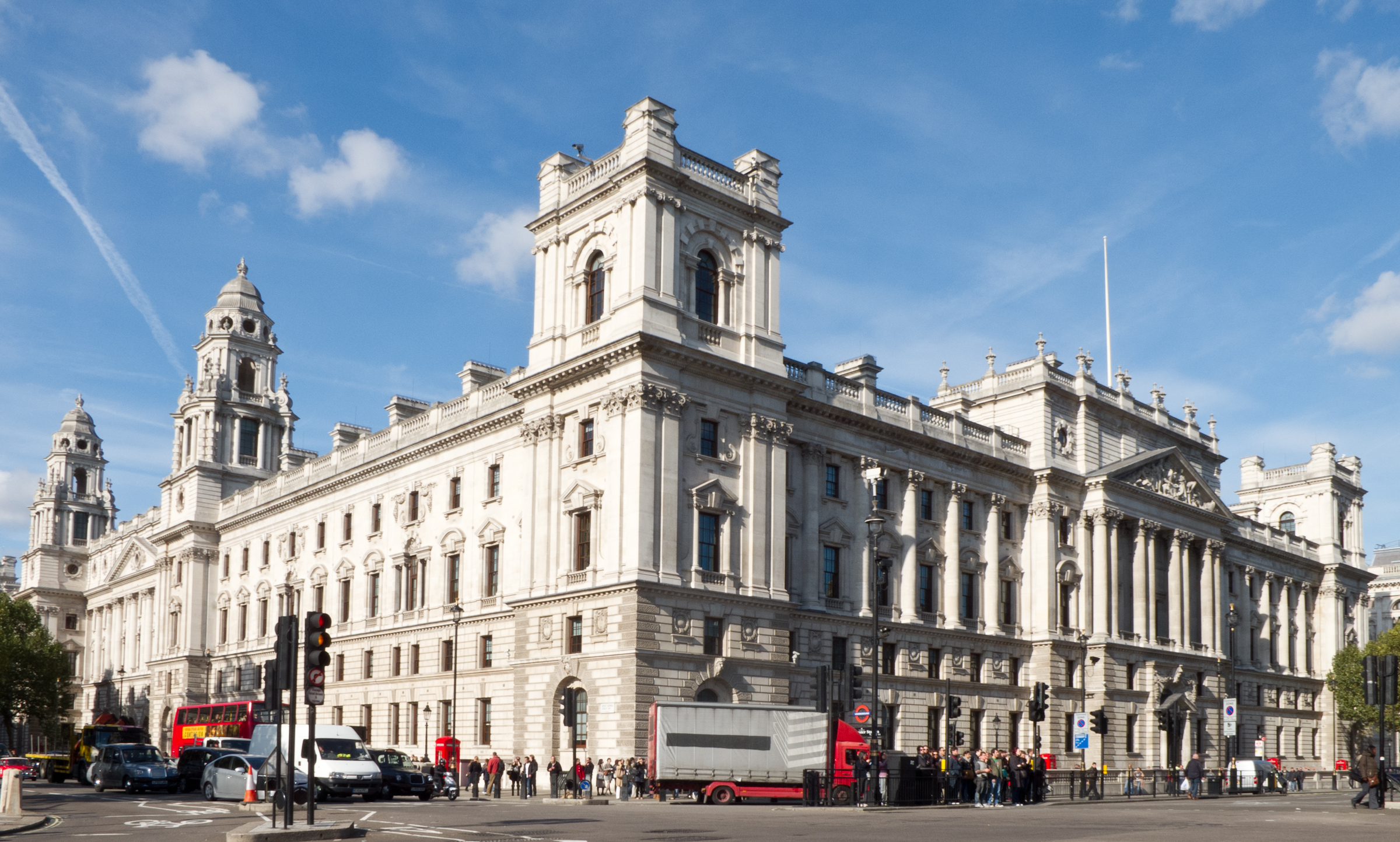
View of the southeastern corner of the building from Parliament Square

Government Offices Great George Street (GOGGS) is a large UK government office building in the Westminster district of London, England. It is situated between Horse Guards Road, King Charles Street, Parliament Street and Great George Street, on the north side of Parliament Square. The western end of the building, on Horse Guards Road, is known as 1 Horse Guards Road (1HGR). The eastern end of the building, on Parliament Street, is referred to as 100 Parliament Street (100PS).

== History ==
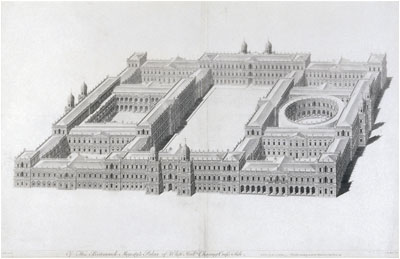
Inigo Jones's unused 1638 design for a new Whitehall Palace, engraved by an assistant and eventually published in 1749

GOGGS was designed by John Brydon following a competition in 1898. The design was "derived from Inigo Jones’ design for a new Whitehall Palace" in the 1630s. Construction took place in two phases – the eastern end was completed in 1908, and the western end was completed in 1917. It was originally built as offices for the Board of Education, the Local Government Board and the local Ministry of Works Office; HM Treasury moved into the building in 1940. During the early 1970s, the building also housed several departments of the Foreign & Commonwealth Office, primarily in the western half of the building.

A major refurbishment of the building was procured under a private finance initiative contract in 2000. The works, which were designed by Foster and Partners (together with Feilden and Mawson) and carried out by Bovis Lend Lease at a cost of £140 million, were completed in 2002. The refurbishment of 1 Horse Guards Road added extra floor space, which allowed the entire Treasury staff to be housed in the same building for the first time in some 50 years.

By the end of 2004, HM Revenue and Customs was relocated to 100 Parliament Street from Somerset House. In 2013, the Northern Ireland Office and the Department for Culture, Media and Sport moved into 1 Horse Guards Road and 100 Parliament Street, respectively.

== Description ==
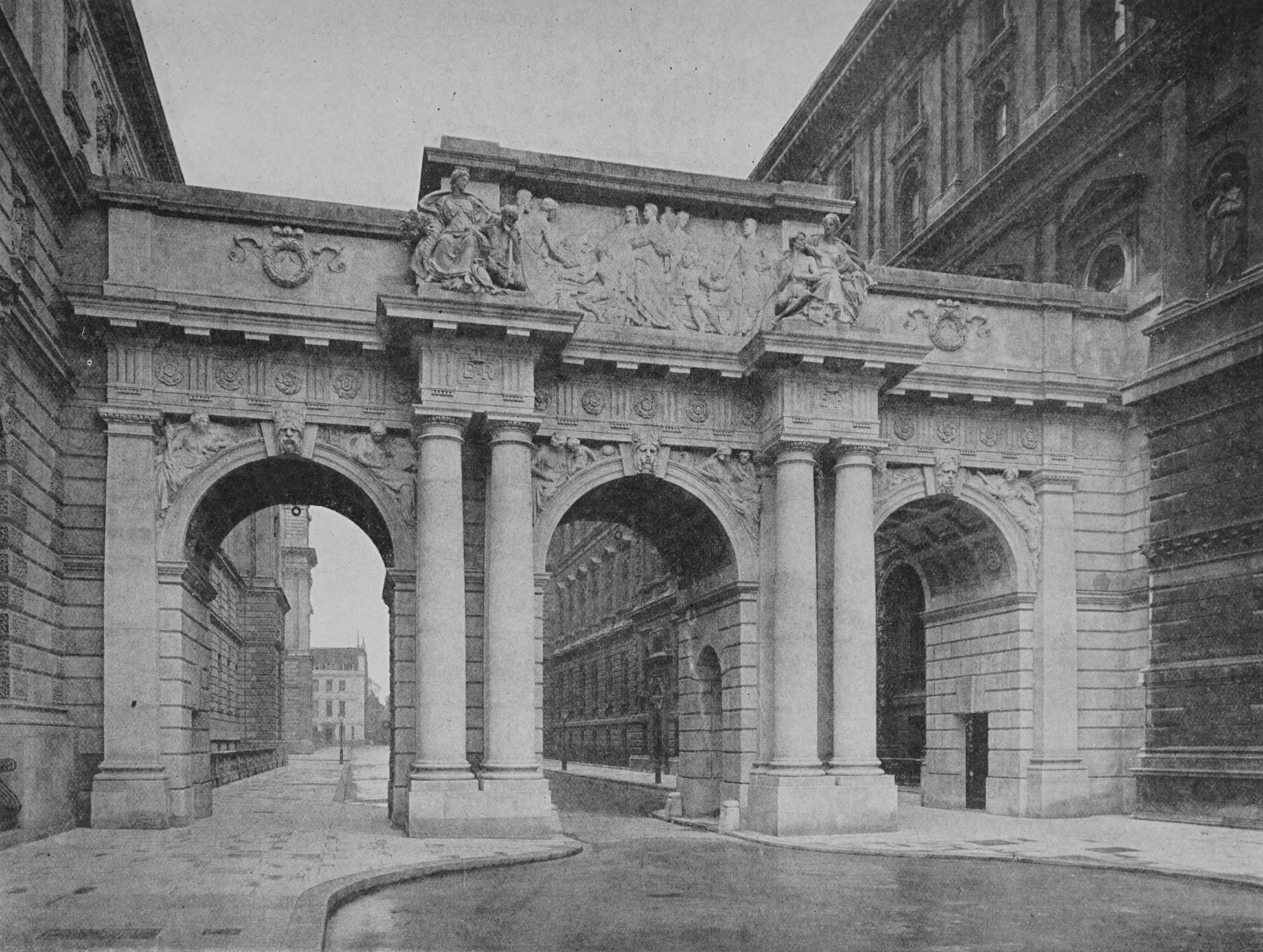
The arch on King Charles Street, designed by J. M. Brydon with sculpting by Paul Raphael Montford and William Silver Frith

The western end of the building, on Horse Guards Road, is known as 1 Horse Guards Road (1HGR) and is occupied by HM Treasury, UK Export Finance, the Government Internal Audit Agency, the Northern Ireland Office, the Office of the Leader of the House of Commons, the Office of the Leader of the House of Lords and parts of the Cabinet Office, including the Office of the Parliamentary Counsel.

The eastern end on Parliament Street, referred to as 100 Parliament Street (100PS), is occupied by the headquarters of HM Revenue and Customs, the Department for Culture, Media and Sport, and the Department for Science, Innovation and Technology.

The basement houses the Churchill War Rooms, a branch of the Imperial War Museum. Civil servants working in the building are entitled to visit the War Rooms without charge.

GOGGS is listed Grade II* on the National Heritage List for England, meaning it is of "exceptional interest and of outstanding importance". It was described by the Victorian Society as an early monument of the Edwardian Baroque Revival.

== Popular culture ==
An aerial shot of the building is used in the TV series Spooks to accompany a sub-title portraying it as the Home Office – thereby serving as a stand-in to match the distinctly period appearance of the fictitious Home Office accommodation interiors the series uses, rather than the far more modern appearance of the actual Home Office headquarters at 2 Marsham Street.

The character James Bond is seen in a courtyard of GOGGS in the movie Spectre. The building serves as MI6 headquarters after a terrorist attack on the SIS Building in Skyfall.

The GOGGS central circular courtyard and King Charles Street outside were used as the start of a London streetrace in Fast & Furious 6.

The GOGGS King Charles Street facade and central circular courtyard were used in the film Darkest Hour, showing the character Elizabeth Layton entering the War Rooms for the first time. Later in the film, GOGGS is shown in an aerial shot.
