= Birdcage Walk =

Street in the City of Westminster, London

Coordinates: 51°30′03″N 0°08′06″W

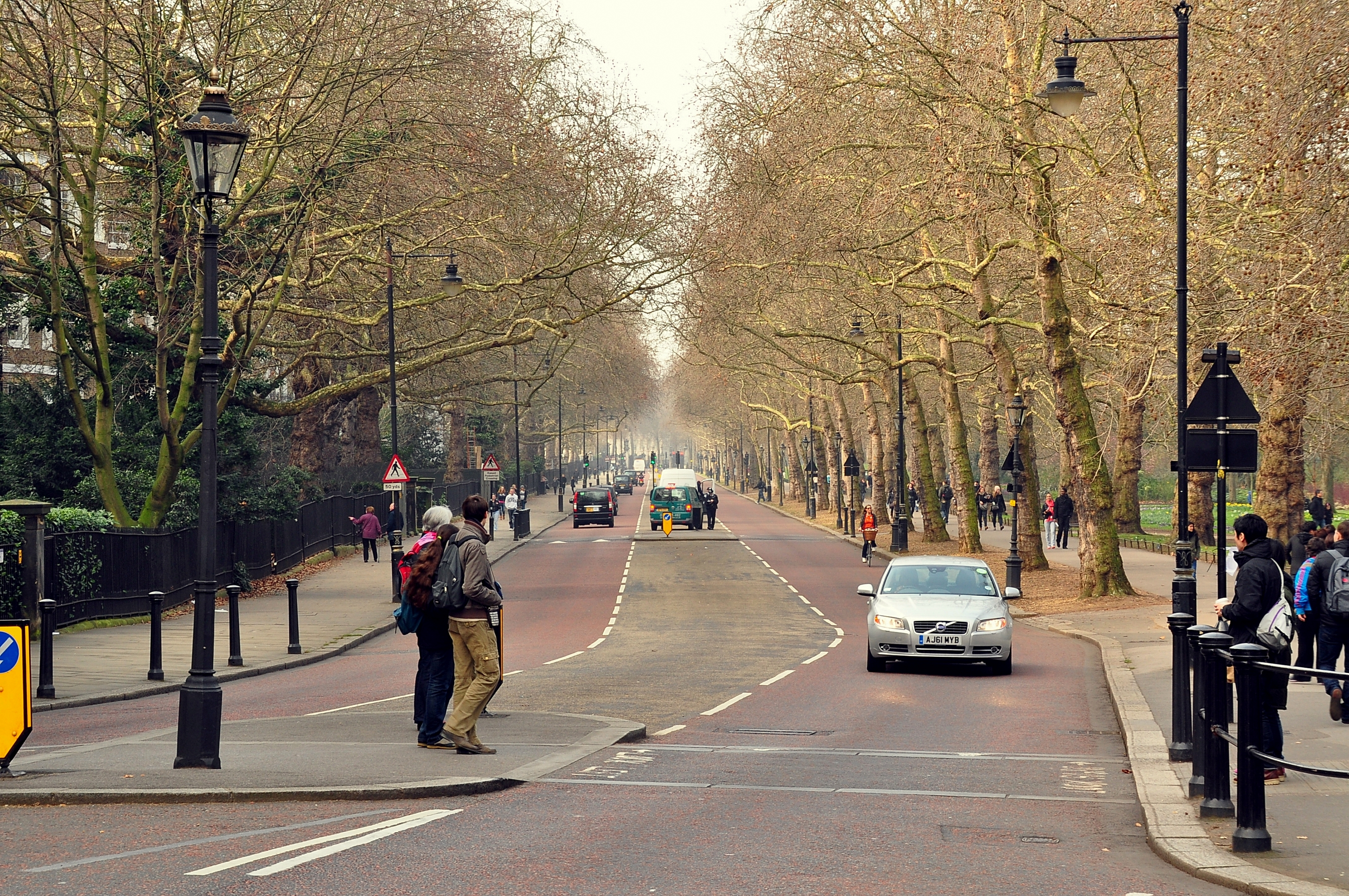
Birdcage Walk pictured in 2012

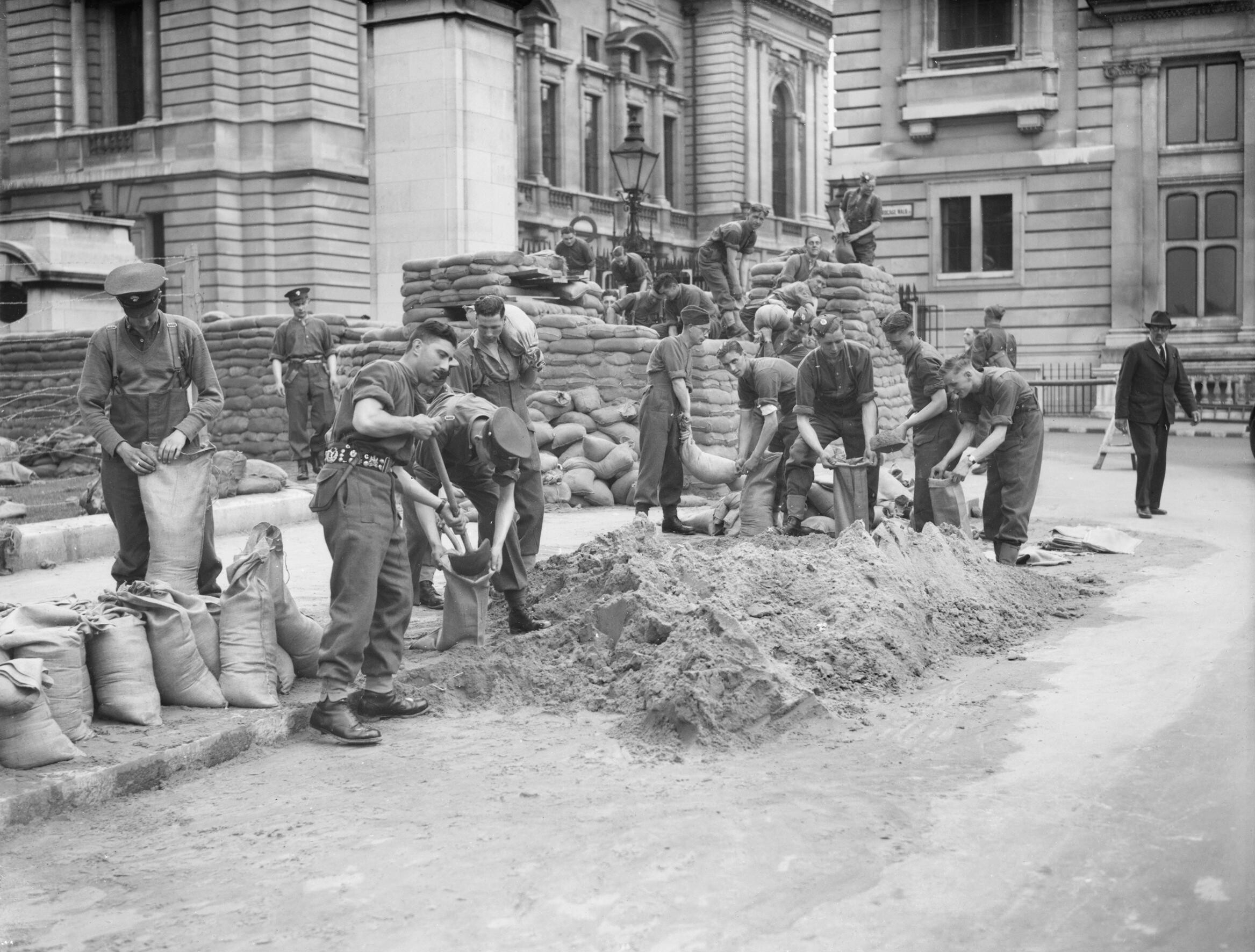
Troops from the Grenadier Guards constructing sandbag defences around government buildings in Birdcage Walk, London, May 1940

Birdcage Walk is a street in the City of Westminster in London. It runs east–west as a continuation of Great George Street, from the crossroads with Horse Guards Road and Storey's Gate, with the Treasury building and the Institution of Mechanical Engineers on the northeast corner, to a junction with Buckingham Gate, at the southeast corner of Buckingham Palace. St. James's Park lies to the north, whilst to the south are the backs of buildings on Old Queen Street, Queen Anne's Gate and Petty France, and, at the western end, the Wellington Barracks of the Brigade of Guards.

== History ==
The street is named after the Royal Menagerie and Aviary which were located there in the reign of King James I. King Charles II expanded the Aviary when the Park was laid out from 1660. Samuel Pepys and John Evelyn both mention visiting the Aviary in their diaries. Storey's Gate, named after Edward Storey, Keeper of the King's Birds at the time of Pepys, was originally the gate at the eastern end of Birdcage Walk: the name is now applied to the street leading from the eastern end to Westminster Abbey, which was formerly called Prince's Street.

Only the British royal family and the Hereditary Grand Falconer, the Duke of St Albans, were permitted to drive along the road until 1828, when it was opened to the public. A new roundabout was built at the western end in 1903.

Birdcage Walk formed part of the marathon course of the 2012 Olympic and Paralympic Games, and is part of the current route of the annual London Marathon.
