= Horse Guards Road =

Road in London, England

Coordinates: 51.5036°N 0.1291°W

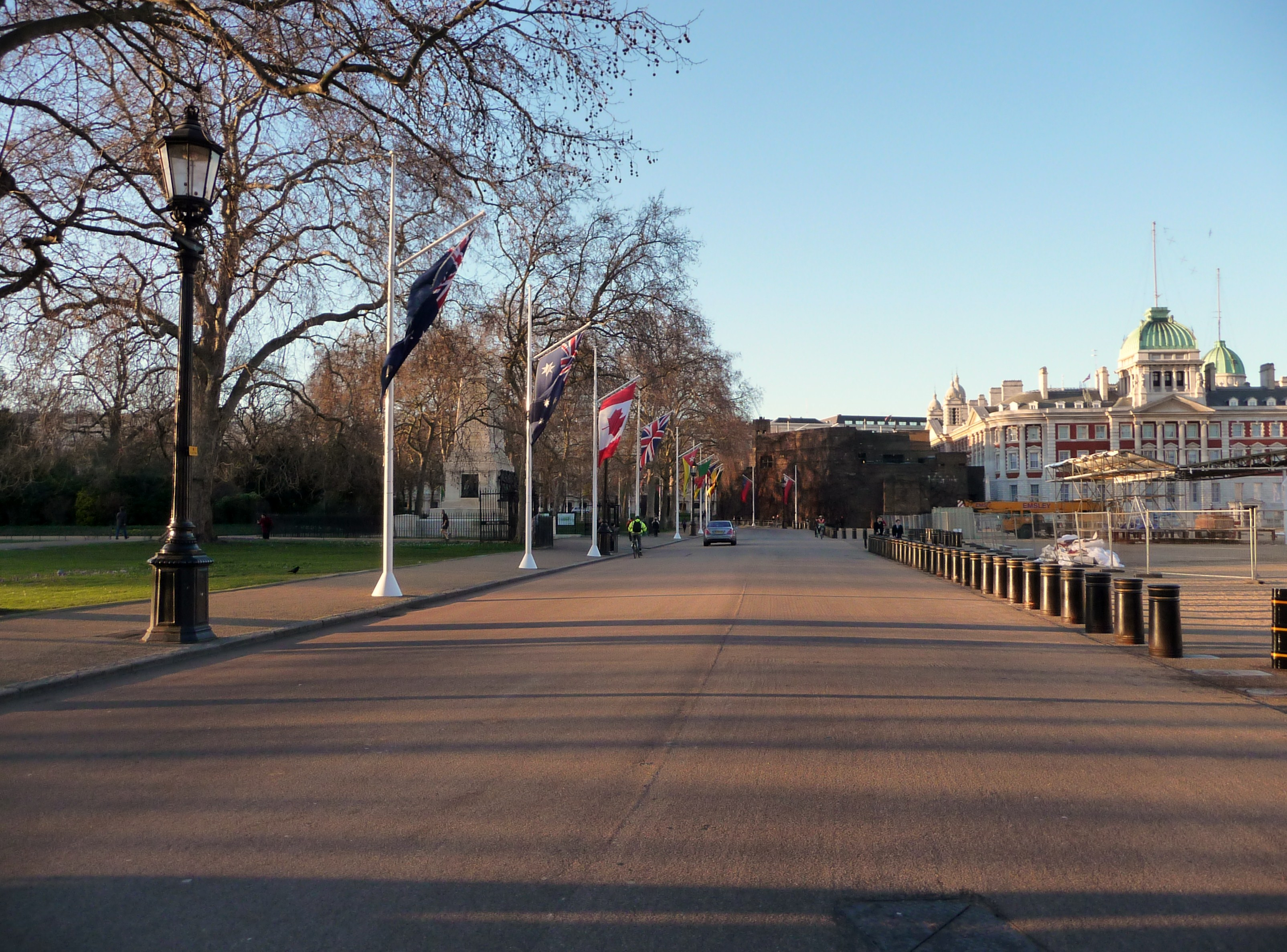
- Looking north along Horse Guards Road
- Interactive map of Horse Guards Road
- North end: The Mall
- South end: Birdcage Walk

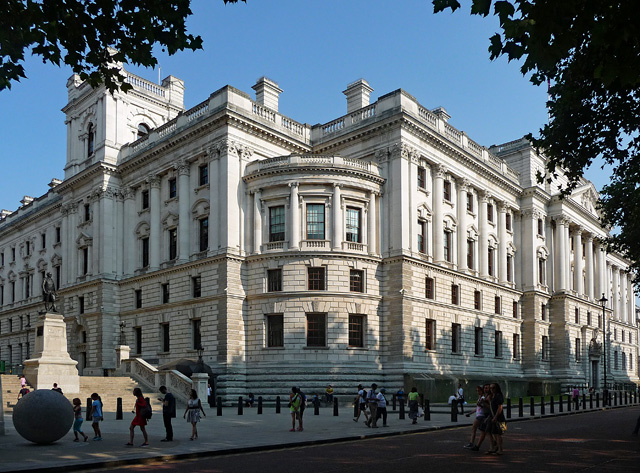
The New Government Offices at 1 Horse Guards Road

Horse Guards Road (or just Horse Guards) is a road in the City of Westminster. Located in post code SW1A 2HQ, it runs south from The Mall down to Birdcage Walk and Great George Street, roughly parallel with Whitehall and Parliament Street.

To the west of the road is St James's Park. To the east, between Horse Guards Road and Whitehall, are various government buildings, including the five interconnected Admiralty buildings. The Old Admiralty (Ripley) Building, the oldest of the government offices, was completed in 1726. The Horse Guards building, completed in 1759, originally housed barracks and government offices. Adjacent to the Horse Guards building is a large courtyard, Horse Guards Parade, where the annual Trooping the Colour ceremony is held in the presence of the reigning monarch.

His Majesty's Treasury is located in the New Government Offices at 1 Horse Guards Road. Constructed during the period 1899–1915, its basement was used as the Cabinet War Rooms during the Second World War. An underground portion of the war rooms was opened to the public in 1984.

Also to the east, between Horse Guards Road and Whitehall, are the Cabinet Office, the intersection with Downing Street (which is blocked by an iron gate), and the Foreign and Commonwealth Office (built 1888–1905).
