= Bali Bombings Memorial, London =

2006 public monument by Gary Breeze

Coordinates: 51.5023907°N 0.1295123°W

Bali Bombings Memorial
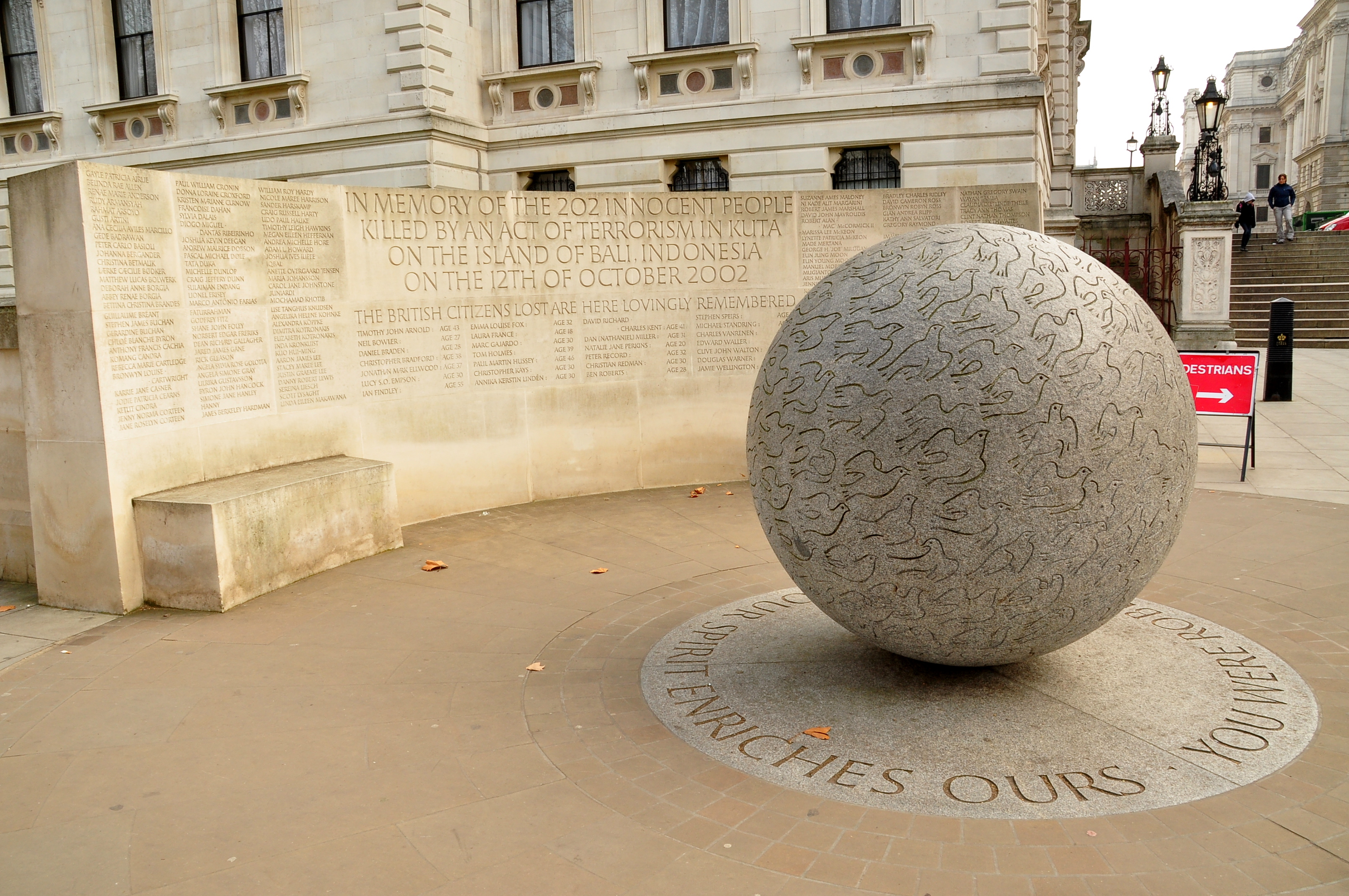
- The memorial in 2012
- Interactive map of Bali Bombings Memorial
- Location: London, SW1; United Kingdom
- Opening date: 12 October 2006; 19 years ago

The Bali Bombings Memorial is a permanent memorial in London to victims of the 2002 bombings in Bali, Indonesia. It was designed by Gary Breeze and the carving was undertaken by Martin Cook and Gary Breeze. It was unveiled on 12 October 2006, the fourth anniversary of the bombings, by the Prince of Wales and the Duchess of Cornwall, at a ceremony attended by relatives and friends of the 28 British victims.

The memorial commemorates the victims of all nationalities, with those from Britain listed apart at the centre of the inscription, which covers one side of a Portland stone wall. Standing near this wall is a granite globe with 202 doves carved across its surface. Martin Cook explained its symbolism thus: "All of the 202 doves are unique, to represent each life lost and as symbols for peace. The globe shows how the victims came from all parts of the world and how indiscriminate terrorism is".

The memorial is located at Clive Steps, near the King Charles Street entrance of the Foreign, Commonwealth and Development Office building, and faces St James's Park. A site near the Foreign Office was requested by the United Kingdom Bali Bombings Victims' Group, as a reminder to the British government of its failure to give adequate warning of the terrorist threat in Indonesia prior to the bombings. The government gave £100,000 towards the cost of the memorial.

== Gallery ==
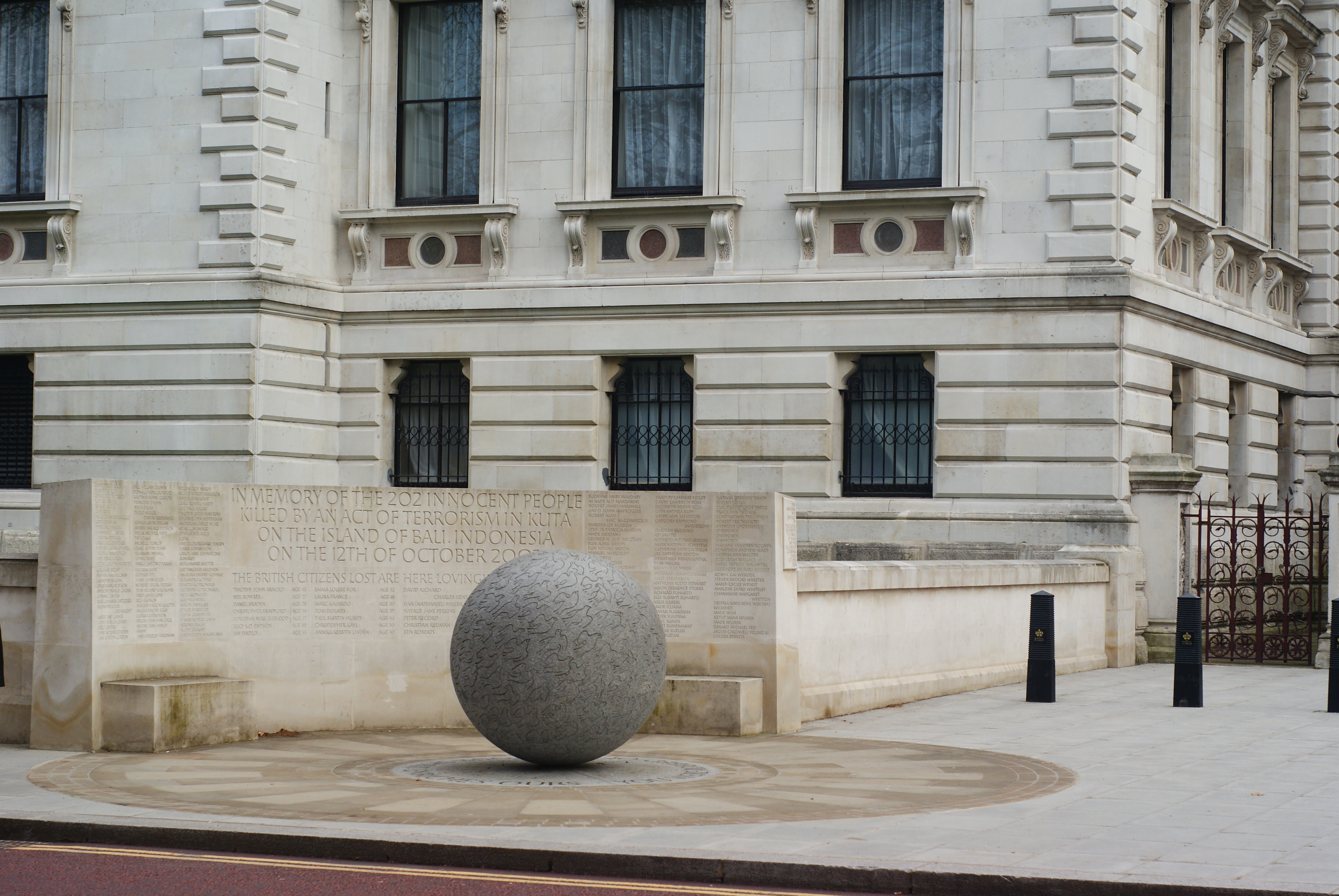
The memorial in context, at the rear of the Foreign Office

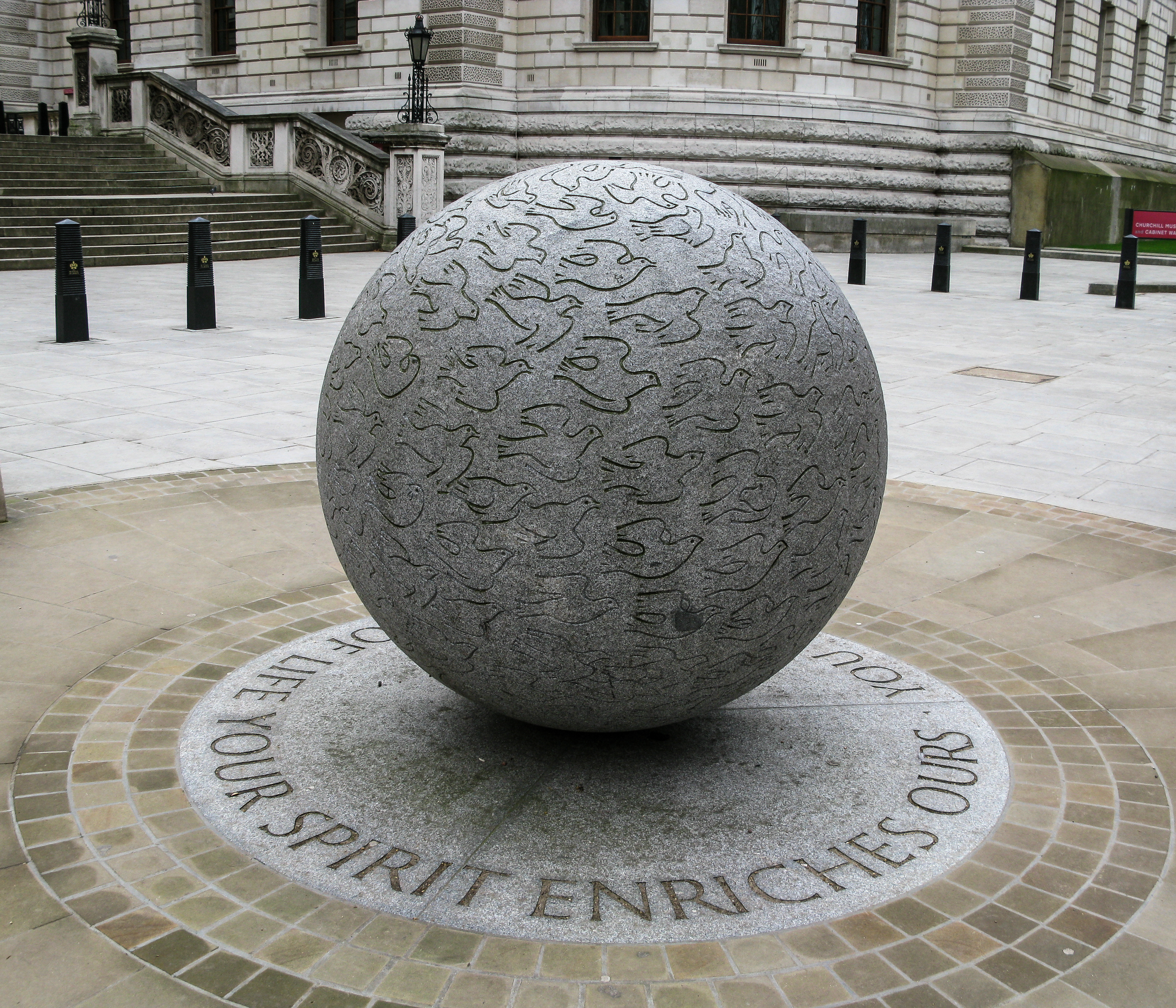
Detail of the granite globe

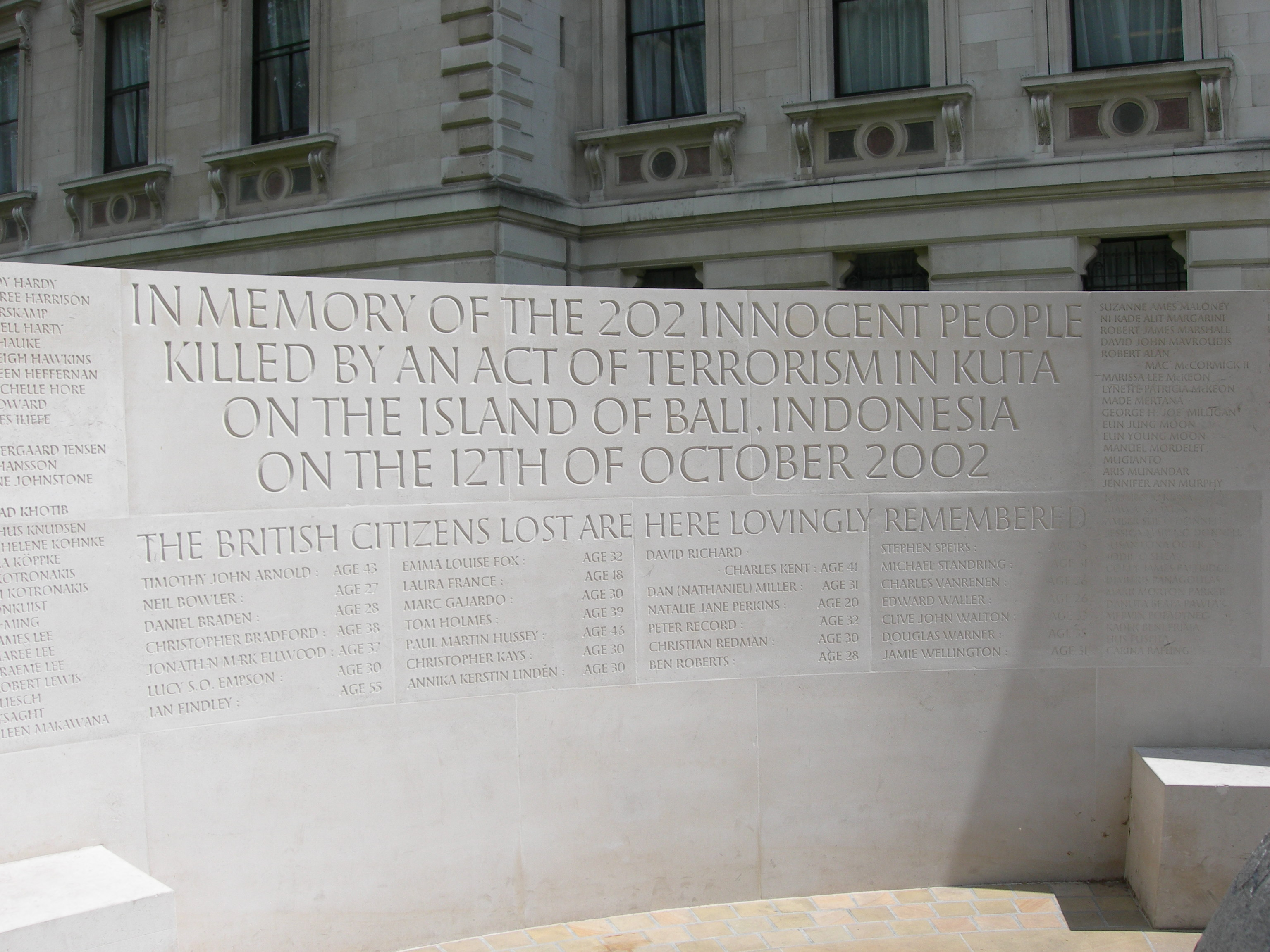
Detail of the inscription

== See also ==
- 2006 in art
- Statue of Robert Clive, London, located nearby
