= Statue of Robert Clive, London =

Sculpture by John Tweed

Coordinates: 51.502311°N 0.129242°W

Statue of Robert Clive
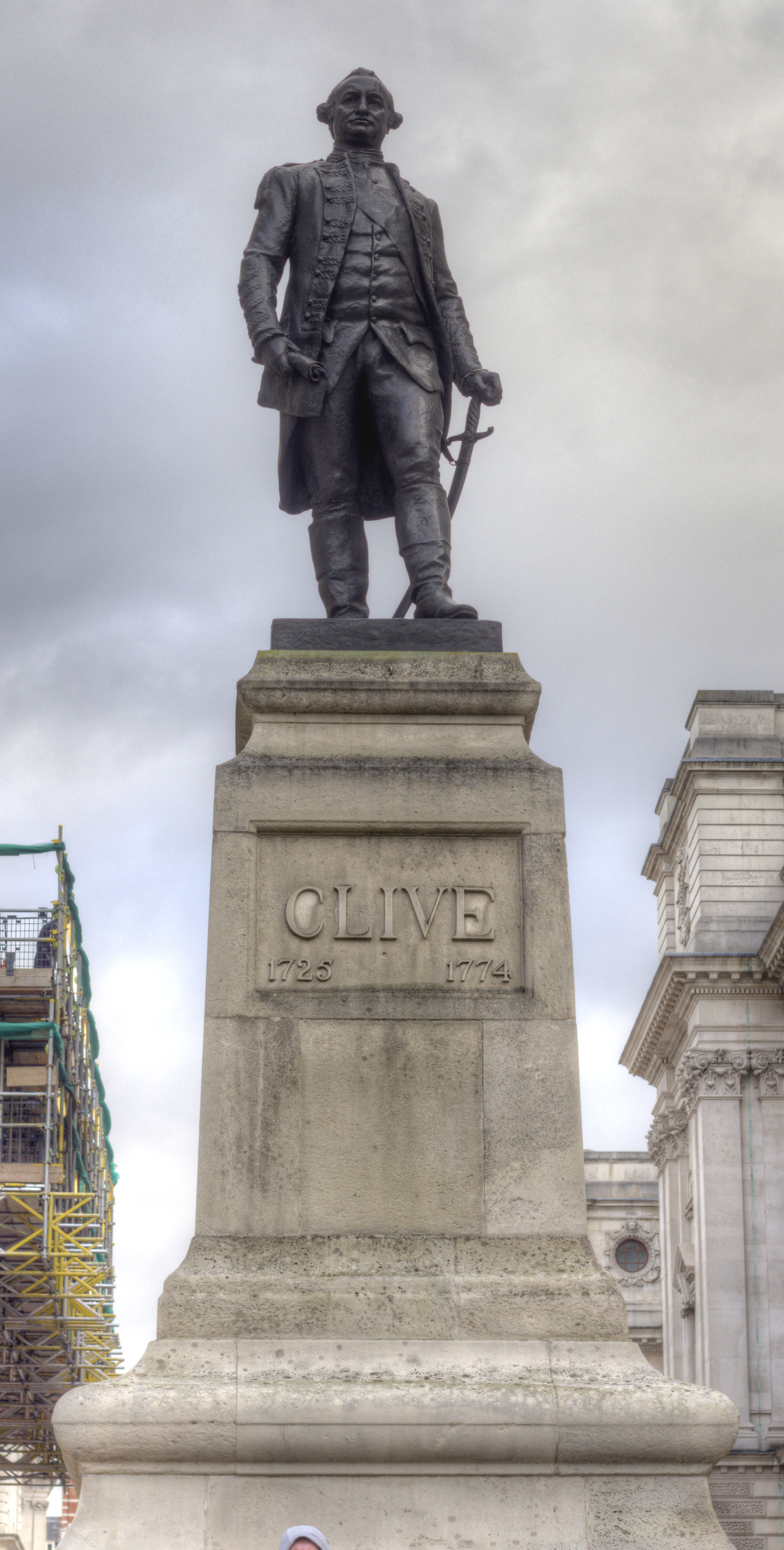
- The statue in 2010
- Artist: John Tweed
- Year: 1912
- Medium: Bronze
- Subject: Robert Clive, 1st Baron Clive
- Location: King Charles Street, London SW1

Listed Building – Grade II
- Official name: Statue of Clive on steps at west end
- Designated: 14 January 1970
- Reference no.: 1221431

A Grade II-listed bronze statue of Robert Clive, 1st Baron Clive, by John Tweed, stands in King Charles Street, Whitehall, London. The work was unveiled in 1912 outside Gwydyr House, also in Whitehall, and was moved to its current location in 1916.

== Description ==
On the west face of the plinth are Clive's surname and the year of his birth and death (1725–1774). The remaining three sides have bronze reliefs depicting events in his life: the Siege of Arcot in 1751, the eve of the Battle of Plassey in 1757 and the Treaty of Allahabad in 1765.

== History ==
On 8 February 1907, Sir William Forwood wrote to The Times noting that there were no monuments to Clive in London or India, and that even his grave, in the church at Moreton Say, Shropshire, was unmarked. Lord Curzon, a Conservative politician and the former Viceroy of India, wrote in support of Forwood's complaint, though he noted that in 1860 Clive had been "tardily commemorated by a statue at Shrewsbury". A Clive Memorial Fund committee was established, with Curzon publicising the fundraising efforts and progress with further letters to the editor of the Times. An 18th-century statue of Clive by Peter Scheemakers inside the India Office was then brought to Curzon's attention, but Curzon considered neither its portrayal of Clive nor its location to be adequate. The fund raised between £5,000 and £6,000 to erect memorials to Clive in London and India. Curzon's proposal did not meet the favour of his successor as viceroy, Lord Minto, who considered a commemoration of Clive "needlessly provocative" in India at a time of agitation and unrest in Bengal, where Clive had been the first British governor.

John Tweed was commissioned to start work on the London statue and exhibited a sketch model at the Royal Academy in 1910. The statue was unveiled in a temporary location in Gwydyr Street in 1912. It was moved to its permanent location in 1916.

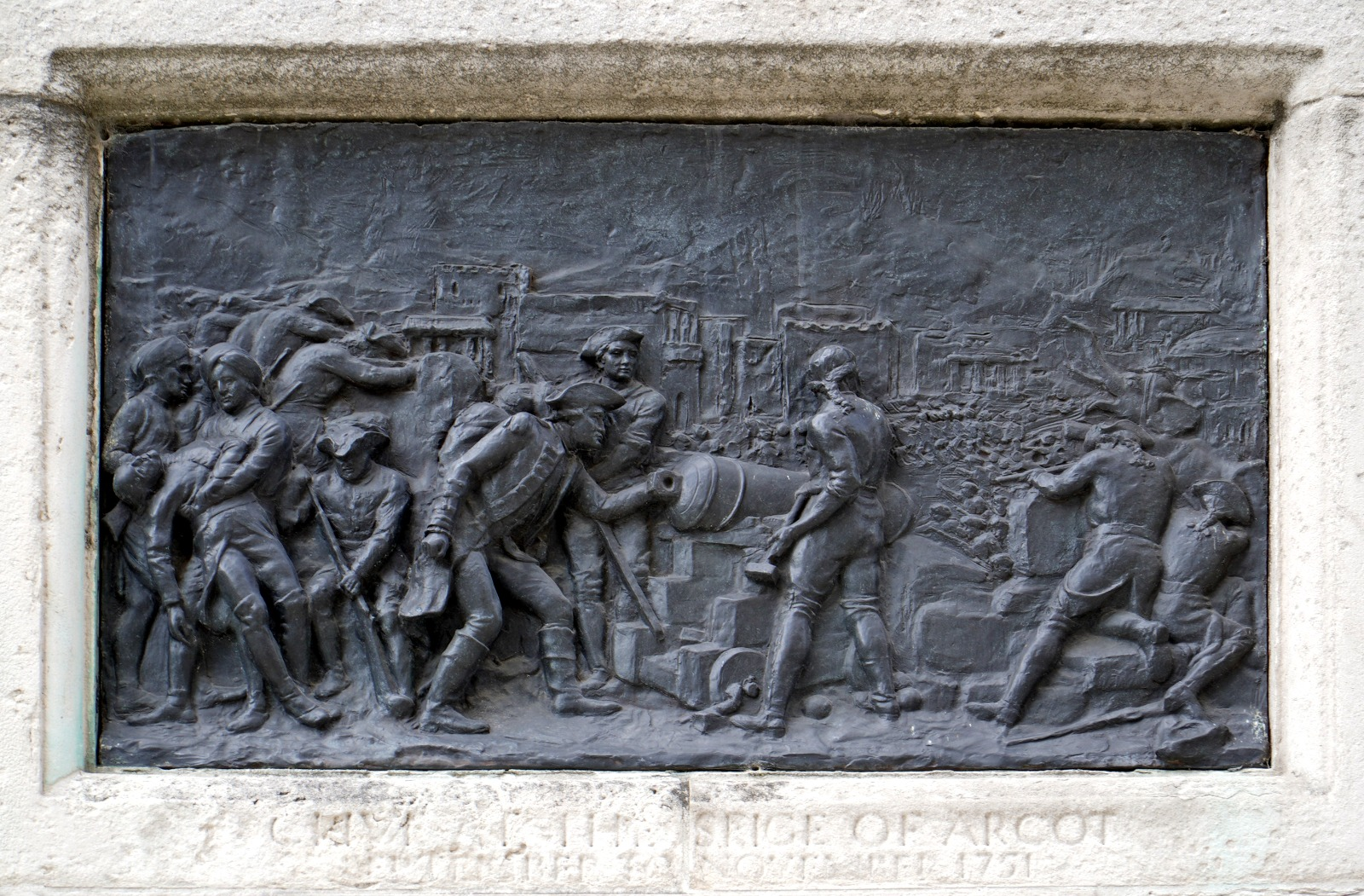
One side of the plinth of Clive statue in London, depicting the siege of Arcot

The statue is placed on a high plinth, inlaid with bronze bas-relief on three sides, depicting three historic scenes associated with Clive's career in India. The scenes are: the siege of Arcot, the Battle of Plassey 1757 and the Grant of Diwani by the Mughal emperor to the British East India Company, represented by Clive, in 1765.

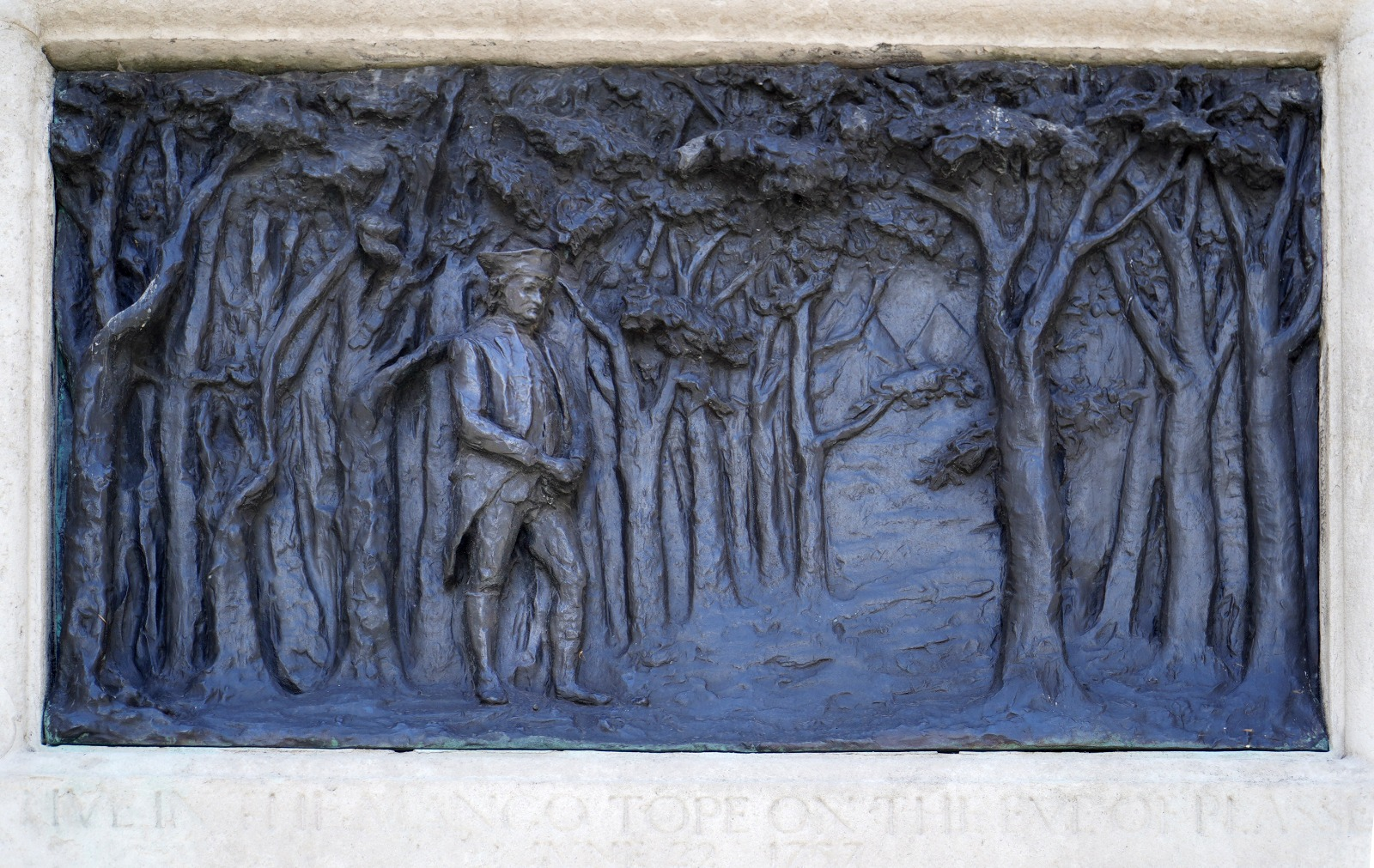
One side of the plinth of the Clive statue in London, depicting the Battle of Plassey 1757

A smaller version of the finished statue, also cast in bronze, is now part of the collection of the Tate in London. Other works by Tweed portraying Clive include a memorial tablet in the south choir aisle of Westminster Abbey, erected by public subscription in 1919, and a marble statue at the Victoria Memorial in Kolkata, India.

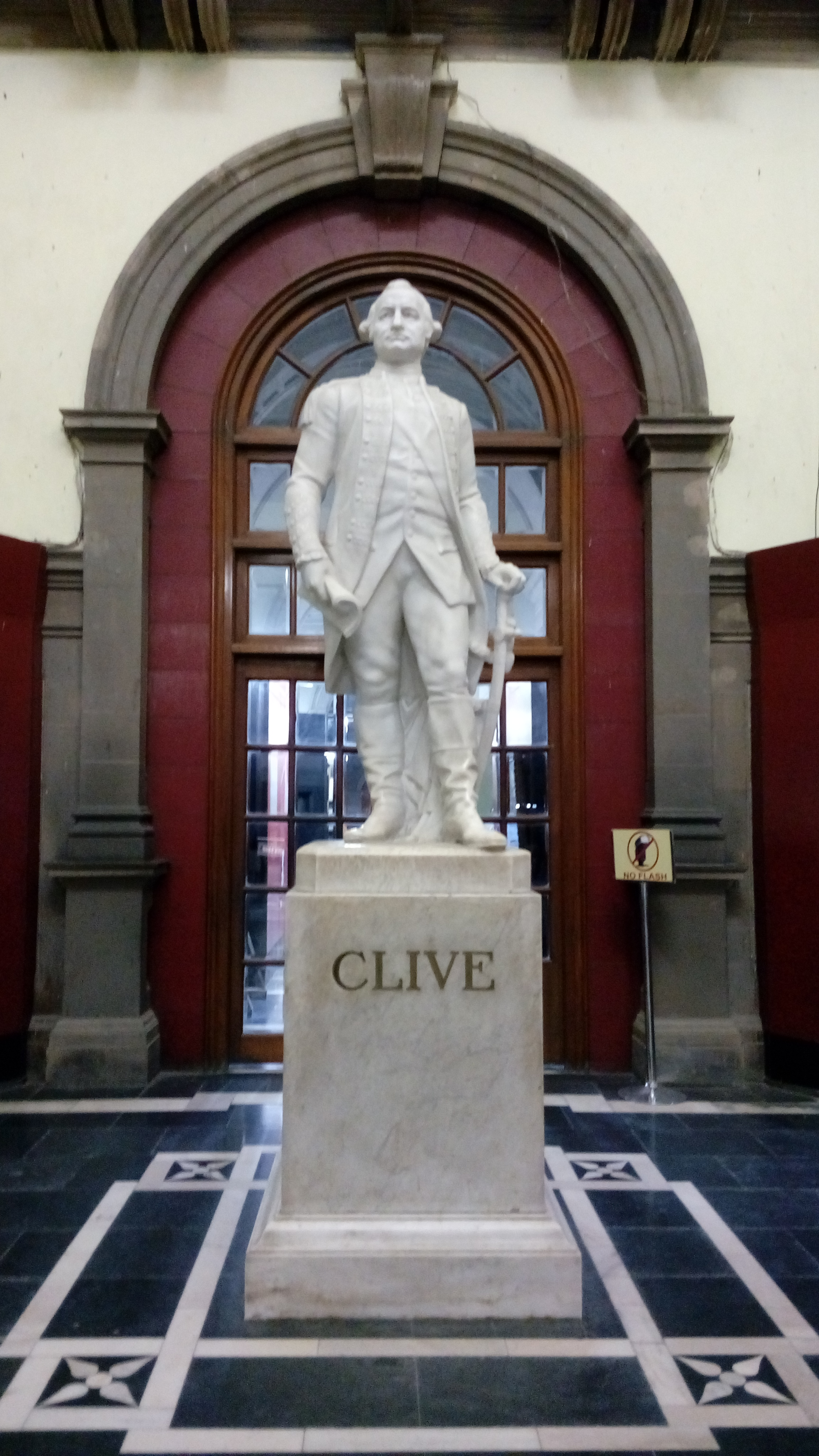
Marble version in the Victoria Memorial, Kolkata

=== 21st century ===
At the beginning of the 21st century, the statue was singled out for criticism by Nick Robins in his history of the East India Company, The Corporation that Changed the World. In the book, he argued that "the fact that one of Britain's greatest corporate rogues continues to have pride of place at the heart of government suggests that the British elite has not yet confronted its corporate and imperial past." The book concluded by calling for the statue to be removed to a museum.

In June 2020, calls were made for the statue's removal after a wave of anti-racism protests in which a statue of the slave trader Edward Colston in Bristol was pulled down. The Labour politician Lord Adonis asked the Government to begin a public consultation on the statue. Clive's statue will be considered in a review of London's public monuments ordered by Sadiq Khan, the Mayor of London. With Andrew Simms, Nick Robins repeated his call for the statue to be removed and replaced with a monument celebrating a new generation of diverse global heroes. The historian William Dalrymple compared the statue's 20th-century memorialisation of Clive to the Confederate monuments erected in the Southern United States well into the civil rights era. The writer Afua Hirsch similarly said that the statue was "not a piece of history but an attempt – when it was erected centuries after Clive's death – to rewrite it" and called Clive "a symbol of the most morally bankrupt excesses of Empire". In August 2025, Labour peer Thangam Debbonaire called for the statue's removal from its location at the Foreign Office, citing the impact on "those of us from Indian origins in the diaspora, but also visiting Indian people, Indian dignitaries, ambassadors, trade ministers" and observing that "I don't think [the statue] presents Britain in a particularly good light in the 21st century."

== See also ==
- Bali Bombings Memorial, London, located nearby
