= Slim =

Slim or SLIM may refer to:

== People ==
- Viscount Slim, a title in the Peerage of the United Kingdom
- Slim (name), a list of people with either the given name or surname
- Slim (nickname), a list of people
- Slim Pickens (1919–1983), American actor and cowboy Louis Burton Lindley, Jr.
- Slim family, a wealthy family originally from Lebanon

=== Musicians ===
- Slim (singer) (born 1977 as Marvin Scandrick), American R&B singer and lead vocalist of the group 112
- Slim Harpo (1924–1970), American blues musician
- Slim Shady, alter ego of American rapper Eminem
- Slim Thug, American rapper Stayve Jerome Thomas (born 1980)
- Slim Whitman, stage name of American country and western music singer, songwriter and musician Ottis Whitman Jr. (1923–2013)
- Fatboy Slim, stage name of Norman Cook (born 1963), English musician
- Magic Slim, American blues singer and guitarist Morris Holt (1937–2013)

=== Fictional characters ===
- Slim Goodbody, a fictional character who teaches about anatomy
- Slim, one of the alien antagonists of the 1988 film Killer Klowns from Outer Space
- Slim, the Pixl from Super Paper Mario
- Slim Bankshot, the 13th ghost that Luigi encounters in Luigi's Mansion
- Slim, a character in John Steinbeck's 1937 novel Of Mice and Men
- Slim, a walking stick in the 1998 animated film A Bug's Life

== Places ==
- Slim, M'Sila, Algeria, a town and commune
- Slim, Perak, Malaysia, a town
- Slim, Oklahoma, United States, an unincorporated community
- Slim (state constituency)

== Groups, companies, organizations ==
- SLIM, Internet provider from KPN
- Sierra Leone Independence Medal
- Sierra Leone Independence Movement
- Slim Devices, an American consumer electronics company
- Slim School, a defunct school in Malaya, named after Field Marshal Slim

=== Music groups, bands ===
- Slim (band), a rock band

== Software, computing ==
- Slim, Pixar's RenderMan Studio Shader Tool
- SLIM (Software Lifecycle Management), tools based on the Putnam model of software effort estimation

== Science, engineering, technology ==
- Structures for Lossless Ion Manipulations, a form of ion optics
- SLiM, short linear motif
- SLIM, slang for an amateur radio operator using a callsign without authorization
- Smart Lander for Investigating Moon, a Japanese space probe

== Other uses ==
- AIDS, often called "slim", especially in Africa, because of the wasting it produces in untreated victims
- Slim, a 1934 novel by William Wister Haines
  - Slim (film), a 1937 film adaptation of the novel starring Henry Fonda

== See also ==
- Slim Jim (disambiguation)
- Slimm (disambiguation)
