= Statue of Viscount Slim, London =

Statue in Whitehall, London, England

Statue of Viscount Slim
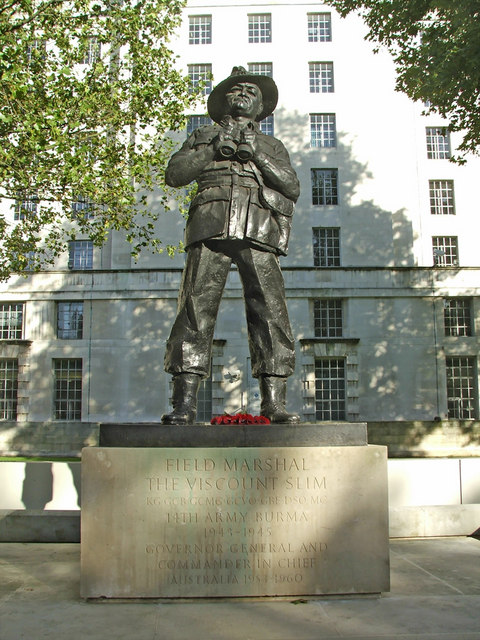
- The statue in 2006
- Artist: Ivor Roberts-Jones
- Year: 1993; 33 years ago
- Type: Sculpture
- Medium: Sculpture: Bronze; Pedestal: Portland stone
- Subject: William Slim, 1st Viscount Slim
- Dimensions: 3 m (9.8 ft)
- Location: Whitehall, City of Westminster, London SW1, England; 51.5038°N 0.1259°W

The statue of William Slim, 1st Viscount Slim in Whitehall, London, England, is a work of 1988–1993 by the sculptor Ivor Roberts-Jones. It is one of three memorials to British military leaders of World War II on Raleigh Green, outside the Ministry of Defence's Main Building, the others being Oscar Nemon's 1980 statue of Lord Montgomery and Roberts-Jones's statue of Lord Alanbrooke, erected later in 1993. Slim's bronze statue stands approximately 3 metres (9.8 ft) high on a pedestal of Portland stone.

== History ==
The campaign to erect a memorial to Slim was launched by the Burma Star Association in early 1988, when eight sculptors were invited to submit designs for a statue. Of these, five agreed to compete: Roberts-Jones, James Butler, David Norris, Christopher Marvell and Michael Rizzello. An appeal for subscriptions was launched in The Independent newspaper on 28 June, by which time planning permission had been obtained for a site near the statue of Montgomery on Whitehall. The competition's assessors requested that the artists respect the wishes of the second Viscount Slim to depict his father "as all the troops who served under his command in Burma will remember him ... in Bush hat and jungle dress".

Roberts-Jones's winning competition entry was singled out for praise by Slim's widow, who thought that the sculptor had got "Bill's stance and jawline just right", and by his son. The artist had himself fought under Slim in the Burma Campaign of World War II and was a member (albeit an inactive one) of the Suffolk branch of the BSA. Roberts-Jones regarded the field marshal as "the one genuine hero I have ever personally laid eyes on"; his encounter with Slim had occurred "in a paddy field on the road to Mandalay (in March 1945)". He would periodically re-read Slim's memoirs Defeat into Victory and Unofficial History, and apparently based the statue's pose on a photograph of Slim reproduced in his own copy of the former book.

The statue was unveiled by Queen Elizabeth II on 28 April 1993; the Queen was reported as having remarked on the day that it was "not before time" for such a tribute. The sculpture was of particular personal significance to Roberts-Jones; his assistant Brian Jarvis observed that the work was a "labour of love" for the elder artist, and Roberts-Jones was satisfied at the prospect of having Slim's statue "to be remembered by". The maquette for the statue is in the collection of the Henry Moore Institute in Leeds.

== Inscriptions ==
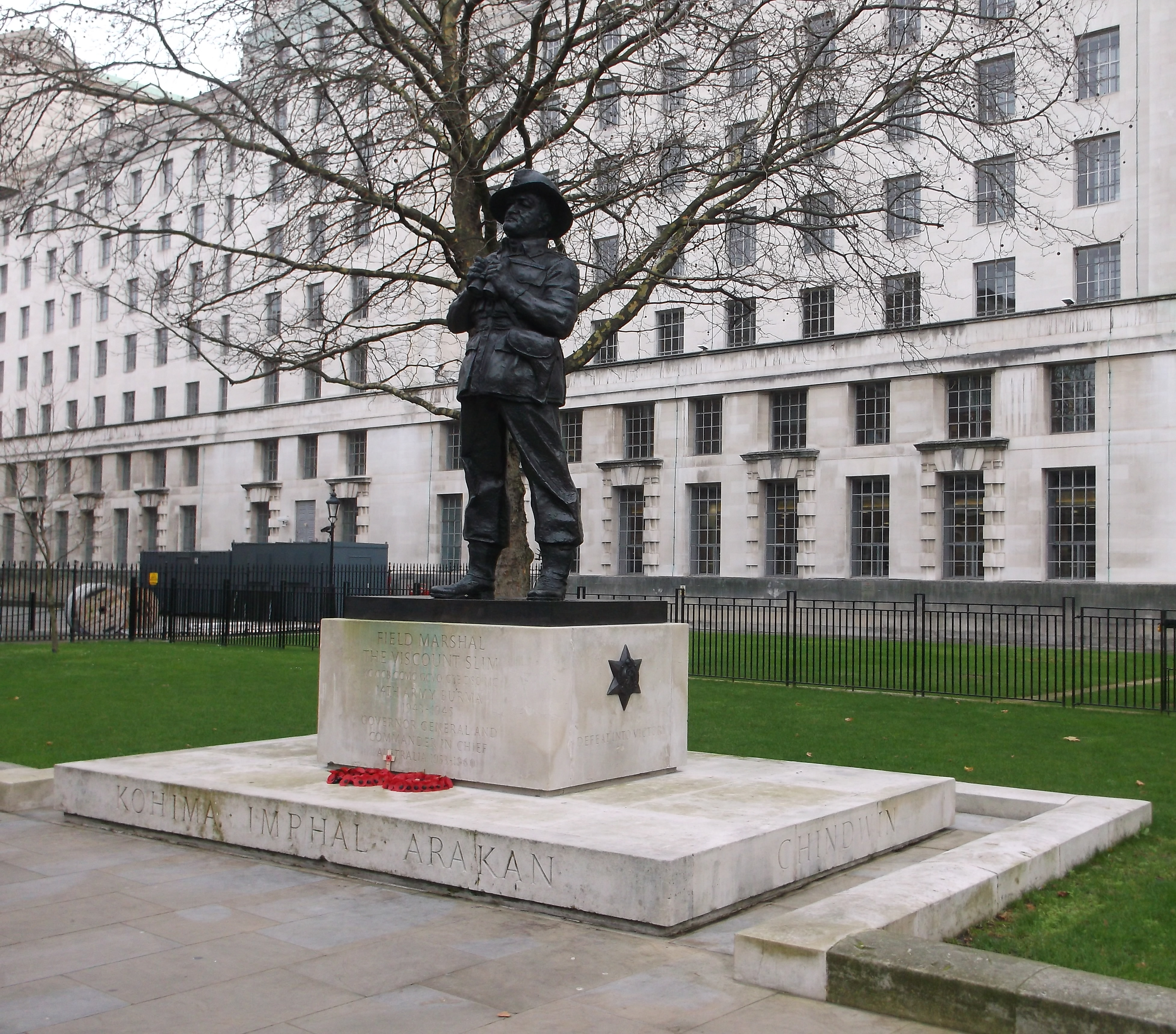
The statue in its setting on Raleigh Green, with the Ministry of Defence Main Building behind.

The inscriptions on the Portland stone pedestal were carved by David Kindersley.

Inscriptions
Pedestal	Front	FIELD MARSHAL THE VISCOUNT SLIM KG. GCB. GCMG. GCVO. GBE. DSO. MC. 14TH ARMY. BURMA 1943–1945 GOVERNOR GENERAL AND COMMANDER IN CHIEF AUSTRALIA 1953–1960
Pedestal	Back	COMMANDER IN CHIEF ALLIED LAND FORCES SOUTH EAST ASIA CHIEF OF THE IMPERIAL GENERAL STAFF GOVERNOR AND CONSTABLE WINDSOR CASTLE
Pedestal	Left and right	DEFEAT INTO VICTORY
Vertical surfaces of step	Front	KOHIMA · IMPHAL · ARAKAN
Vertical surfaces of step	Right	CHINDWIN
Vertical surfaces of step	Back	IRRAWADDY · MANDALAY · MEIKTILA
Vertical surfaces of step	Left	RANGOON · SITTANG
Statue's self-base	Back, right	IVOR ROBERTS JONES R.A.
Statue's self-base	Back, left	CAST BY MERIDIAN FINE ART LONDON

== Subject controversy ==
Following his wartime service, Silm was appointed to be the Governor-General of Australia. He has posthumously been accused of child sex abuse during this period. Locations named after Slim were ultimately renamed following these allegations.

== Bibliography ==
- Black, Jonathan (2013), "The Last Icon-Maker: Ivor Roberts-Jones and the Public Statue", in Black, Jonathan; Ayres, Sara (eds.), Abstraction and Reality: The Sculpture of Ivor Roberts-Jones, London: Philip Wilson Publishers, pp. 107–147, ISBN 978-1781300107
- Ward-Jackson, Philip (2011), Public Sculpture of Historic Westminster: Volume 1, Public Sculpture of Britain, vol. 14, Liverpool: Liverpool University Press, ISBN 978-1-84631-691-3
