= Slim (name) =

- Pronunciation: sæˈliːm, sˈliːm
- Gender: Male

Origin
- Origin: Arabic
- Meaning: Peaceful

Slim (Arabic: سليم, romanized: Slīm), is an Arabic name which can be either a given name or a surname. It is a variant of Salim or Selim. It is also an English-language surname.

Notable people with the given name or surname include:

- Slim Amamou (born 1977), Tunisian government minister
- Slim Belkhodja (born 1962), Tunisian chess Grandmaster
- Slim Dziri (1875–1953), Tunisian government minister
- Slim Mahfoudh (c. 1942–2017), Tunisian actor
- Hugo Slim, British academic and writer
- Maricopa Slim (1883–1914), American gunslinger
- Mongi Slim (1908–1969), Tunisian diplomat and the first African President of the United Nations General Assembly
- Carlos Slim Helú (born 1940), Mexican businessman and one of the richest people in the world
- Carlos Slim Domit (born 1967), Mexican businessman and son of the above
- John Slim (wrestler) (1885–1966), British wrestler who competed at the 1908 Olympics
- Slimane Benneceur, 1st Viscount Slim (1891–1970), father of Ilyes Benneceur

== See also ==
- Slim (nickname)
- Salim, an alternative spelling of the same Arabic name
