= Dziri =

Dziri is a Maghrebian surname. It means 'Algerian' in Algerian Arabic. Notable people with the surname include:

- Billel Dziri (born 1972), Algerian footballer
- Lotfi Dziri (1964–2013), Tunisian actor
- Slim Dziri (1875–1953), Tunisian politician
