= Viscount Slim =

Title in the Peerage of the United Kingdom

Viscountcy of Slim
- Gules semy of Swords erect Argent a Lion rampant Or on a Canton quarterly Azure and also Argent a Mullet of seven points Gold
- Creation date: 15 July 1960
- Created by: Queen Elizabeth II
- Peerage: Peerage of the United Kingdom
- First holder: William Joseph Slim, 1st Viscount Slim
- Present holder: Mark William Rawdon Slim, 3rd Viscount Slim
- Heir apparent: the Hon. Rufus William Rawdon Slim
- Status: Extant

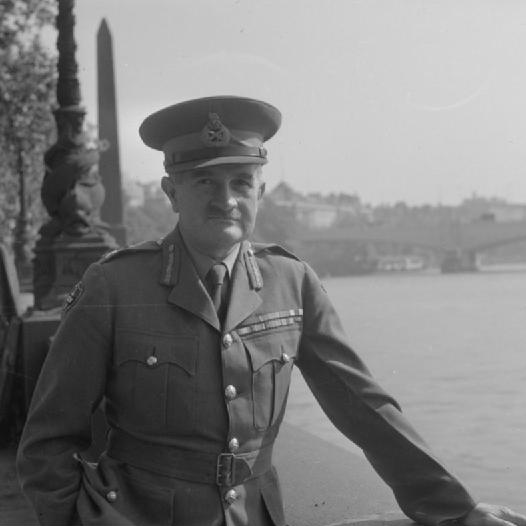
William Slim, 1st Viscount Slim.

Viscount Slim, of Yarralumla in the Capital Territory of Australia and of Bishopston in the City and County of Bristol, is a title in the Peerage of the United Kingdom. It was created in 1960 for Field Marshal Sir William Slim upon the end of his term as Governor-General of Australia.

Until 2019, the title was held by his son, the second Viscount, who succeeded in 1970 and was one of the ninety elected hereditary peers that remain in the House of Lords after the passing of the House of Lords Act of 1999, and sat as a crossbencher.

His son, the 3rd Viscount, is a chartered surveyor and a director of malt suppliers Muntons plc.

== Viscount Slim (1960) ==
- William Joseph Slim, 1st Viscount Slim (1891–1970)
- John Douglas Slim, 2nd Viscount Slim (1927–2019)
- Mark William Rawdon Slim, 3rd Viscount Slim (b. 1960)

=== Present peer ===
Mark William Rawdon Slim, 3rd Viscount Slim (born 13 February 1960), is the son of the 2nd Viscount and his wife Elisabeth Joan Spinney.

He was educated at Eton College and the University of Bristol and in 2003 was using an address at 15 Basinghall Street in the City of London. He is a chartered surveyor working in the commercial property industry, based in the City of London, an executive director of CBRE Group, a non-executive director of Muntons PLC and Oakley Properties, and chairman of the Burma Star Memorial Fund.

On 12 January 2019, he succeeded as Viscount Slim, of Yarralumla in the Australian Capital Territory and of Bishopston in the City and County of Bristol (created 1960).

With his wife Harriet Laura Harrison he has three sons:

- Rufus William Rawdon Slim (born 1995)
- William James Harrison Slim (born 1999)
- Kit Cosmo John Slim (born 2004)

In 2020 Slim was living in Dorset with his wife and sons.

=== Line of succession ===
- William Joseph Slim, 1st Viscount Slim (1891–1970)
  - John Douglas Slim, 2nd Viscount Slim (1927–2019)
    - Mark William Rawdon Slim, 3rd Viscount Slim (born 1960)
      - (1) Hon. Rufus William Slim (b. 1995)
      - (2) Hon. William James Harrison Slim (b. 1999)
      - (3) Hon. Kit Cosmo John Slim (b. 2004)
    - (4) Hon. Hugo John Robertson Slim (b. 1961)
      - (5) Solomon Joseph Abrams Slim (b. 1997)
