= Slimm =

Slimm may refer to:

- Slimm Calhoun
- Iceberg Slimm
- Trayvon Martin

== See also ==
- Slim (disambiguation)
