= Cheyney Ryan =

American philosopher (born 1948)

- Born: Cheyney C. Ryan; 1948 (age 77–78)

Education
- Education: Harvard College (BA); Boston University (MA, PhD)
- Thesis: Value, Capital, and Crisis: A Study in Philosophy and Economics (1974)
- Doctoral advisors: Alasdair MacIntyre; Marx W. Wartofsky; Thomas A. McCarthy; Howard Zinn

Philosophical work
- Era: Contemporary philosophy
- Region: Western philosophy
- School: Analytic philosophy
- Institutions: University of Oregon; University of Oxford
- Main interests: Ethics; Political philosophy; Philosophy of war; Pacifism; Social philosophy

Cheyney C. Ryan (born 1948) is an American philosopher, legal scholar, human rights educator, playwright and emeritus Professor of Philosophy and Law at the University of Oregon.

He is currently a Senior Research Fellow at the Institute for Ethics, Law, and Armed Conflict (ELAC) at the University of Oxford, where he is also a founding member of the institute. He is known for his work on nonviolence, pacifism, and the critique of just war theory. Ryan is the co-founder and co-chair of the Oxford Consortium for Human Rights (OCHR), an international initiative committed to peacebuilding and rights-based education.

Ryan has awards for his academic and activist work, including the Joseph J. Blau Prize from the Society for the Advancement of American Philosophy, an Honorary Doctorate in Humane Letters from Quinnipiac University, and recognition by The Washington Post as one of the leading scholars in peace and conflict studies.

== Early life and education ==
Cheyney Ryan was born in Los Angeles, California, to Jessica Cadwalader Ryan, a novelist, children’s author, and founder of the Oakwood School, and Robert Ryan, a prominent actor best known for his work in film noir and westerns. Both parents were deeply engaged in education and social justice, instilling in Ryan a lifelong commitment to activism and scholarship.

His political engagement began early: in 1963 he joined the Student Nonviolent Coordinating Committee (SNCC) in New York City, and later worked in antipoverty programs in Appalachian Kentucky. He participated in the 1966 March Against Fear in Mississippi and became active in anti–Vietnam War protests, including time spent working with Dorothy Day of the Catholic Worker Movement.

Originally a student at Harvard University, Ryan was expelled in 1969 for his antiwar activities. He transferred to Boston University, where he studied with Howard Zinn, Alasdair MacIntyre, and Marx Wartofsky, laying the philosophical foundation for his later work on war, pacifism, and social responsibility.

== Academic career ==
=== University of Oregon ===
Ryan taught for many years at the University of Oregon, where he held dual appointments as Professor of Philosophy and Law. He co-founded both the Peace Studies Program and the Master’s Program in Conflict Resolution, integrating philosophy, ethics, and legal education. He also advised on matters of university policy, student rights, and legal accountability, becoming a nationally recognized voice on issues related to Title IX and university governance.

=== University of Oxford ===
In 2010, Ryan was appointed as a Senior Research Fellow at the Oxford Institute for Ethics, Law, and Armed Conflict, now based in the Blavatnik School of Government. He previously served with the Changing Character of War Program and is a member of Merton College. His research focuses on war and peace, international ethics, personal responsibility, and the moral dimensions of conflict. He is also affiliated with the Carnegie Council for Ethics in International Affairs and the Institute for Advanced Studies at Loughborough University in the UK.

=== Oxford Consortium for Human Rights ===
Cheyney Ryan co-founded the Oxford Consortium for Human Rights in 2010 along with Johanna Luttrell and Hugo Slim. The Consortium organizes intensive, week-long workshops on human rights for students and faculty, held in Oxford, New York, Geneva, Brazil, and other international locations.

These workshops are especially focused on students from non-elite institutions, offering them access to Oxford-level instruction and critical engagement with global justice issues.

Workshop themes have included the intersection of human rights and climate change, the ethical and social implications of artificial intelligence, and the role of community organizing in promoting justice. OCHR has conducted over thirty-five of these workshops and reached more than a thousand participants. The program continues to expand, with plans for new conferences on war, peace, and political philosophy beginning in 2025.

== Scholarly work ==
Cheyney Ryan has published two books and more than seventy academic articles, spanning topics in moral philosophy, international law, political theory, and American pragmatism.

His work has appeared in leading academic journals and anthologies and is widely cited in the fields of peace studies and global ethics.

His most recent book, Pacifism as War Abolitionism (Routledge, 2024), argues that war must be understood not as a set of isolated events but as part of a broader "war system." In the book, Ryan critiques the just war tradition and presents pacifism as a pragmatic, systemic alternative to militarism. His earlier work, War, Sacrifice, and Personal Responsibility: The Chickenhawk Syndrome, explored the disconnect between civilian support for war and the moral obligations of participation, and remains a key text in discussions on responsibility in wartime democracies.

In 1983, Ryan’s article on pacifism was selected by The Philosopher’s Annual as one of the top ten philosophy articles of the year.

His contributions to the understanding of war in American philosophy earned him the Joseph J. Blau Prize in 2003.

== Views and opinions ==
=== Pacifism and War ===
Ryan is a prominent advocate for pacifism and a vocal critic of the just war tradition. In his writings, he argues that modern warfare is part of a self-sustaining “war system” that cannot be meaningfully constrained through ethical frameworks like just war theory. Instead, he contends that war must be abolished entirely through nonviolent means. His 2024 book, Pacifism as War Abolitionism, articulates a vision of peace based not on moral idealism but on pragmatic and systemic transformation.

He opposes the notion that war can be made more ethical by rules of engagement or legal restraints, arguing that such frameworks often serve to normalize and perpetuate violence. Ryan’s work connects pacifism with political realism, rejecting the idea that nonviolence is naïve or utopian.

=== Student rights and free speech ===
Ryan has also been active in defending student rights, especially regarding freedom of speech and due process. In 2025, he authored an open letter criticizing the University of Oregon’s disciplinary actions against student protesters of the Gaza war, calling the university’s conduct "procedurally vague and legally questionable." He has warned against the use of institutional discipline to suppress dissent and has emphasized the importance of academic institutions as spaces for ethical and political engagement.

Political and artistic activism

Ryan’s academic life has always been informed by political engagement. In addition to his early civil rights and antiwar activism, he spent the 1980s and 1990s working on farmworker issues in the American West. He co-founded Teatro Adelante, a bilingual theater group that performed anti-pesticide educational plays throughout the West Coast. Their work was featured in over fifty media outlets, including NPR and PBS, and became the subject of multiple academic dissertations.

Ryan has also worked as a playwright and musician. He co-authored the play Appalachian Ebenezer, an adaptation of A Christmas Carol set in Depression-era Appalachia, which has been performed nationwide. He later co-wrote Holy Dirt with Marcos Martinez, a play produced throughout the U.S. and internationally. In the 1980s, he performed as a pianist in several political cabaret groups and once opened for the band Toto.

== Awards ==
- Joseph J. Blau Prize, Society for the Advancement of American Philosophy (2003)
- Honorary Doctorate in Humane Letters, Quinnipiac University (2021)
- Human Rights Award, Oregon Human Rights Coalition
- Humanitarian of the Year, Lane County Jewish Federation
- Grassroots Award, National Funding Exchange
- Honored by State of Connecticut for dedication towards human rights and human rights education (2025)

== Personal life ==
Ryan is married to Sandy Stein Ryan, an artist and former professor of art at Oregon State University. They have three children, Tammy, Lisa, and Jeff, and ten grandchildren.

== Publications ==
- Ryan, Cheyney (2009), "Ch03. Chickenhawk Variations", The Chickenhawk Syndrome, Rowman & Littlefield Publishers, pp. 107–138, ISBN 978-0-7425-6505-0
- Ryan, Cheyney (23 January 2024). Pacifism as War Abolitionism. New York: Routledge. ISBN 978-1-032-68618-9.
- Ryan, Cheyney (2 February 2018), "The Pacifist Critique of the Just War Tradition", The Routledge Handbook of Pacifism and Nonviolence, New York : Routledge, 2018. | Series: Routledge handbooks in philosophy: Routledge, pp. 125–141, ISBN 978-1-315-63875-1
- Ryan, Cheyney (2014), "The Dilemma of Cosmopolitan Soldiering", in Scheipers, Sibylle (ed.), Heroism and the Changing Character of War: Toward Post-Heroic Warfare?, London: Palgrave Macmillan UK, pp. 120–141, doi:10.1057/9781137362537_9, ISBN 978-1-137-36253-7
- Ryan, Cheyney (9 June 2017), "Bearers of Hope: On the Paradox of Nonviolent Action", Soft War, Cambridge University Press, pp. 166–183
- Ryan, Cheyney C. (1977). "Yours, Mine, and Ours: Property Rights and Individual Liberty". Ethics. 87 (2): 126–141. doi:10.1086/292024. ISSN 0014-1704.
- Ryan, Cheyney C. (1983). "Self-Defense, Pacifism, and the Possibility of Killing". Ethics. 93 (3): 508–524. doi:10.1086/292463. ISSN 0014-1704.
