= Statue of Viscount Montgomery, London =

1980 statue by Oscar Nemon

Statue of Viscount Montgomery
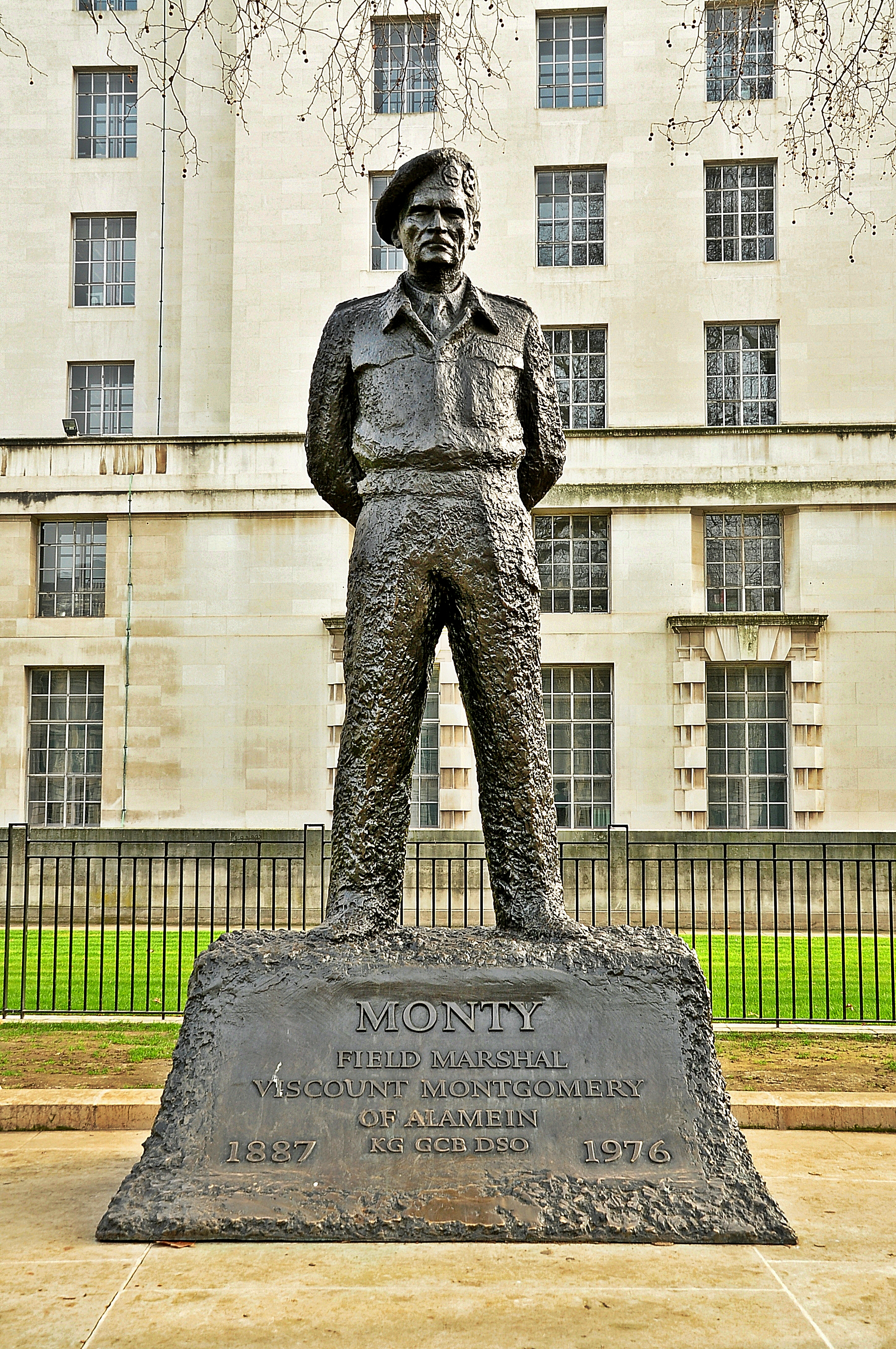
- The statue in 2012
- Artist: Oscar Nemon
- Year: 1980
- Subject: Bernard Montgomery
- Location: London, United Kingdom; 51°30′12″N 0°07′33″W

The statue of Bernard Montgomery, 1st Viscount Montgomery of Alamein is located outside the Ministry of Defence Main Building in Whitehall, London, United Kingdom. It was designed by Oscar Nemon and stands alongside statues of William Slim, 1st Viscount Slim and Alan Brooke, 1st Viscount Alanbrooke.

== Description ==
The bronze plinth's front reads: "Monty, Field Marshal, Viscount Montgomery of Alamein, KG GCB DSO, 1887–1976." The back reads:

1942–44, Commander, 8th Army North Africa & Italy
1944–45, C in C, 21st Army Group, North West Europe
1946–48, Chief of the Imperial General Staff
1951–58, Deputy Supreme Commander, Allied Powers Europe
Erected by comrades in arms & friends
