= Slim (nickname) =

Slim, as a nickname, may refer to:

- Salvacion "Slim" Lim-Higgins (1920–1990), Filipino fashion designer
- Slim Barrett (born 1960), Irish jewelry designer and artist
- Slim Dunlap (1951–2024), American rock guitarist and singer-songwriter
- Slim Dusty (1927–2003), Australian country music singer-songwriter
- Slim Gaillard (1916–1991), American jazz singer, songwriter, pianist and guitarist
- Slim Harriss (1897–1963), American Major League Baseball pitcher
- Slim Jones (1913–1938), American Negro league pitcher
- Slim Keith, Lady Keith (1917–1990), American socialite and fashion icon
- Slim Love (1890–1942), American Major League Baseball pitcher
- Slim Moon (born 1967), record producer and musician
- Amarillo Slim Preston (1928–2012), American professional gambler
- Slim Sallee (1885–1950), American Major League Baseball pitcher
- Slim Shady (born 1972), alternate stage name of Eminem, American rapper
- Slim Smith (1948–1973), Jamaican ska, rocksteady and reggae singer
- Slim Summerville (1892–1946), American actor
- Slim Whitaker (1893–1960), American actor
- Slim Whitman (1893–1960), American singer-songwriter
- Slim Wilson (1910–1990), American country music singer, songwriter, bandleader, and radio and TV personality
- Slim Wintermute (1917–1977), American basketball player

== See also ==
- Slim Jim (disambiguation)
