= Defeat into Victory =

1956 book by William Slim

- First edition
- Author: Field Marshal Sir William Slim
- Language: English
- Genre: Military history/memoir
- Publisher: Cassell and Company
- Publication date: 1956
- Publication place: United Kingdom
- Pages: 576 including 21 maps.
- ISBN: 978-0-330-50997-8

Defeat into Victory is an account of the retaking of Burma by Allied forces during the Second World War by the British Field Marshal William Slim, 1st Viscount Slim, and published in the UK by Cassell in 1956. It was published in the United States as Defeat into Victory: Battling Japan in Burma and India, 1942–1945 by David McKay of New York in 1961.

Slim was the commander of the British 14th Army, which, in concert with American and Chinese forces, defeated the Imperial Japanese Army during the Burma Campaign. Defeat into Victory is widely regarded as a classic memoir of high command.

== Structure ==
In the original 1956 edition, Slim divided his work chronologically into six "books" entitled:

- Defeat
- Forging the Weapon
- The Weapon is Tested
- The Tide Turns
- The Decisive Battle
- Victory

This structure, examining the Allied victory in terms of the resurrection of the British and Indian Armies' fighting prowess, has proved influential in the historiography of the Burma campaign. The 1961 edition condensed the content of the original publication into one book, but followed the same structure.

== Critical and popular reception ==
Defeat into Victory received positive reviews on its publications, being praised for both its insight and the quality of writing, and the fact that Slim was surprisingly candid about the mistakes he made in Burma. In a review in Military Affairs, Frank Trager describes it as "extraordinary" and making "a most valuable contribution to our understanding", and thought it instructive in the light of contemporary American involvement in Vietnam. Louis Morton, writing in The Journal of Modern History, considered it a work of "wisdom, modesty, grace, and deep understanding", and "an outstanding example of the best of British military memoirs".

In The New York Times, the writer John Masters called it "a dramatic story with one principal character and several hundred subordinate characters", and said that it showed that Field Marshal Slim was "an expert soldier and an expert writer." Defeat into Victory was also a considerable commercial success, with the first edition of 20,000 selling out almost immediately, being quickly followed by a second run. The book has been reissued several times since. and has never been out of print.
