= William Slim, 1st Viscount Slim =

British Army field marshal, Governor-General of Australia, and author (1891–1970)

The Right Honourable The Viscount Slim KG GCB GCMG GCVO GBE DSO MC PC
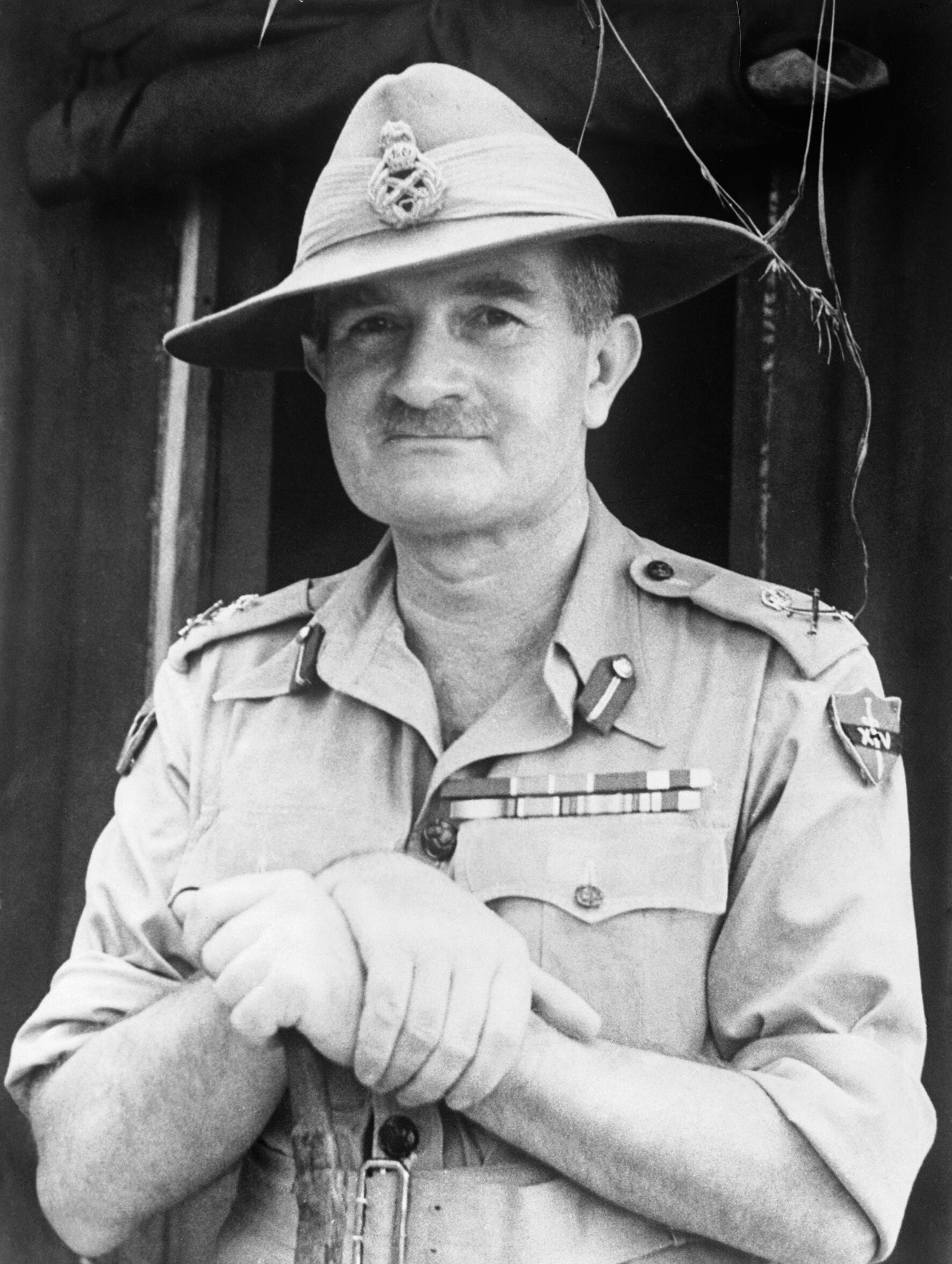
- Slim wearing the 14th Army badge

13th Governor-General of Australia
- In office 8 May 1953 – 2 February 1960
- Monarch: Elizabeth II
- Prime Minister: Robert Menzies
- Preceded by: Sir William McKell
- Succeeded by: The Viscount Dunrossil

Personal details
- Born: 6 August 1891 Bishopston, Bristol, England
- Died: 14 December 1970 (aged 79) London, England
- Resting place: Memorial plaque in St Paul's Cathedral
- Spouse: Aileen Robertson (m. 1926)
- Children: 2nd Viscount Slim; Una Mary Slim
- Education: Staff College, Quetta
- Nickname: "Uncle Bill"

Military service
- Allegiance: United Kingdom
- Branch/service: British Army; British Indian Army
- Years of service: 1914–1952
- Rank: Field Marshal
- Unit: Royal Warwickshire Regiment; West India Regiment; 6th Gurkha Rifles; 7th Gurkha Rifles
- Commands: Chief of the Imperial General Staff; Imperial Defence College; Allied Land Forces South East Asia; Fourteenth Army; XV Corps; Burma Corps; 10th Indian Infantry Division; 10th Indian Infantry Brigade; Senior Officers' School, Belgaum; 2nd Battalion, 7th Gurkha Rifles
- Battles/wars: First World War; Gallipoli Campaign; Mesopotamian Campaign; Second World War; Mediterranean and Middle East Theatre; East African campaign; Anglo-Iraqi War; Syria-Lebanon campaign; Anglo-Soviet invasion of Iran; Burma campaign; Battle of Kohima; Battle of Imphal; Battle of Central Burma
- Awards: Knight Companion of the Order of the Garter; Knight Grand Cross of the Order of the Bath; Knight Grand Cross of the Order of St Michael and St George; Knight Grand Cross of the Royal Victorian Order; Knight Grand Cross of the Order of the British Empire; Companion of the Distinguished Service Order; Military Cross; Knight of the Order of St John; Mentioned in Despatches; Chief Commander of the Legion of Merit (United States)

Field Marshal William Joseph Slim, 1st Viscount Slim (6 August 1891 – 14 December 1970), usually known as Bill Slim, was a British military commander and the 13th governor-general of Australia from 1953 to 1960.

Slim saw active service in both the First and Second World Wars and was wounded in action three times. During the Second World War he led the Fourteenth Army, the so-called "forgotten army" in the Burma campaign. After the war he became the first British officer who had served in the Indian Army to be appointed Chief of the Imperial General Staff.

In the early 1930s, Slim also wrote novels, short stories, and other publications under the pen name Anthony Mills.

== Early years ==
William Slim was born at 72 Belmont Road, St Andrews, Bristol, the son of John Slim by his marriage to Charlotte Tucker, and was baptised there at St Bonaventure's Roman Catholic church, Bishopston. He was brought up first in Bristol, attending St Bonaventure's Primary School, then St Brendan's College, before moving to Birmingham in his teens. In Birmingham, he attended St Philip's Grammar School, Edgbaston, and King Edward's School, Birmingham.

After leaving school, his father's failure in business as a wholesale ironmonger meant that the family could afford to send only one son, Slim's older brother, to the University of Birmingham, so between 1910 and 1914 Slim taught in a primary school and worked as a clerk in Stewarts & Lloyds, a metal-tube maker.

== First World War ==
Despite having no other connection to the university, in 1912 Slim joined the Birmingham University Officers' Training Corps, and he was thus able to be commissioned as a temporary second lieutenant into the Royal Warwickshire Regiment on 22 August 1914, on the outbreak of the First World War; in later life, as a result of his modest social origins and his unpretentious manner, he was sometimes wrongly supposed to have risen from the ranks. He was badly wounded at Gallipoli. On return to England, he was granted a regular commission as a second lieutenant in the West India Regiment.

In October 1916, he rejoined the Royal Warwickshire Regiment in Mesopotamia. On 4 March 1917, he was promoted to lieutenant (with seniority back-dated to October 1915). He was wounded a second time in 1917. Having been previously given the temporary rank of captain, he was awarded the Military Cross on 7 February 1918 for actions in Mesopotamia.

Evacuated to India, he was given the temporary rank of major in the 6th Gurkha Rifles on 2 November 1918. He was formally promoted to captain and transferred to the Indian Army on 22 May 1919.

== Interwar career ==
Slim became battalion adjutant with the 6th Gurkha Rifles in 1921.

On 1 January 1926, he married Aileen Robertson, daughter of Rev John Anderson Robertson (d.1941) minister of Cramond near Edinburgh. They had one son and one daughter. Later that year Slim was sent to the Staff College, Quetta. On 5 June 1929, he was appointed a General Staff Officer, Second Grade.

On 1 January 1930, he was given the brevet rank of major, with formal promotion to this rank made on 19 May 1933. His performance at Staff College resulted in his appointment first to Army Headquarters India in Delhi and then to Staff College, Camberley, in England (as a General Staff Officer, Second Grade), where he taught from 1934 to 1937. During this period, he also wrote novels, short stories, and other publications under the pen name of Anthony Mills, in order to further his literary interests, as well as to supplement his then modest army salary.

He attended the Imperial Defence College in 1937. The following year he was promoted to lieutenant colonel and given command of the 2nd Battalion, 7th Gurkha Rifles. In 1939 he was briefly given the temporary rank of brigadier as commander of his battalion. On 8 June 1939, he was promoted to colonel (again with temporary rank of brigadier) and appointed head of the Senior Officers' School, Belgaum in India.

== Second World War ==
=== East African Campaign ===
On the outbreak of the Second World War, Slim was given command of the 10th Indian Infantry Brigade of the 5th Indian Infantry Division and was sent to Sudan. He took part in the East African campaign to liberate Ethiopia from the Italians. Slim was wounded again in Eritrea. On 21 January 1941, he was hit when his vehicle was strafed by Fiat CR.42 fighters during the advance on Agordat.

=== Middle East ===
Recovering from his wounds but still unfit for active service, Slim was temporarily employed on the General Staff at GHQ in Delhi. He was involved in the planning for potential operations in Iraq where trouble was expected. By early May 1941 Slim had been appointed Brigadier General Staff (chief staff officer) to Edward Quinan the commander designate for operations in Iraq, arriving in Basra on 7 May. Not long afterwards, Major-General Fraser, commanding the 10th Indian Infantry Division, fell ill and was relieved of his command, and Slim was promoted to take his place on 15 May 1941 with the acting rank of major-general.

He led the Indian 10th Infantry Division as part of Iraqforce during the Anglo-Iraqi War, the Syria–Lebanon campaign (where the division advanced up the river Euphrates to capture Deir ez-Zor), and the invasion of Persia. He was twice mentioned in dispatches during 1941.

=== Burma campaign ===
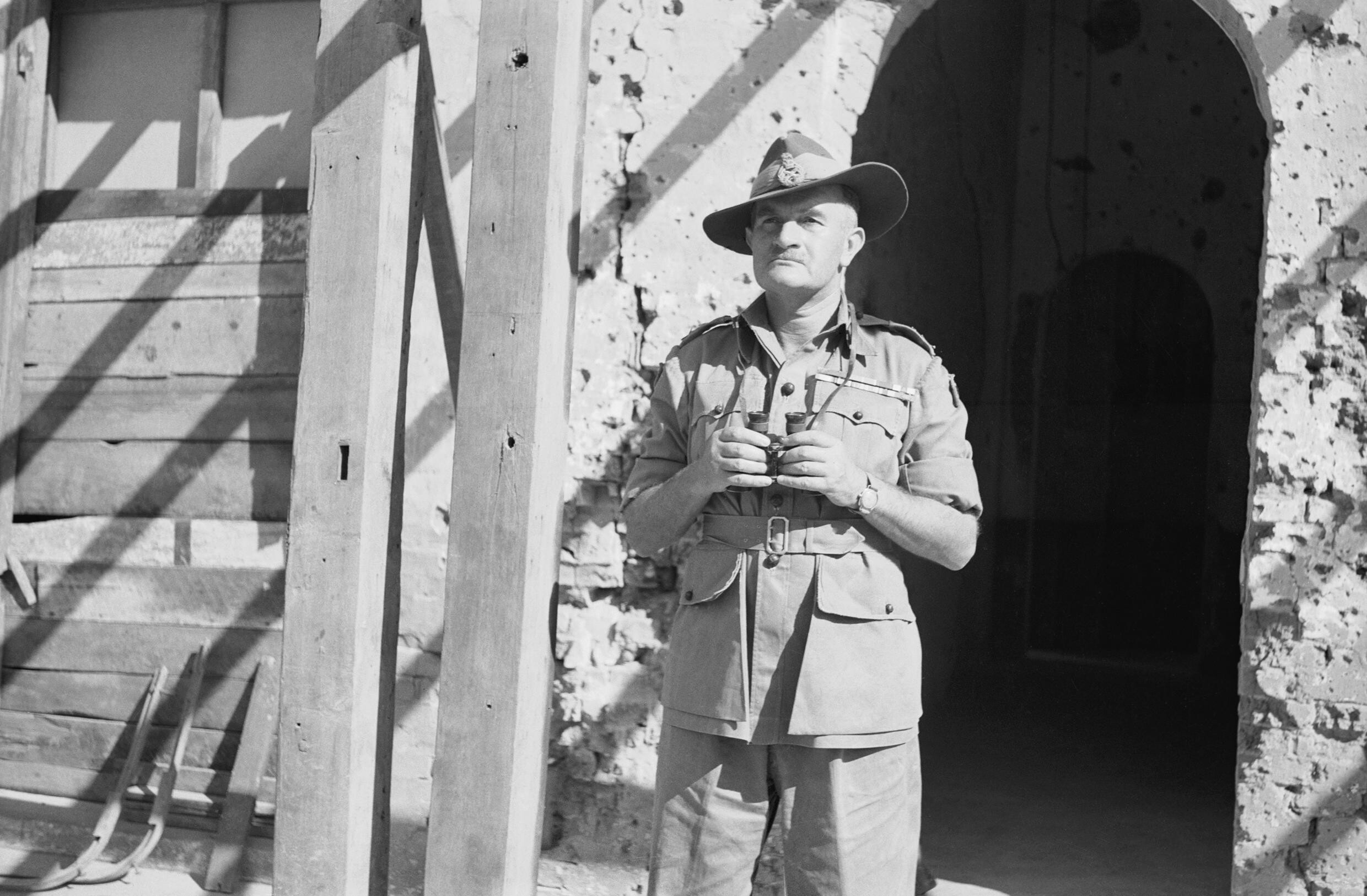
Field Marshal Sir William Slim, General Officer Commanding Fourteenth Army in Burma, 5 March 1945.

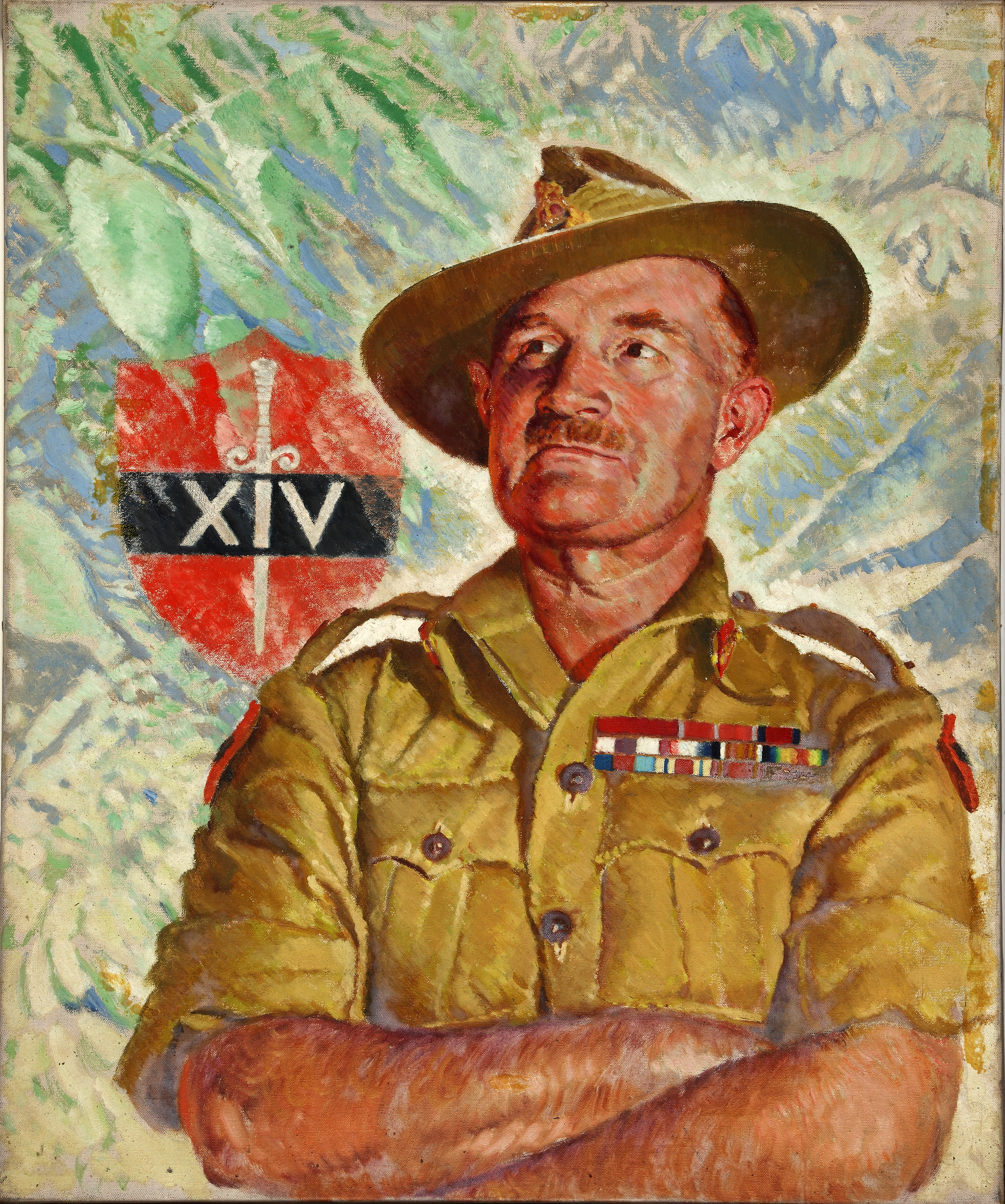
Portrait of General Slim as commander of the Fourteenth Army, commissioned by the Ministry of Information.

In March 1942, Slim was given command of Burma Corps, also known as BurCorps, consisting of the 17th Indian Infantry Division and 1st Burma Division. Slim was made acting lieutenant general on 8 May 1942. The corps was under attack in Burma by the Japanese and, heavily outclassed by the more mobile and flexible Japanese, was soon forced to withdraw to India. On 28 October 1942, Slim was appointed a Commander of the Order of the British Empire (CBE).

Slim then took over XV Corps under the command of the Eastern Army. His command covered the coastal approaches from Burma to India, east of Chittagong. He had a series of disputes with Noel Irwin, commander of Eastern Army and, as a result, Irwin (although an army commander) took personal control of the initial advance by XV Corps into the Arakan Peninsula. The operations ended in disaster, during which Slim was restored to command of XV Corps, albeit too late to salvage the situation. Generals Irwin and Slim blamed each other for the result, but in the end Irwin was removed from his command, and Slim was promoted to command the new Fourteenth Army—formed from IV Corps (United Kingdom) (Imphal), XV Corps (Arakan) and XXXIII Corps (reserve) – later joined by XXXIV Corps. On 14 January 1943, Slim was appointed a Companion of the Distinguished Service Order (DSO) for his actions in the Middle East during 1941. The American historians Alan Millet and Williamson Murray described Slim as:

A hardened field soldier who had learned his trade on the Western Front and in the Indian Army, Slim combined troop-leading and training skills with personal and moral courage as well as charm, a sound grasp of soldiering, and a solid appreciation of Asian warfare and the excellence of the Japanese Army. He had experienced the catastrophe of the 1942 retreat from Burma and the abortive attack on the Arakan. His honesty and character made him the obvious choice to reshape the Fourteenth Army, a force built on the Indian Army but including the ever-dependable Gurkha Rifles of Nepal, unproven infantry battalions from East and West Africa, and infantry battalions and supporting arms from the British Army.

Slim quickly got on with the task of training his new army to take the fight to the enemy. His basic premise was that off-road mobility was paramount: much heavy equipment was exchanged for mule- or air-transported equipment, and motor transport was kept to a minimum and restricted to vehicles that could cope with some of the worst combat terrain on Earth. The new doctrine dictated that if the Japanese had cut the lines of communication, then they too were surrounded. All units were to form defensive 'boxes', to be resupplied by air and assisted by integrated close air support and armour. The boxes were designed as an effective response to the tactics of infiltration practised by the Japanese in the war. Slim also supported increased offensive patrolling and night training, to encourage his soldiers to lose both their fear of the jungle and their belief that Japanese soldiers were better jungle fighters. He also instructed them to hold their positions once outflanked.

The Chin Hills formed a natural defensive barrier into Burma, which Slim would have preferred to outflank by an amphibious operation by landing further down the coast of Burma, but demands of the war in Europe meant the necessary landing craft were not available, forcing Slim to devise plans for advancing into Burma overland through the Chin hills. At the same time, the Japanese 15th Army, which formed the main striking force of the Burma Area Army, had grown from four divisions at the beginning of 1943 to eight divisions by the end of 1943 as the Japanese made preparations for invading India, which increased the difficulties of an overland advance into Burma. By 1943, the Burma Railway, which cost the lives of thousands of prisoners of war who built it, was finished; this allowed the Japanese to reinforce the Burma Area Army, and made invading India possible.

As Slim went about training his men for the rigours of jungle warfare, he clashed with Brigadier Orde Wingate, who took away some of Slim's best Gurkha, British and African units for his Chindit raiding group. Slim argued against the loss of his better units to Wingate, and maintained that though Wingate had a successful career in Palestine and Ethiopia he would discover that the Japanese were a considerably tougher foe than the Palestinians and the Italians that Wingate had hitherto been fighting. However, Slim did approve of Wingate's plans for aid to the hill tribes of Burma. The various hill peoples of Burma such as the Kachins, Karens, Chin, Nagas and the Shan collectively amounted to about 7 million of Burma's 17 million people, and unlike the Bamars, who had welcomed the Japanese as liberators, had stayed loyal to the British when the Japanese invaded. The hill peoples of Burma had suffered under Japanese rule, and were more than willing to wage guerrilla warfare against them. Slim approved of the plans of the SOE and OSS to provide arms and training to the hill tribes as a way to tie down Japanese forces that would otherwise be deployed against him.

At the start of 1944, Slim held the substantive rank of colonel with a war substantive rank of major-general and the acting, then upgraded to temporary, rank of lieutenant-general. In January 1944, when the Second Arakan Offensive was met by a Japanese counter-offensive, the Indian 7th Infantry Division was quickly surrounded along with parts of the Indian 5th Infantry Division and the 81st (West Africa) Division. The 7th Indian Division's defence was based largely on the "Admin Box" formed initially from drivers, cooks and suppliers. They were supplied by air, thus negating the importance of their lost supply lines. The Japanese forces were able to halt the offensive into Arakan but were unable to decisively defeat the allied forces or advance beyond the surrounded formations.

In early 1944, the Japanese Prime Minister, General Hideki Tojo, approved of plans for victory in Asia, calling for two operations, Operation U-Go as the invasion of India was code-named and Operation Ichi-Go which was intended to defeat China once and for all. The two operations in India and China were closely linked given that American supplies for China were flown over "the Hump" of the Himalayas and the Japanese wanted to take the Indian province of Assam in part to close the American air bases in India that sustained China at the same time that they were launching Operation Ichi-Go, the biggest Japanese offensive of all time, involving 2 million men. The Japanese knew that they lacked the logistics to invade India, and the plans for U-Go were based on the assumption that the British Fourteenth Army would just collapse, allowing the Japanese 15th Army to capture enough food to prevent its men from starving to death. Following the Japanese 15th Army into India was the Indian National Army commanded by Subhas Chandra Bose, an ardent nationalist. The Japanese believed that the mere presence of Bose in India would inspire the men of the Indian Army to mutiny and murder their British officers, and set off an anti-British revolution that would allow the Japanese 15th Army to take all of India.

Slim was appointed a Companion of the Order of the Bath (CB) in the 1944 New Year Honours. On 12 March 1944 the Japanese launched an invasion of India aimed at Imphal, hundreds of miles to the north. General Renya Mutaguchi of the Burma Area Army announced the invasion of India was "The March into Delhi" as he expected the invasion to end with him marching in triumph into New Delhi. Slim knew from signals intelligence that the Japanese were going to invade in March 1944, but as Murray and Millet wrote "...he had little choice, but to meet it with the forces on hand – the IV Corps of three Anglo-Indian divisions – or surrender his own plans to take the general offensive into Burma in 1944." Slim chose to fight a defensive campaign to break the Japanese before launching his offensive into Burma, believing that superior British tanks, logistics and air power would allow him to inflict a decisive defeat on Mutaguchi. However, the Japanese advanced more swiftly than Slim had expected up the mud roads of Burma into India, leading to a period of crisis as the fate of India hung in the balance. Slim airlifted two entire veteran divisions (5th and 7th Indian) from battle in the Arakan, straight into battle in the north. Desperate defensive actions were fought at places such as Imphal, Sangshak and Kohima, while the RAF and USAAF kept the forces supplied from the air. Slim ordered his men to hold their ground, forbade any retreat, and informed his men who were surrounded by the Japanese that supplies would be flown in from the air to allow them to hold out. Slim decided to send the IV Corps to relieve Imphal while gambling that the 5th Indian Division could hold out at Kohima, though Slim knew that if Kohima fell, then the Japanese could be able to sever the Assam railroad at Dimapur, which could cut off the British Fourteenth Army from its main supply line. The Battle of Kohima was a fiercely fought battle as Murray and Millet wrote: "Nowhere in World War II – even on the Eastern Front – did the combatants fight with more mindless savagery", but Kohima held. As late as 1 June 1944, Field Marshal Sir Alan Brooke, the Chief of the Imperial General Staff (CIGS), wrote in his diary that he saw "disaster staring us in the face" in Assam, but Slim was more confident, believing he could smash the Japanese attempt to take India. While the Japanese were able to advance and encircle the formations of British Fourteenth Army, they were unable to defeat those same forces or break out of the jungles along the Indian frontier. The Japanese advance stalled. The Japanese, who had a contempt for British and Indian troops based on their performance in 1941–42, refused to give up even after the monsoon started and large parts of their army were wrecked by conducting operations in impossible conditions. The initial Japanese plan was to capture Allied stocks of food, medicine and fuel to sustain their advance, but they failed to capture any stockpiles. As a result, their units took unsupportable casualties and were finally forced to retreat in total disorder in July 1944, leaving behind many dead from hunger and disease as well as their injured. Of the 150,000 Japanese soldiers who invaded India in March 1944, almost all of them were dead by July 1944 as Slim had inflicted the largest defeats that the Japanese had suffered up to this point in the war. The Indian Army remained loyal, and under its British officers fought much better than the Indian National Army. After Imphal and Kohima, the American historian Gerhard Weinberg noted for the Japanese their "... only hope in the area was propaganda by Bose, not much of a substitute for their lost Japanese 15th Army."

Unlike the Japanese, who killed their wounded, Slim went out of his way to ensure good medical care for his wounded and to evacuate his wounded by air to hospitals in India. Slim knew his men would fight better if they knew that they would receive the best possible medical care under the conditions if they were wounded. On 8 August 1944, Slim was promoted to lieutenant general, and, on 28 September 1944, he was appointed a Knight Commander of the Order of the Bath (KCB). In December 1944, during a ceremony at Imphal in front of the Scottish, Gurkha and Punjabi regiments, Slim and three of his corps commanders (Christison, Scoones and Stopford) were knighted by the viceroy Lord Wavell and invested with honours. Slim was presented with his insignia as KCB, and the others with their KBEs. Slim was also mentioned in despatches. By the end of 1944, the majority of the men serving in the British Fourteenth Army were in fact not British as of the 12 divisions that made up the British Fourteenth Army, 2 were British, 7 were Indian and 3 came from Britain's African colonies. In addition, there were six Chinese divisions, two regiments from the U.S. Army and various tribal militias made up of Shan, Chin, Naga, Kachin and Karen peoples raised by the OSS and the SOE fighting on the Allied side in Burma, requiring Slim to play the role of the diplomat as much as a general to hold these disparate forces made up of so many different peoples together.

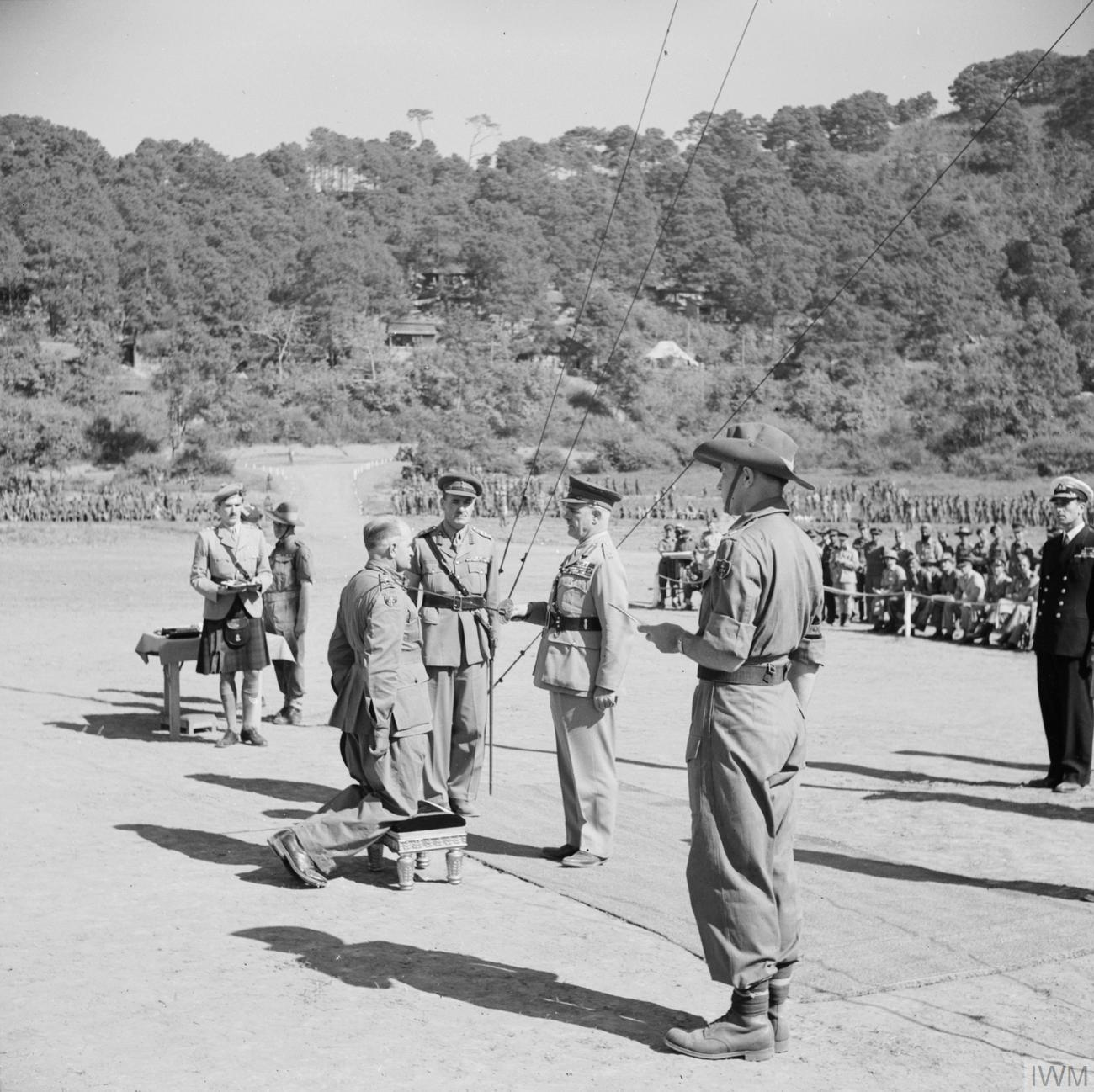
Lieutenant General Sir William Slim being knighted by the Viceroy of India, Field Marshal the Viscount Wavell, near Imphal, December 1944.

In 1945, Slim launched an offensive into Burma, with supply lines stretching almost to the breaking point across hundreds of miles of trackless jungle. Slim employed Billy Williams and his corps of elephants, led by Bandoola, to build bridges and rescue refugees. He faced the same problems that the Japanese had faced in their failed 1944 offensive in the opposite direction. He made the supply of his armies the central issue in the plan of the campaign. The Chindwin River was spanned with the longest Bailey bridge in the world at the time. To distract the Japanese from his campaign in central and southern Burma, Slim ordered the Chinese in northern Burma to begin an offensive, which for a time led the Japanese to the erroneous conclusion that the main goal of the Allies was to open the Burma Road to China. Slim began his advance by sending two corps towards Mandalay and another corps along the coast towards Rangoon, but changed his plans when he learned from intelligence that the Japanese were planning on defending Mandalay from the eastern banks of the Irrawaddy River. Slim had one corps cross the Irrawaddy south of Mandalay at Meiktila while another corps staged a feint attack on Mandalay from the north to distract the Japanese from the main blow coming up from the south. The swift flowing Irrawaddy is a wider river than the Rhine, making it into a natural defensive barrier that the Japanese believed could halt the British advance. However, much of the countryside around the Irrawaddy consists of plains that favoured the offensive, and in his operations in the Irrawaddy river valley, Slim used combined arms offensives with artillery and tanks working closely with the infantry to bring down overwhelming firepower when the Japanese tried to block the British Fourteenth Army's advance. In March 1945, after crossing the Irrawaddy, the town of Meiktila was taken, followed by Burma's second city, Mandalay.

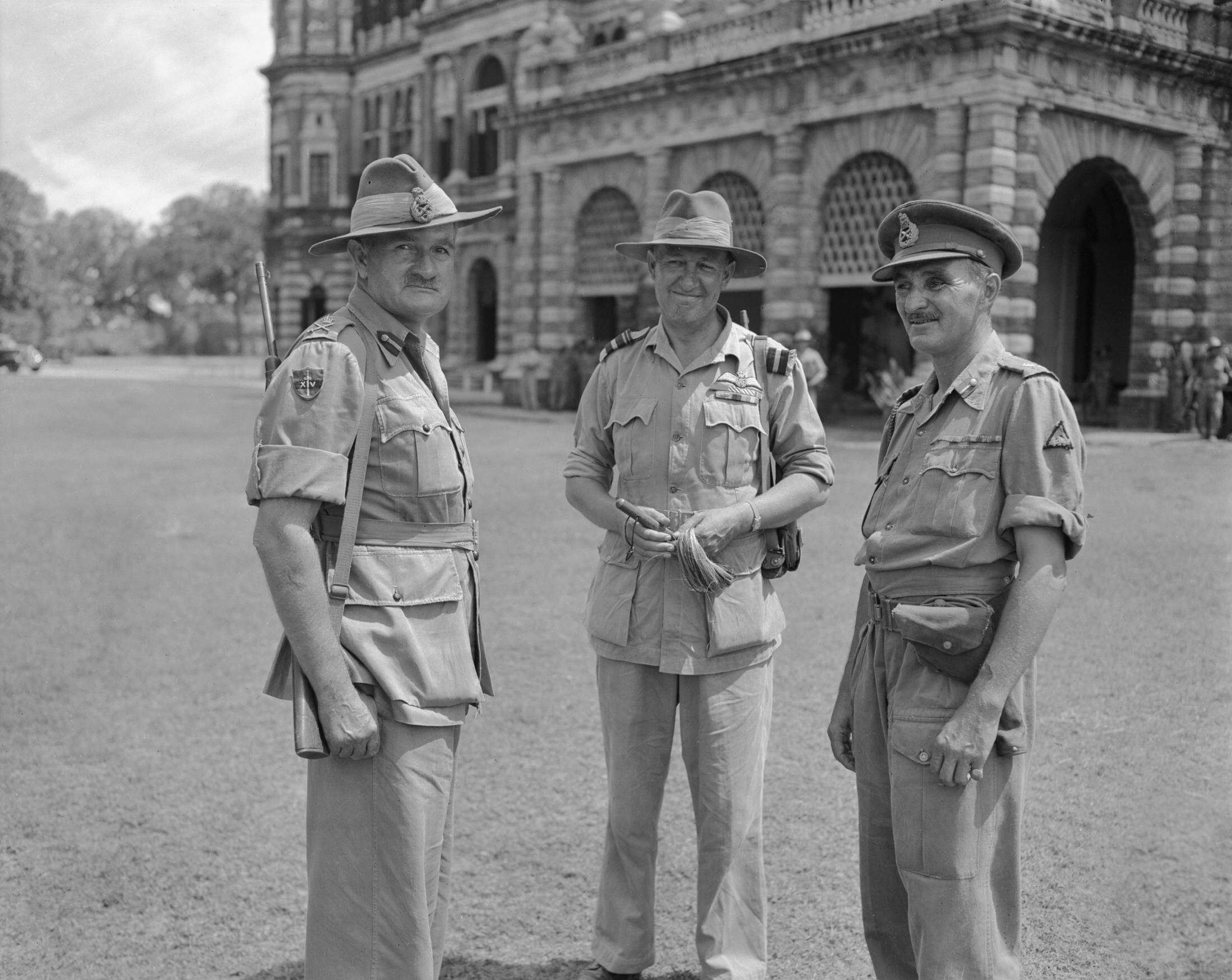
Lieutenant General Sir William Slim (GOC Fourteenth Army, left), Air Vice Marshal Stanley Vincent (AOC 221 Group South East Asia Air Forces, centre) and Major General Henry Chambers (GOC 26th Indian Division, right) at Government House, Rangoon, 8 May 1945.

The Japanese garrison in Mandalay chose not to surrender, using the forts built by the British and the maze of pagodas in downtown Mandalay to fight to the death in an urban battle that destroyed much of the city, which finally fell to the British Fourteenth Army on 20 March 1945. Slim's plan was a masterpiece of operational art, and the capture of Meiktila left most of Japan's troops stranded in Burma without supplies. The Allies had reached the open plains of central Burma, sallying out and breaking Japanese attacking forces in isolation, maintaining the initiative at all times, backed up by air-land cooperation, including resupply by air and close air support, performed by both RAF and USAAF units. Slim followed up this victory by ordering his coastal corps to seize the mouth of the Irrawaddy where it flowed into the Bay of Bengal.

In combination with these attacks, Force 136 helped initiate a countrywide uprising of the Bamar people against the Japanese. In addition to fighting the allied advance south, the Japanese were faced with heavy attacks from behind their own lines. As he advanced into Burma, Slim discovered gruesome evidence of the nature of Japanese rule in Burma, finding in village after village, Burmese peasants who had been tied to trees and bayoneted to death as the Japanese preferred bayonet practice with people rather than sandbags as normally is the case. Toward the end of the campaign, the army raced south to capture Rangoon before the start of the monsoon. It was considered necessary to capture the port because of the length of the supply lines overland from India and the impossibility of supply by air or land during the monsoon. Rangoon was eventually taken by a combined attack from the land (Slim's army), the air (parachute operations south of the city) and a seaborne invasion. Also assisting in the capture of Rangoon was the Anti-Fascist People's Freedom League led by Thakin Soe, with Aung San (the future Prime Minister of Burma and father of Aung San Suu Kyi) as one of its military commanders.

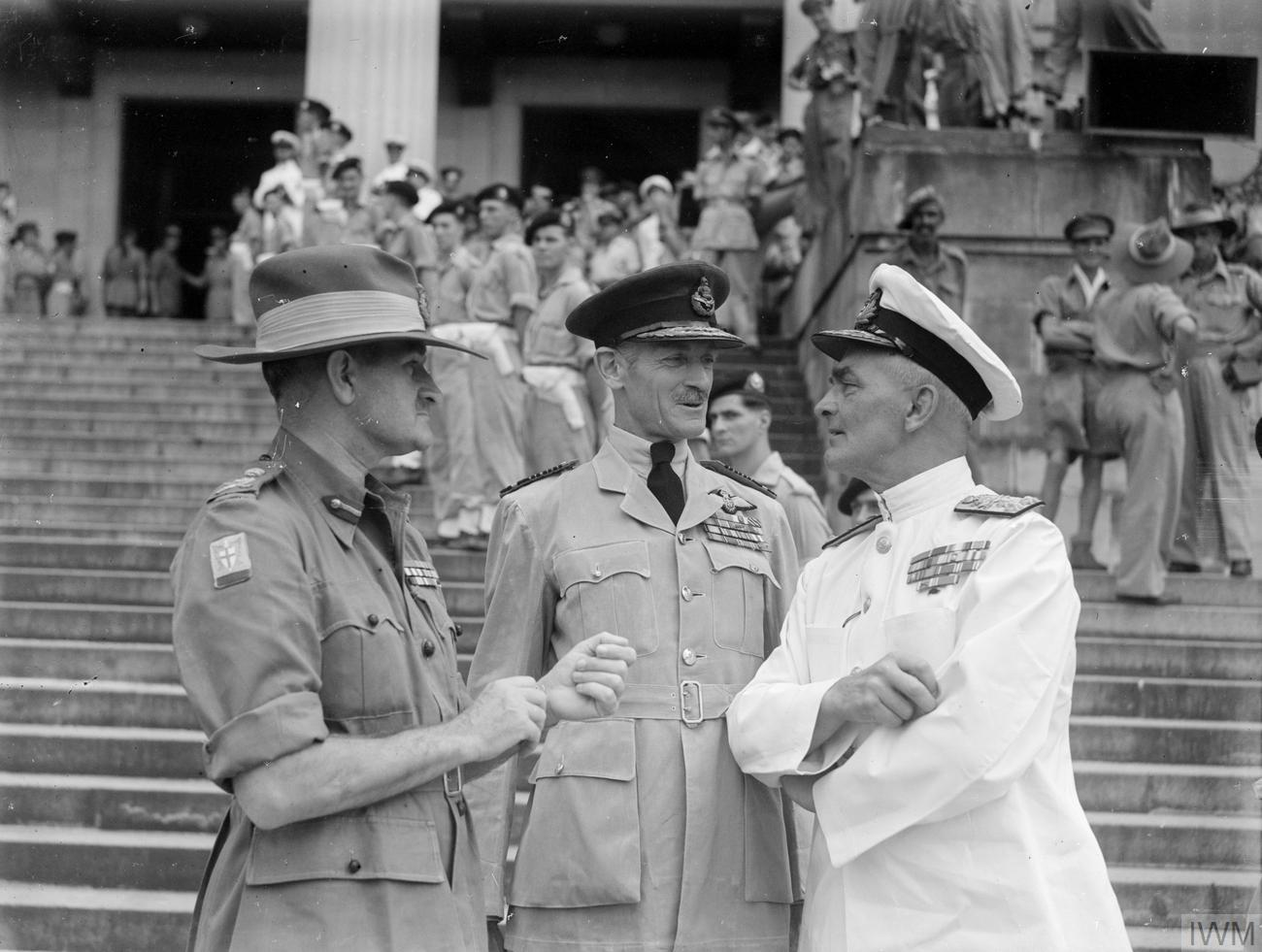
Slim with Air Marshal Sir Keith Park and Vice-Admiral Sir Arthur John Power outside Singapore's municipal building, following Japan's ceremonial surrender of the city, 12 September 1945.

As the Burma campaign came to an end, Slim was informed in May by Oliver Leese, the commander of Allied Land Forces South-East Asia (ALFSEA) that he would not be commanding Fourteenth Army in the forthcoming invasion planned for Malaya but would take command of the new Twelfth Army being formed to mop up in Burma. Slim refused the appointment, saying he would prefer to retire. As the news spread, Fourteenth Army fell into turmoil and Alan Brooke, the Chief of the Imperial General Staff, furious at not having been consulted by Leese, and Claude Auchinleck, the C-in-C India who was at the time in London, brought pressure to bear. The Supreme Allied Commander of the Southeast Asia Theatre, Louis Mountbatten was obliged to order Leese to undo the damage. On 1 July 1945, Slim was promoted to general and was informed that he was to succeed Leese as C-in-C ALFSEA. However, by the time he took up the post, having taken some leave, the war was at an end.

==== Relations with troops ====
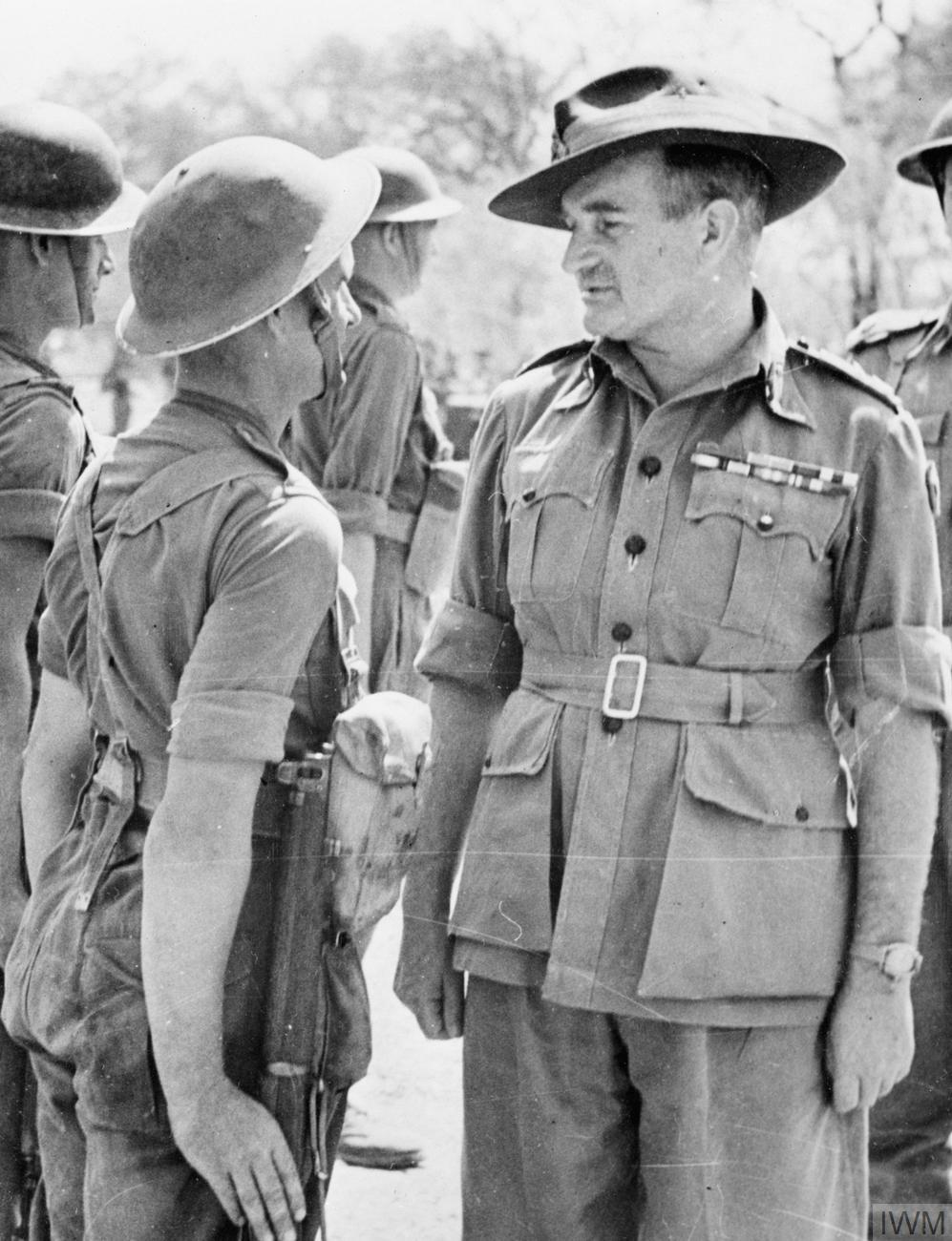
Slim with a soldier. Photo from No 9 Army Film & Photographic Unit.

Slim had an excellent relationship with his troops – the "Forgotten Army", as they called themselves. Slim had a close rapport with the officers and soldiers under his command, and always trusted his officers to make the correct decisions without referring to him. As Slim later wrote: "I was, like other generals before me, to be saved ... by the resourcefulness and the stubborn valour of my troops." Murray and Millet wrote that Slim's willingness to delegate authority down to his officers on the spot played a key role in sustaining his advance into Burma as officers did not have to wait for a decision from him.

In the aftermath of Kohima and Imphal, Slim inspected the battlefields, seeing the bodies of wounded Japanese soldiers who had been killed by their comrades as under the code of Bushido, which graphically showed to Slim how far the Japanese were willing to take Bushido. Slim realized that Japanese logistics had broken down, but that Japanese soldiers were still prepared to fight to the death. That led him to the conclusion that it was better to outflank and bypass the Japanese positions as much as possible, leaving the Japanese to starve to death rather than engaging them in combat. The Japanese Burma Area Army had about 100,000 men while the British Fourteenth Army had only about 21,000 men. But Slim believed that with superior mobility backed by proper supply line, he could defeat the Japanese, whose logistics were poor. The superior Japanese numbers together with the fact that the Indian Army was an all-volunteer force, with only so many Indians willing to volunteer and the fact that sending fresh British troops to Burma was not a priority in London, made it imperative for Slim to save the lives of his men as much as possible. Slim was painfully aware that it would be difficult to replace whatever losses his men took, and had no intention of having his army being ground down by fighting the Japanese in every single place that they were. Slim was determined to save the lives of his men as much as possible, while Japanese officers, motivated by Bushido, were ready to have all of their men die for the Emperor. Slim estimated that for every man killed under his command, the Japanese lost a hundred men.

Slim noted 70% malaria rates among his troops, largely because they refused to take foul-tasting mepacrine. Slim did not blame his medics for this problem, but placed the responsibility on his officers. He wrote: "Good doctors are no use without good discipline. More than half the battle against disease is fought not by the doctors, but by the regimental officers." After Slim dismissed some officers for high unit malaria rates, the others realised he was serious and malaria treatment was enforced, dropping the rate to less than five per cent. The combat effectiveness of his army was thus greatly enhanced. This physical and mental turnaround in the army under him was a contributing factor to the eventual defeat of the Japanese in Burma.

Novelist George MacDonald Fraser, then a nineteen-year-old lance corporal, recalled:

But the biggest boost to morale was the burly man who came to talk to the assembled battalion... it was unforgettable. Slim was like that: the only man I've ever seen who had a force that came out of him... British soldiers don't love their commanders much less worship them; Fourteenth Army trusted Slim and thought of him as one of themselves, and perhaps his real secret was that the feeling was mutual.

and:

...I see him clear, with that robber-baron face under that Gurkha hat, and his carbine slung, looking like a rather scruffy private with a general's tabs, which of course is what he was.

== Post-war career ==
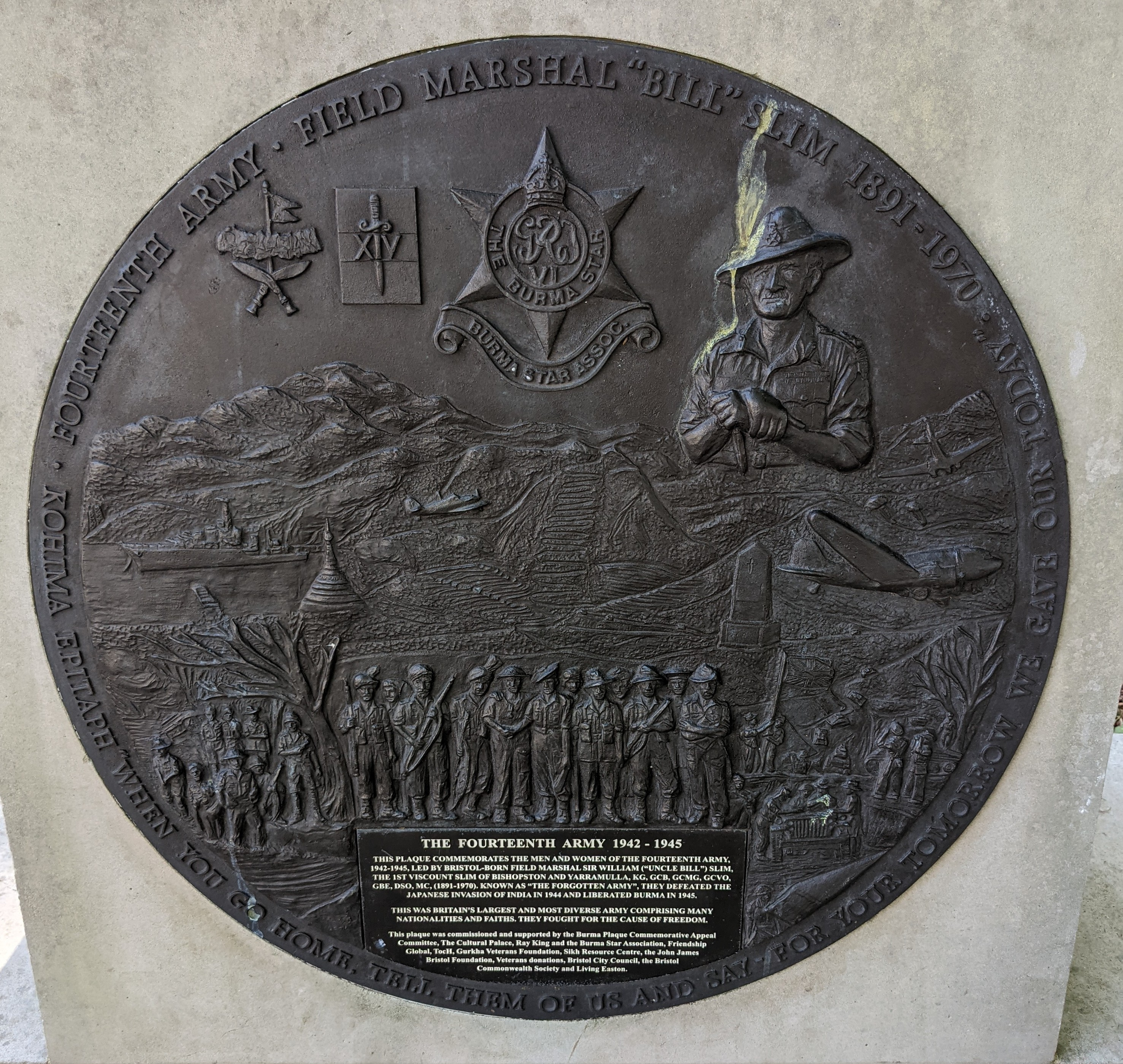
Plaque commemorating Slim and the 14th Army in Bristol

=== Initial retirement from the army ===
At the end of 1945 Slim returned to the UK. On 1 January 1946, he was made a Knight Grand Cross of the Order of the British Empire (GBE). and took the post of Commandant of the Imperial Defence College for its first course since 1939. On 7 February 1947 he was made an Aide-de-camp (ADC) to the King. At the end of his two-year appointment at the Imperial Defence College Slim retired as ADC and from the army on 11 May 1948. He had been approached by both India and Pakistan to become C-in-C of their respective armies post independence but refused and instead became Deputy Chairman of the Railway Executive.

=== Return to the army ===
However, in November 1948, British Prime Minister Clement Attlee rejected the proposal by Viscount Montgomery that he should be succeeded as Chief of the Imperial General Staff (CIGS) by John Crocker and instead brought back Slim from retirement in the rank of field marshal in January 1949 with formal appointment to the Army Council from 1 January 1949. Slim thus became the first Indian Army officer to become CIGS.

On 2 January 1950, Slim was promoted to Knight Grand Cross of the Order of the Bath (GCB) and later that year was made a Chief Commander of the Legion of Merit by the United States having previously, in 1948, been awarded the lower ranking Commander of the Legion of Merit. On 1 November 1952, he relinquished the position of Chief of the Imperial General Staff.

=== Governor-General of Australia ===
On 10 December 1952 Slim was made a Knight Grand Cross of the Order of St Michael and St George (GCMG) on his appointment as Governor-General of Australia which post he took up on 8 May 1953. On 2 January 1953, he was appointed a Knight of the Order of St. John (KStJ). Slim was a popular choice for Governor-General since he was an authentic war hero who had fought alongside Australians at Gallipoli and in the Middle East. In 1954 he was able to welcome Queen Elizabeth II on the first visit by a reigning monarch to Australia. For his services to the Queen during the tour, he was appointed a Knight Grand Cross of the Royal Victorian Order (GCVO) on 27 April 1954. Liberal leader Robert Menzies held office throughout Slim's time in Australia. His Official Secretary throughout his term was Murray Tyrrell.

=== Retirement ===
In 1959, Slim retired and returned to Britain, where he published his memoirs, Unofficial History. He had already published his personal narrative of the Burma Campaign, Defeat into Victory, in 1956, which has never been out of print, and in which he candidly talked about his mistakes and the lessons he learned. On 24 April 1959, he was appointed a Knight Companion of the Order of the Garter (KG). On 15 July 1960, he was created "Viscount Slim, of Yarralumla in the Capital Territory of Australia and of Bishopston in the City and County of Bristol".

After a successful further career on the boards of major UK companies, he was appointed Constable and Governor of Windsor Castle on 18 June 1964. He died in London on 14 December 1970, aged 79 and was given a full military funeral at St. George's Chapel, Windsor and was afterwards cremated.

== Allegations ==
During his tenure as Governor-General of Australia, Slim was patron of the Fairbridge Farm school child migration to Australia. In 2007 (37 years after Slim's death), three former child migrants alleged that Slim assaulted them during visits to Fairbridge Farm. The allegations were denied by his son. The allegations were aired again on ABC television in the programme The Long Journey Home, broadcast on 17 November 2009. On 27 February 2017, the ABC again aired allegations against Slim and Fairbridge Farm.

Somehow or another, I was sat on his [Slim's] knee and, ah..... um..... these silky white hands were right up, because I was wearing shorts, right up my trousers and yeah, it was not..... not very nice.

— Robert Stephens' claims of a drive in Governor-General Slim's car, 2017

In 2019, a major road in Canberra was renamed due to the allegations.

In 2023, a fourth man said he witnessed Slim abusing a child.

== Eponyms ==
- William Slim Drive, in the Canberra district of Belconnen, was named after him. Despite an independent review commissioned by the Australian Capital Territory Government, which returned no recommendation to change the road name, in 2019, the then ACT Planning Minister Mick Gentleman, announced that, after considering allegations made, submissions to the Royal Commission into Institutional Responses to Child Sexual Abuse and counter submissions by the Slim family, he would change the road's name and in 2021 the name was changed.
- The Slim Officers' Mess at the Royal Military Academy Sandhurst is named after him and was opened in August 2004 by his son.
- On 7 September 2008, a plaque in Slim's memory, and those who served with him, was unveiled at the Cenotaph in his native Bristol. Fr Robert King of the Diocese of Clifton was joined by faith leaders from the Hindu, Muslim and Sikh communities at the ceremony, which was led by the Lord Mayor of Bristol's chaplain, the Rev. Prebendary Harold Clarke.
- The road Viscount Slim Avenue, in Whyalla, South Australia is named after him.
- The Slim Building at the Cranfield University Shrivenham Campus is named after him.
- The Slim School was a British Families Education Service co-educational secondary school located in the Cameron Highlands, Malaya, and was named after him.

== Historical assessment ==
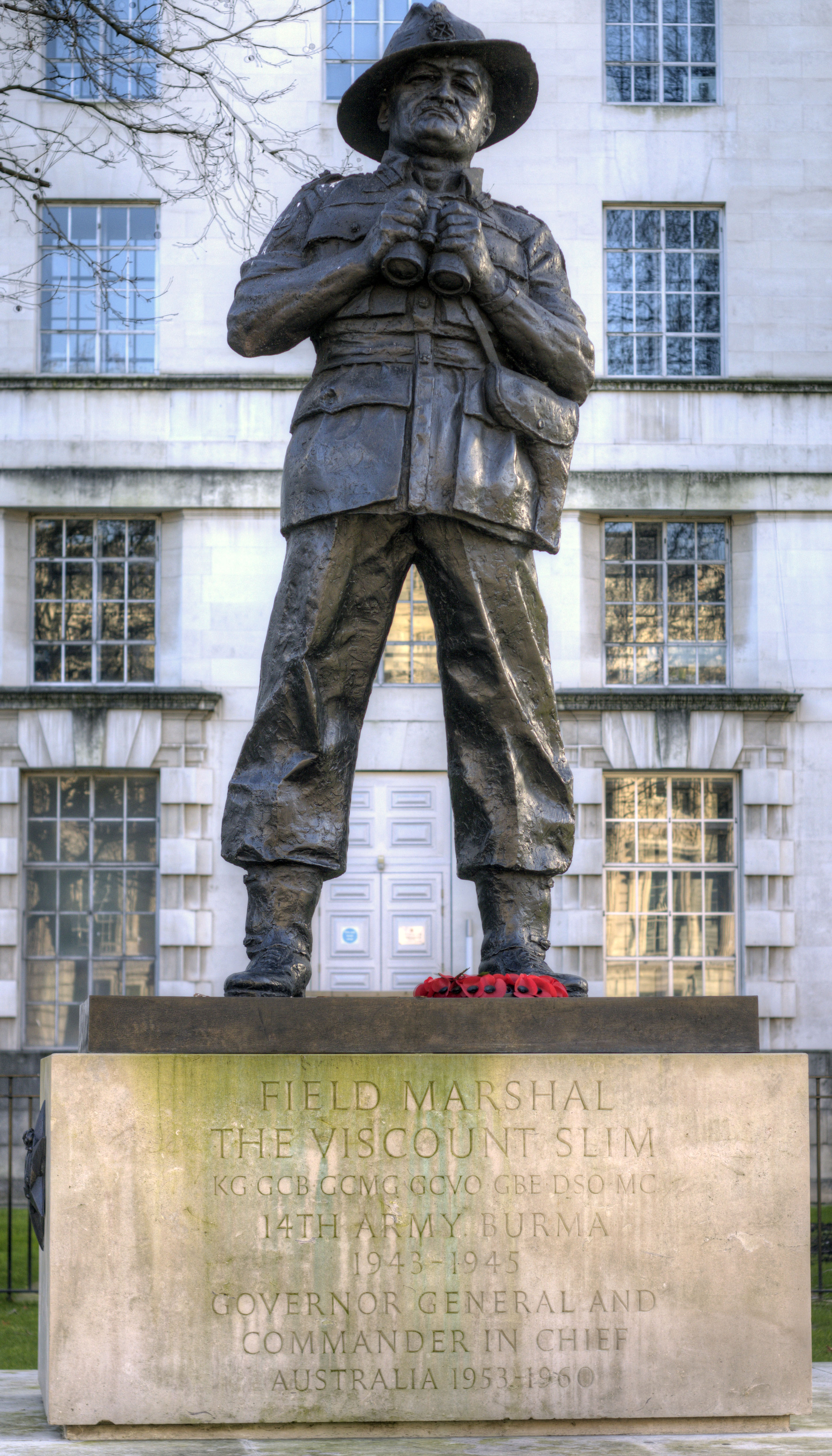
Statue of General Slim on Whitehall.

Lieutenant General Sir John Kiszely has recommended Slim's memoirs (Defeat into Victory, 1956) in which Slim candidly talked about his own mistakes in the Burma campaign. The book has never been out of print. Kiszely has described Slim as "perhaps the Greatest Commander of the 20th Century" and has commented on Slim's "self-deprecating style". The military historian Max Hastings has stated:

In contrast to almost every other outstanding commander of the war, Slim was a disarmingly normal human being, possessed of notable self-knowledge. He was without pretension, devoted to his wife, Aileen, their family and the Indian Army. His calm, robust style of leadership and concern for the interests of his men won the admiration of all who served under him ... His blunt honesty, lack of bombast and unwillingness to play courtier did him few favours in the corridors of power. Only his soldiers never wavered in their devotion.

The spirit of comradeship Slim created within the Fourteenth Army lived on after the war in the Burma Star Association, of which Slim was a co-founder and the first President.

A statue of Slim on Whitehall, outside the Ministry of Defence, was unveiled by Queen Elizabeth II in 1990. Designed by Ivor Roberts-Jones, the statue is one of three British Second World War military leaders (the others being Alan Brooke and Bernard Montgomery).

Slim's papers were collected by his biographer, Ronald Lewin, and given to the Churchill Archives Centre by Slim's wife, Aileen, Viscountess Slim, and son, John Slim, 2nd Viscount Slim, and other donors, 1977–2001. Lewin's biography, Slim: The Standardbearer, was awarded the 1977 WH Smith Literary Award.

== Arms ==
Coat of arms of William Slim, 1st Viscount Slim
Coronet A Coronet of a Viscount Crest Out of a Crown Vallary Or a Peacock in its Pride proper gorged with a Collar and with a Line reflexed over the back Or Escutcheon Gules semy of Swords erect Argent a Lion rampant Or on a Canton quarterly Azure and also Argent a Mullet of seven points Or Supporters Dexter: a British Soldier in jungle green Battle Dress with web equipment the exterior hand supporting a Rifle with bayonet affixed; Sinister: a Gurkha Rifleman in North West Frontier dress with web equipment the exterior hand supporting a Rifle all proper Motto Merses Profundo Pulchrior Evenit (A recompense is fairer from a depth)

== List of honours ==
Knight Companion of the Order of the Garter (KG)	24 April 1959
Knight Grand Cross of the Order of the Bath (GCB)	2 January 1950
Knight Commander of the Order of the Bath (KCB)	28 September 1944
Companion of the Order of the Bath (CB)	1 January 1944
Knight Grand Cross of the Order of St Michael and St George (GCMG)	10 December 1952
Knight Grand Cross of the Royal Victorian Order (GCVO)	16 February 1954
Knight Grand Cross of the Order of the British Empire (GBE)	1 January 1946
Commander of the Order of the British Empire (CBE)	28 October 1942
Knight of the Order of St John	2 January 1953
Companion of the Distinguished Service Order (DSO)	14 January 1943
Military Cross (MC)	7 February 1918
Chief Commander of the Legion of Merit	(United States)

== Bibliography ==
- Defeat into Victory by Field Marshal Sir William Slim; Originally published 1956. More recent editions are NY: Buccaneer Books ISBN 1-56849-077-1, Cooper Square Press ISBN 0-8154-1022-0; London: Cassell ISBN 0-304-29114-5, Pan ISBN 0-330-39066-X.
- Other publications include Courage and Other Broadcasts (1957); and Unofficial History (1959).

== Footnotes ==
Military offices
Preceded by Daril Watson	Commandant of the Senior Officers' School, Belgaum; June–September 1939	School closed for the war
Preceded by H.R.C. Lane	Commander, 10th Indian Infantry Brigade; 1939–1941	Succeeded by Thomas Rees
Preceded by William Fraser	GOC 10th Indian Infantry Division; 1941–1942	Succeeded by Thomas Rees
Preceded by Noel Beresford-Peirse	GOC XV Indian Corps; 1942–1943	Succeeded by Philip Christison
New title	GOC Fourteenth Army; 1943–1945	Succeeded by Sir Miles Dempsey
Vacant Second World War Title last held by Hugh Binney	Commandant of the Imperial Defence College; 1946–1948	Succeeded by Sir John Slessor
Preceded by The Viscount Montgomery of Alamein	Chief of the Imperial General Staff; 1948–1952	Succeeded by Sir John Harding
Government offices
Preceded by Sir William McKell	Governor-General of Australia; 1953–1960	Succeeded by The Viscount Dunrossil
Honorary titles
Vacant Title last held by The Earl of Athlone	Constable and Governor of Windsor Castle; 1964–1970	Succeeded by The Lord Elworthy
Peerage of the United Kingdom
New creation	Viscount Slim; 1960–1970	Succeeded by John Douglas Slim
