= Burma Star Association =

British veterans' association

The Burma Star Association is a British veterans' association for ex-servicemen and women of all services who served in the Burma Campaign of World War II. The criterion for membership is the award of the Burma Star for service in Burma during World War II for the necessary qualifying period or the Pacific Star with Burma Clasp.

The association was formed on 26 February 1951 to promote comradeship and the welfare of its members. The arduous nature of the Burma Campaign has been recognised and permission granted to the members to wear a replica of the Burma Star in a lapel badge and cap badge.

The association's patron was Prince Philip, the Duke of Edinburgh and its president was John Slim, 2nd Viscount Slim, the son of Bill Slim, who commanded the 14th Army in Burma.

On 1 April 2020 the Burma Star Association merged with the Burma Star Memorial Fund, which took over the work of the association and set up a scholarship scheme in honour of "Burma Star veterans".
