= Slim School =

The Slim School was a British Families Education Service co-educational secondary school located in the Cameron Highlands, Malaya. Established in 1951 and named after Field Marshal Lord Slim, it educated children of British military families from the ages of 11 to 17. It closed in December 1964. Its founding headmaster was Major (later Lieutenant Colonel) William Harrison.
