= John Slim, 2nd Viscount Slim =

British peer, soldier and businessman (1927–2019)

Colonel The Right Honourable The Viscount Slim OBE, DL, FRGS
- Slim in the Lords chamber, 2017

Member of the House of Lords
- Lord Temporal
- Hereditary peerage 1 April 1971 – 11 November 1999
- Preceded by: The 1st Viscount Slim
- Succeeded by: Seat abolished
- Elected Hereditary Peer; 11 November 1999 – 12 January 2019
- Election: 1999
- Preceded by: Seat established
- Succeeded by: The 4th Baron Ravensdale

Personal details
- Born: John Douglas Slim; 20 July 1927 Quetta, British India
- Died: 12 January 2019 (aged 91)
- Spouse: Elisabeth Spinney (m. 1958; died 2018)
- Children: Mark, Hugo, Mary Ann
- Parent(s): William Slim, 1st Viscount Slim; Aileen Robertson

Military service
- Allegiance: United Kingdom
- Branch/service: British Army
- Years of service: 1944–1972
- Rank: Colonel
- Commands: 22 Special Air Service Regiment
- Battles/wars: Second World War; Korean War; Malayan Emergency; Indonesia–Malaysia confrontation
- Awards: Officer of the Order of the British Empire

Colonel John Douglas Slim, 2nd Viscount Slim (20 July 1927 – 12 January 2019), was a British peer, soldier and businessman. He was one of the 92 elected hereditary peers in the House of Lords, elected to remain after the passing of the House of Lords Act 1999. In 1970, he succeeded to his father's title. He sat as a crossbencher.

== Life and work ==
The son of Aileen (née Robertson) and William Slim (later 1st Viscount Slim), he was born in Quetta in British India and was educated at Prince of Wales Royal Indian Military College in Dehradun. In 1944, Slim joined the 6th Gurkha Rifles of the British Indian Army and was later transferred to the Argyll and Sutherland Highlanders in 1948. He entered the Special Air Service in 1952 in Malaya, where he was involved in developing pioneering techniques of jungle warfare. He is personally thanked in the author's note at the start of Dennis Holman's 1958 jungle warfare classic, Noone of the Ulu. From 1961, he was instructor at the Staff College, Camberley, and from 1964 at the Joint Services Staff College. He commanded an SAS squadron during the Indonesian Confrontation. In 1967 he became CO of 22 SAS, where he helped to develop its counter-terrorist capabilities, before handing over to John Watts in 1969. In 1972, he retired from the armed forces at the rank of lieutenant colonel with a later honorary promotion to colonel. He was appointed an Officer of the Order of the British Empire the following year.

Slim was chairman of Peek plc from 1976 to 1991, deputy chairman from 1991 to 1996, and eventually consultant from 1996 to 2003. He was further director of Trailfinders travel company and Trustee of the Royal Commonwealth Ex-Services League (RCEL). From 1971 until his death he was president of the Burma Star Association and from 2000 president of the SAS Association. He was also Patron of Prospect Burma, a London-based charity that offers higher education scholarships to Burmese students as well as the Graham Layton Trust, a British charity which helps to raise money for eyecare in Pakistan.

From 2005 to 2016 Slim was Patron of the Burma Children's Fund a UK Charity supporting children's education and health care in Burma. Having been chairman in the past, he was vice-president of the Britain–Australia Society. From 1977 to 1996, he was vice-chairman of the Arab British Chamber of Commerce. In 1983, Slim was made a Fellow of the Royal Geographical Society. Between 1995 and 1996, he was also Master of the Worshipful Company of Clothworkers. He served as an honorary chairman of the OSS Society.

Slim was married to cordon bleu chef Elisabeth Spinney from 1958 until her death in 2018. They had two sons, Mark William Rawdon Slim (born 1960) and Hugo John Robertson Slim (born 1961), and a daughter, Mary Ann Elisabeth Slim (born 1964). He was appointed as a Deputy Lieutenant of Greater London on 1 March 1988. This gave him the post-nominal letters "DL" for life. He was moved to the retired list upon reaching the age of 75 in 2002.

Slim died on 12 January 2019, aged 91.

== Arms ==
Coat of arms of John Slim, 2nd Viscount Slim
Coronet A Coronet of a Viscount Crest Out of a Crown Vallary Or a Peacock in its Pride proper gorged with a Collar and with a Line reflexed over the back Or Escutcheon Gules semy of Swords erect Argent a Lion rampant Or on a Canton quarterly Azure and also Argent a Mullet of seven points Gold Supporters Dexter: a British Soldier in jungle green Battle Dress with web equipment the exterior hand supporting a Rifle with bayonet affixed; Sinister: a Gurkha Rifleman in North West Frontier dress with web equipment the exterior hand supporting a Rifle all proper Motto Merses Profundo Pulchrior Evenit (A recompense is fairer from a depth)

== Notes ==
Peerage of the United Kingdom
Preceded by William Slim	Viscount Slim; 1970–2019; Member of the House of Lords (1971–1999)	Succeeded by Mark Slim
Parliament of the United Kingdom
New office created by the House of Lords Act 1999	Elected hereditary peer to the House of Lords under the House of Lords Act 1999; 1999–2019	Succeeded by The Lord Ravensdale
