= Slim Dziri =

Tunisian politician

- Born: 5 August 1875; Tunis, Tunisia
- Died: 18 November 1953 (aged 78); Le Bardo
- Military career
- Allegiance: Tunisia
- Branch: Tunisian Army
- Rank: Major General
- Awards: Légion d'honneur Order of Saint Louis

Le General Slim Dziri, also known as Slim Jaziri, (5 August 1875 in Tunis – 18 November 1953 in Le Bardo) was a Tunisian Minister Plenipotentiary from 1929 to 1935.

He was Minister Plenipotentiary, Major General, Chief of the Tunisian Government Protocol, president of Ahmed Bey's II Administration and prefect of Beylical residence.

== Biography ==
Before being appointed in 1899 Chief Officer of various contributions to Jemmal (Tunisian Sahel) and in Sfax, he was Financial Services Officer. Then, becomes in 1903, public works officer. Some time after he became interpreter for topographic public works. It was through his experience, his honesty and loyalty in their relationship he was able to occupy positions of high-ranking importance in Tunisia public administration. Here soon, the Bey appointed him his private secretary and civil list director.

Husseinite family member, he became governor's legal all the princes and princesses of family's Bey. He eventually became president of Ahmed II bey's private administration of on March 21, 1929. Then he was appointed Commander of the Ordre National de la Legion d'Honneur, by the decree of July 7, 1934 (France). He was then promoted to Interior Director and Head of palaces and protocol by decree of July 29, 1935 (Tunisia).

== Bibliography ==
- Slim Dziri, Archives Nationales Tunisiennes - 1940, Tunisie-Protectorat, carton1 à 20, Tunis, 1940
- Les Beys de Tunis, 1705-1957 : Hérédité, souveraineté, généalogie, Éd. El Mokhtar Bey, Tunis, (2003)
