= Slim Jim =

Slim Jim may refer to:

== Items ==
- Slim Jim (snack food), a brand of beef snack made by Conagra Brands
- Slim Jim (antenna), a type of dipole radio antenna
- Slim jim (lock pick), a tool for bypassing car locks
- nickname for the narrow-body version of the British Rail Class 33 locomotive
- nickname of the GM Roto Hydramatic transmission
- a sandwich on the menu of Big Boy Restaurants
- a sandwich on the menu of Shoney's Restaurants
- a narrow necktie, favored in the Teddy Boy British subculture

== Nickname or stage name ==
- Slim Jim Phantom, stage name of James McDonnell (born 1961), drummer for the rockabilly group the Stray Cats
- Jim Baxter (1939–2001), Scottish footballer
- Howard Earl (1869–1916), American Major League Baseball player
- W. E. Foster, late 19th and early 20th century con man – see Shootout on Juneau Wharf
- James M. Gavin (1907–1990), US Army lieutenant general in World War II and US Ambassador to France
- Ernest Iverson (1903–1958), American radio personality

== Entertainment ==
- Slim Jim, a character in the 1960 UK puppet television series Four Feather Falls
- "Slim Jim", a 1964 episode of the UK television series Dixon of Dock Green
- "Slim Jim", a track on the 1967 album A Bag Full of Blues by American jazz organist Jimmy McGriff
- Slim Jim, a playable character in the 1994 video game Road Rash

== Other uses ==
- Slim Jim All Pro Series, former name of the NASCAR AutoZone Elite Division, Southeast Series.
