= Pacific War =

Theater of World War II

- Part of World War II
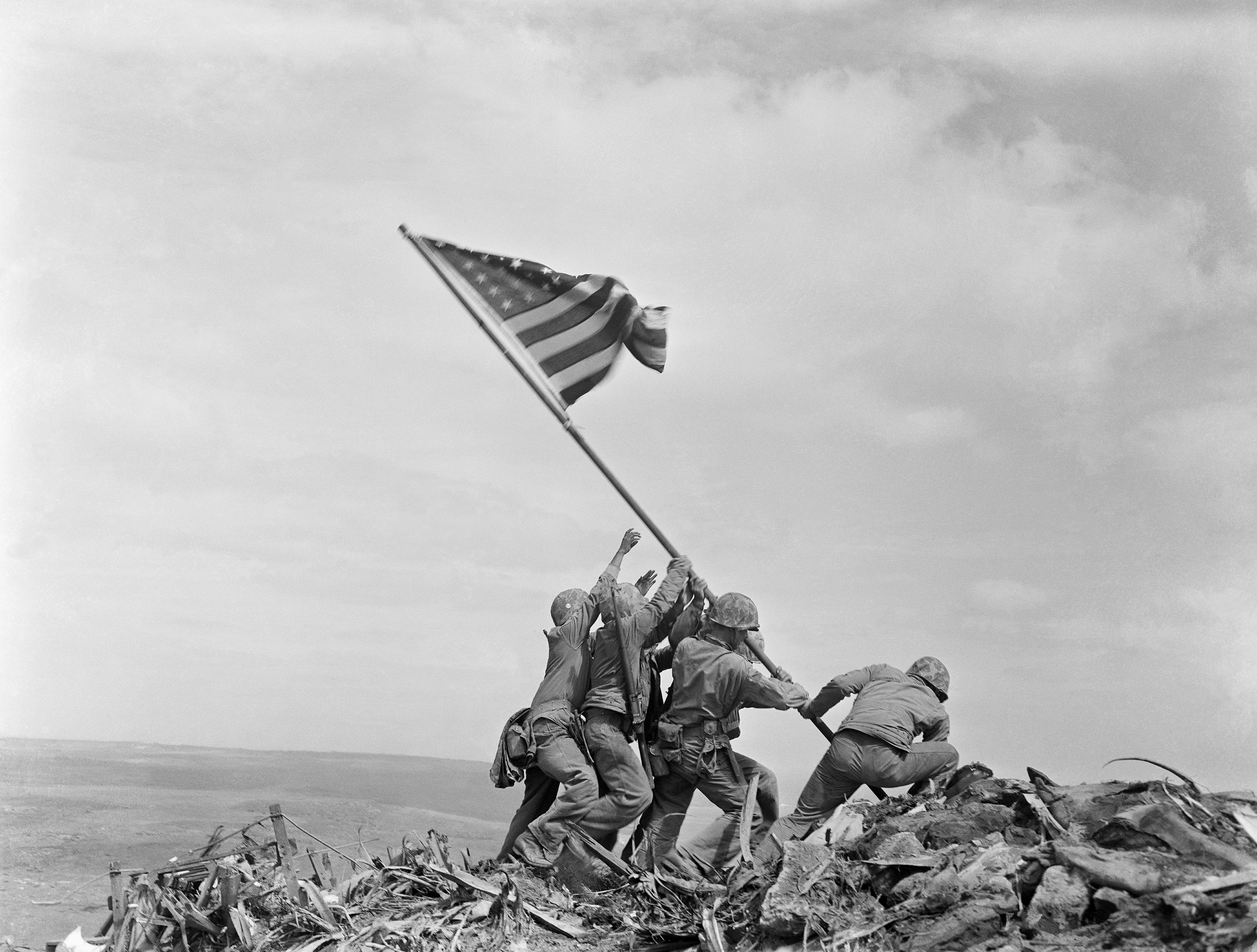
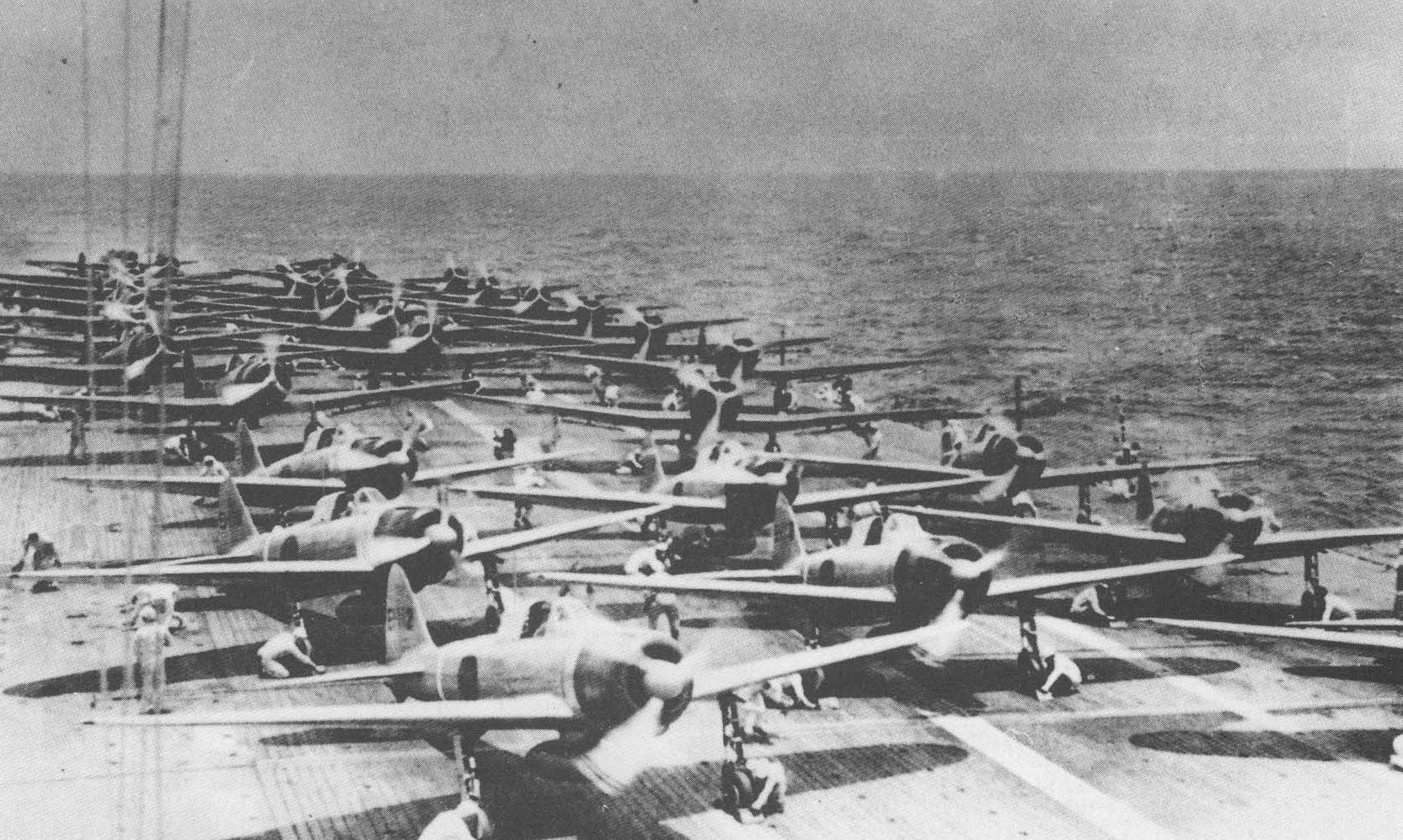
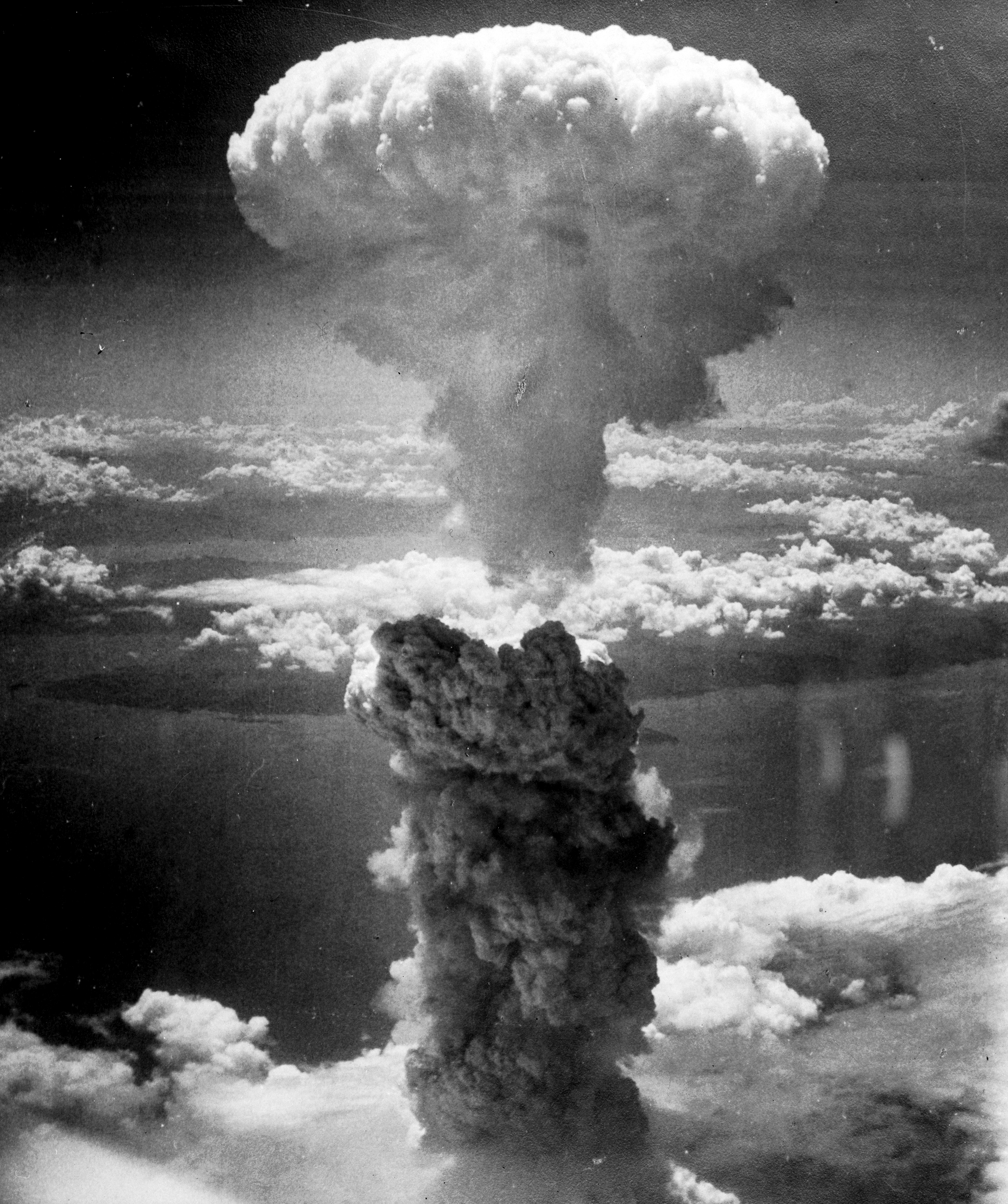
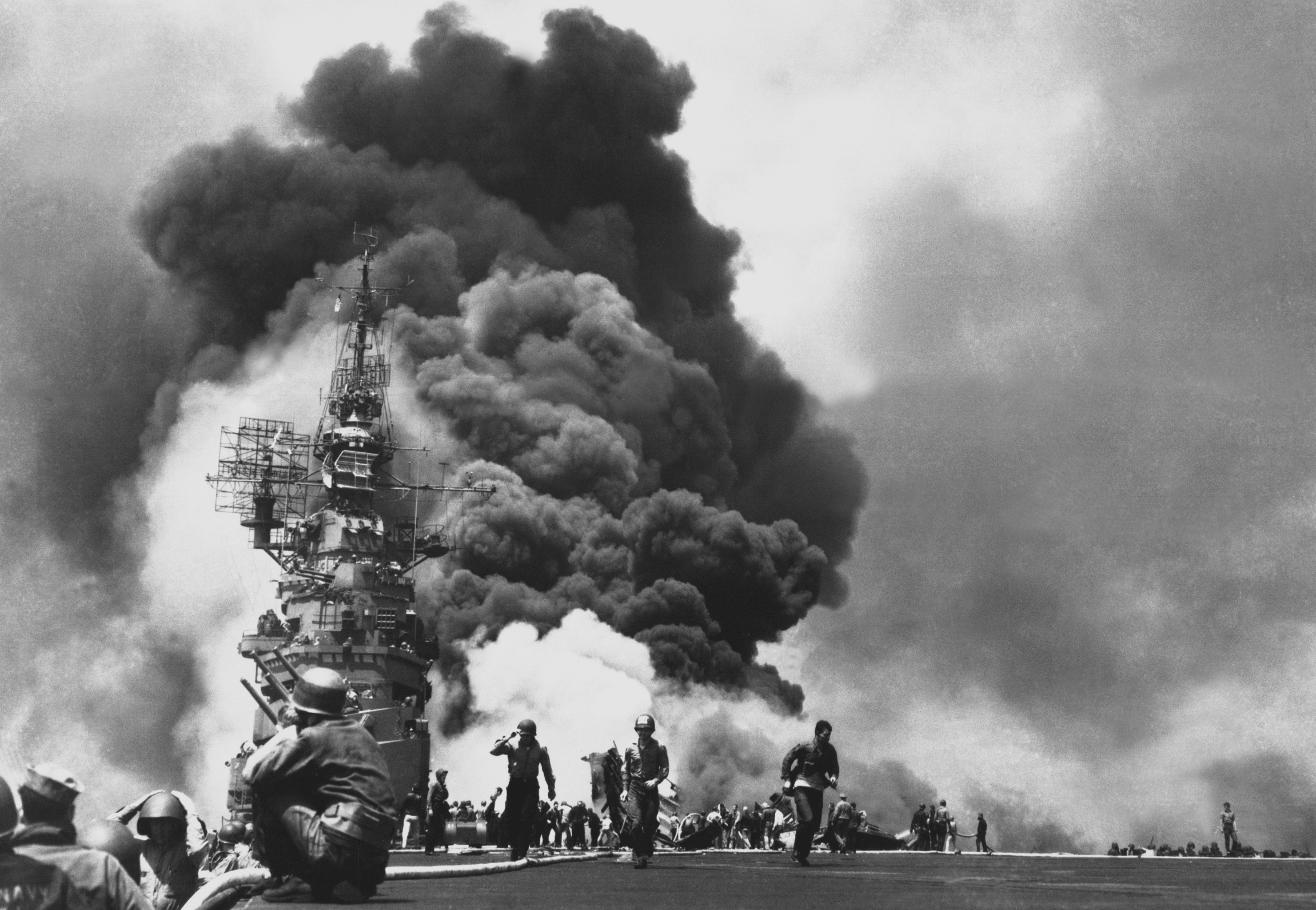
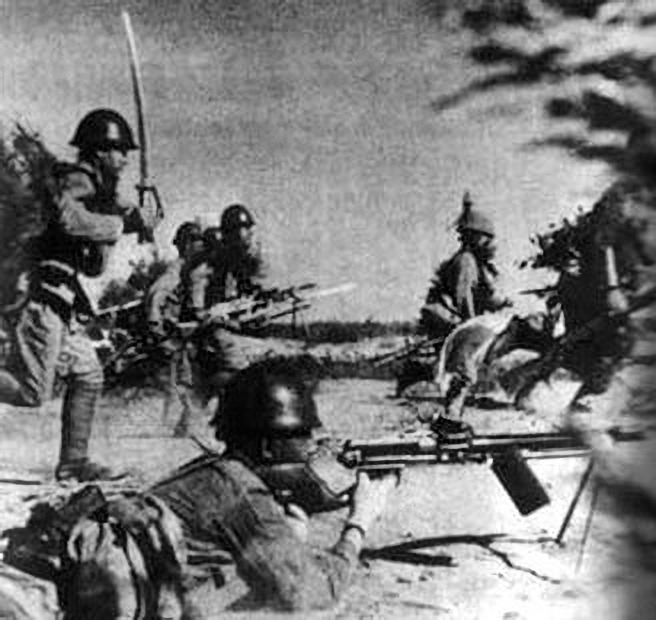
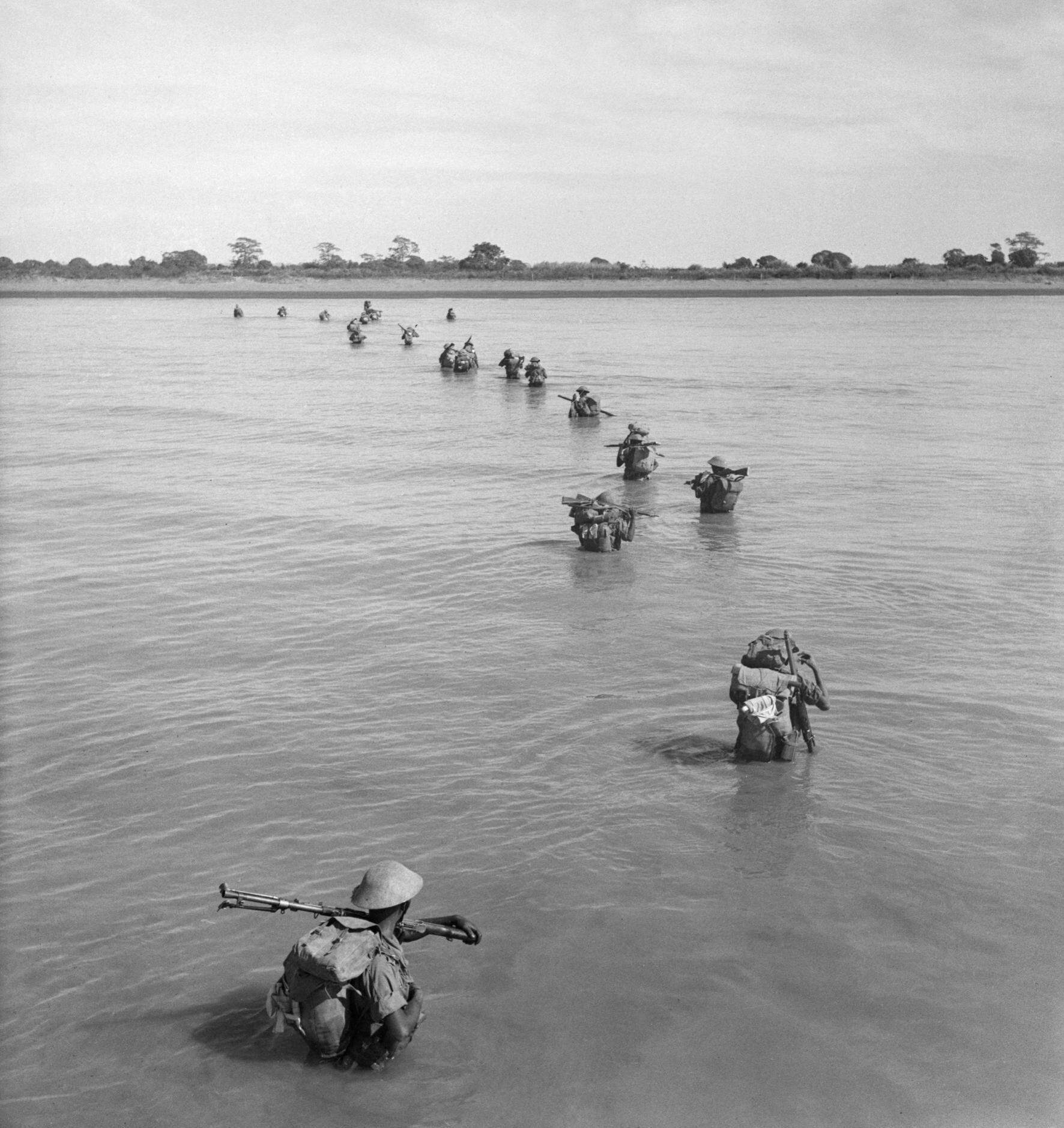
- Clockwise from top left: US marines raising a flag over Iwo Jima, 1945; Japanese naval aircraft prepare for takeoff to attack Pearl Harbor, 1941; USS Bunker Hill after being struck by kamikazes, 1945; Indian soldiers during the Burma campaign, 1945; Japanese soldiers in China during Operation Ichi-Go, 1944; Mushroom cloud after the atomic bombing of Nagasaki, 1945
Date	7 December 1941 – 2 September 1945 (Note: Although Japan had been invading and occupying large parts of China in a full-scale war since 1937, with early limited clashes dating back to 1931, war had not been officially declared. Japan would later attack Pearl Harbor on 7 December 1941, which brought the contained war in China into the wider global conflict.)
Location	East Asia; South Asia; Southeast Asia; Oceania; Pacific Ocean; Indian Ocean
Result	Allied victory
Territorial changes	Allied occupation of Japan: Removal of Japanese troops from China and retrocession of Taiwan to China; Liberation of Japanese occupied territories in Asia and the Pacific including Korea and Manchuria, followed by the division of Korea; Cession of Japanese-held islands in the Central Pacific Ocean to the United Nations, organized as the Trust Territory of the Pacific Islands; Seizure and annexation of South Sakhalin and the Kuril Islands by the Soviet Union

Belligerents
Allies China United States United Kingdom and Empire	Axis Japan

Commanders and leaders
Allied leaders Chiang Kai-shek Franklin D. Roosevelt Winston Churchill	Axis leaders Hirohito (surrendered)

Strength
23,275,564+ troops (total); (Republic of China (1912–1949)) 14,000,000; (United States) 3,621,383+ (1945) (Note: Strength of the US Military in Asia and the Pacific as of war's end: Army: 1,770,036, Navy (excluding Coast Guard and Marines): 1,366,716, and Marine Corps: 484,631. These figures do not include the Coast Guard or naval personnel in the China-Burma-India theater.); (United Kingdom) 400,000; (British Raj) 2,000,000; (Dutch East Indies) 140,000 (Note: Not including the Royal Netherlands Navy.); (Soviet Union) 1,747,465 (1945)	8,926,500–9,026,500+ troops (total); (Empire of Japan) 7,800,000–7,900,000 (1945); (Thailand) 126,500; Puppets: est. 1,000,000+ (1945)

Casualties and losses
Military 6 battleships 1 battlecruiser 11 aircraft carriers 16 cruisers 84 destroyers and frigates 63 submarines 21,555+ aircraft 2,300,000–4,000,000 + dead (1937–1945) (Note: Allied casualties: China: 3.8+ million casualties, including some 2 million deaths. According to updated official data from the State Council of the PRC, based on archival research, total combat casualties among Chinese military personnel (including Kuomintang forces, Communist units, and guerrilla formations) amounted to 3.8 million killed or dead from wounds; United States: 161,000 deaths, 248,000 wounded and 14,473 living POWs; British Empire: Up to 231,119 casualties, 82,000 dead; Australia: Over 51,000 17,501 killed; Philippines: 27,000 killed, more than 70,000 prisoners; Soviet Union: 30,253 total; Netherlands: 9,400 dead; France: Up to 20,000; Mongolia: 1,000; New Zealand: 578 dead; Mexico: 5 dead; Malaria was the most dangerous disease in the Pacific War. 500,000 American soldiers contracted the disease.) Civilians 26,000,000+ deaths (1937–1945) (Note: Estimates of roughly 12 million Chinese civilian deaths (1937–1945); around 4 million civilian deaths from the Dutch East Indies;, 1–2 million Vietnamese civilian deaths; around 3 million Indian civilian deaths in the Bengal famine of 1943; 0.5 to 1 million Filipino civilian deaths; 91,000 to 1,000,000 Burmese civilian deaths; 50,000 East Timorese civilian deaths; and hundreds of thousands of Malayan, Pacific and other civilian deaths.)	Military 11 battleships 22 aircraft carriers 38 cruisers 151 destroyers 131 submarines 43,125–50,000+ aircraft 2,500,000+ dead (1937–1945) (Note: 2,133,915 Japanese military deaths 1937–1945, 1.18 million Chinese collaborator casualties 1937–1945 (432,000 dead), 22,000 Burmese casualties, 5,600 Thai troops killed, and 2,615 Indian National Army (Azad Hind) killed/missing.) Civilians 1,000,000+ deaths (Note: 460,000 Japanese civilian deaths (338,000 in the bombings of Japan, 100,000 in the Battle of Okinawa, 22,000 in the Battle of Saipan), 543,000 Korean civilian deaths (mostly due to Japanese forced labor projects), 2,000–8,000 Thai civilian deaths)

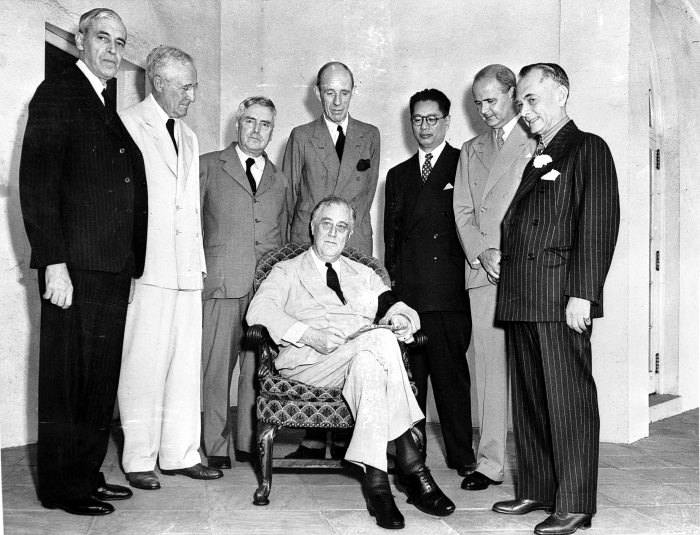
The Pacific War Council as photographed on 12 October 1942. Pictured are representatives from the United States (seated), Australia, Canada, New Zealand, the United Kingdom, China, the Netherlands, and the Philippine Commonwealth

The Pacific War, sometimes called the Asia–Pacific War or the Pacific Theater, was the theater of World War II fought between the Empire of Japan and the Allies in East and Southeast Asia, the Pacific and Indian Oceans, and Oceania. It was geographically the largest theater of World War II, encompassing the Pacific Ocean theater, the South West Pacific theater, the Second Sino-Japanese War, and the brief Soviet–Japanese War. The Pacific War included some of the largest naval battles in history. War between the Empire of Japan and the Republic of China had begun in 1937, with hostilities dating back to Japan's invasion of Manchuria in 1931, but the Pacific War is more widely accepted (Note: "For 53 long months, beginning in July 1937, China stood alone, single-handedly fighting an undeclared war against Japan. On 9 December 1941, after Japan's surprise attack on Pearl Harbor, what had been for so long a war between two countries now became part of a much wider Pacific conflict.") to have begun in 1941, when the United States and United Kingdom were brought into the war.

Japan invaded French Indochina in 1940, and extended its control over the entire territory in July 1941. On 7–8 December 1941, Japan launched multiple military campaigns across the Pacific: the attack the American naval base at Pearl Harbor in Hawaii; the U.S.-held Philippines, Guam, and Wake Island; and the British colonies of Malaya, Singapore, and Hong Kong; followed by a Japanese declaration of war. The Japanese achieved great success over the next six months, allying with Thailand and capturing all aforementioned territories but Hawaii, in addition to successful campaigns in Borneo, New Britain, the Dutch East Indies, Burma, the Solomon and Gilbert Islands, and parts of New Guinea. In May 1942, Japanese and Allied aircraft carriers fought at the Battle of the Coral Sea, resulting in the retreat of a Japanese invasion force headed for Port Moresby. In June, Japan both invaded the Aleutian Islands and was defeated at the Battle of Midway, considered a key turning point in the war; the Japanese subsequently experiencing great difficulty replacing their losses in ships and aircraft as the U.S. produced ever increasing numbers of both.

Major Allied offensives in the Pacific began in August 1942 with the Guadalcanal and New Guinea campaigns. These were followed by Operation Cartwheel from June 1943, which neutralized the major Japanese base at Rabaul on New Britain by early 1944. Elsewhere, Allied forces recaptured the Aleutian Islands by August 1943, and initiated the Gilbert and Marshall Islands campaign in November 1943, which lasted until February 1944. In the Battle of the Philippine Sea in June 1944, the Japanese fleet took heavy damage; the Allied campaign to recapture the Philippines began in October and set off the Battle of Leyte Gulf, after which the Japanese were unable to fight further surface engagements and resorted to kamikaze attacks. The rest of the war was characterized by an Allied strategy of island hopping, with invasions of the Mariana and Palau Islands, Iwo Jima, and Okinawa between June 1944 and June 1945. This enabled a blockade of the Japanese home islands and the start of a strategic air raid campaign which caused widespread urban destruction.

In China, Japan made large gains in Operation Ichi-Go between April and December 1944, while in Burma, the Japanese launched an offensive into India which was reversed by July 1944 and led to its liberation by the Allies in May 1945. From the start of the war, the Allies had adopted a "Europe first" stance, giving priority to defeating Germany; after Germany's surrender in May 1945, Allied forces were shifted to the Pacific in anticipation for Operation Downfall, a planned invasion of Japan. This became unnecessary after the U.S. atomic bombings of Hiroshima and Nagasaki on 6 and 9 August 1945 and Soviet invasion of Manchuria on 9 August, after which Japan surrendered unconditionally on 15 August and signed a surrender document on 2 September, ending World War II. Japan lost its former possessions in Asia and the Pacific, and was occupied by the Allies until 1952.

== Names of the war ==
In Allied countries during the war, the "Pacific War" was not usually distinguished from World War II, or was known simply as the War against Japan. In the United States, the term Pacific theater was widely used. The US Armed Forces considered the China Burma India theater to be distinct from the Asiatic-Pacific theater during the conflict.

Japan used the name Greater East Asia War (大東亜戦争, Dai Tō-A Sensō), as chosen by a cabinet decision on 10 December 1941, to refer to both the war with the Western Allies and the ongoing war in China. This name was released to the public on 12 December, with an explanation that it involved Asian nations achieving their independence from the Western powers through armed forces of the Greater East Asia Co-Prosperity Sphere. Japanese officials integrated what they called the Japan–China Incident (日支事変, Nisshi Jihen) into the Greater East Asia War. During the Occupation of Japan (1945–1952), these terms were prohibited in official documents (although their informal usage continued). The war became officially known as the Pacific War (太平洋戦争, Taiheiyō Sensō). The Fifteen Years' War (十五年戦争, Jūgonen Sensō) is also used, referring to the period from the Mukden incident of 1931 through 1945.

== Participants ==
Political map of the Asia-Pacific region, 1939

=== Allies ===
The major Allied participants included China, the United States, and the British Empire. China had already been engaged in a war against Japan since 1937. The US and its territories, including the Philippine Commonwealth, entered the war after the Japanese attack on Pearl Harbor in 1941, which was followed by declarations of war by Japan on Australia, Canada, New Zealand and the United Kingdom, as well as the Dutch government-in-exile which retained control of the Dutch East Indies. All of these were members of the Pacific War Council. From 1944 the French commando group Corps Léger d'Intervention also took part in resistance operations in Indochina. Some active pro-allied guerrillas in Asia included the Hukbalahap, the Korean Liberation Army, the Free Thai Movement, the Việt Minh, the Khmer Issarak, and the Malayan Peoples' Anti-Japanese Army.

The Soviet Union fought two short, undeclared border conflicts with Japan in 1938 and again in 1939, then remained neutral through the Soviet–Japanese Neutrality Pact of April 1941, until August 1945 when it (and Mongolia) joined the rest of the Allies and invaded the territory of Manchukuo, China, Inner Mongolia, and the Japanese territories such as Korea and South Sakhalin (Karafuto).

Mexico provided air support in the form of the 201st Fighter Squadron and Free France sent naval support in the form of Le Triomphant and later the Richelieu.

The Kingdom of Italy, following the day after the Armistice of Cassibile on 9 September 1943 was involved in multiple military confrontations with Japan in the numerous Italian Concessions in China, and later on, soon after Italy's official declaration of war on Japan on 15 July 1945, sent the Italian destroyer Carabiniere which participated in a total of 38 missions in the Pacific War.

=== Axis powers and aligned states ===
The Axis-aligned states which assisted the Empire of Japan included Thailand under a military government of Plaek Phibunsongkhram. Also involved were members of the Greater East Asia Co-Prosperity Sphere, which included the Manchukuo Imperial Army and Collaborationist Chinese Army of the Japanese puppet states of Manchukuo (consisting of most of Manchuria), and the collaborationist Wang Jingwei regime (which controlled the coastal regions of China), respectively.

Japan conscripted many soldiers from its colonies of Korea and Taiwan. Collaborationist security units were also formed in Hong Kong, Singapore, the Philippines, the Dutch East Indies, British Malaya, British Borneo, British Burma, former French Indochina (after the overthrow of the French regime in 1945), as well as Timorese militia. Macau was the only notable unoccupied European colony in the region, but its administrators Gabriel Maurício Teixeira and Pedro José Lobo were forced to accept Japanese demands anyway.

Germany and Italy both had limited involvement in the Pacific War. The German and the Italian navies operated submarines and raiding ships in the Indian and Pacific Oceans, notably the Monsun Gruppe.

== Theaters ==
Between 1942 and 1945, there were four main areas of conflict in the Pacific War: China, the Central Pacific, South-East Asia and the South West Pacific. US sources refer to two theaters within the Pacific War: the Pacific theater and the China Burma India Theater (CBI). However, these were not operational commands.

In the Pacific, the Allies divided operational control of their forces between two supreme commands, known as Pacific Ocean Areas and Southwest Pacific Area.

The Imperial Japanese Navy (IJN) did not integrate its units into permanent theater commands. The Imperial Japanese Army (IJA), which had already created the Kwantung Army to oversee its occupation of Manchukuo and the China Expeditionary Army during the Second Sino-Japanese War, created the Southern Expeditionary Army Group at the outset of its conquests of South East Asia. This headquarters controlled the bulk of the Japanese Army formations which opposed the Western Allies in the Pacific and South East Asia.

== Historical background ==
=== Conflict between China and Japan ===
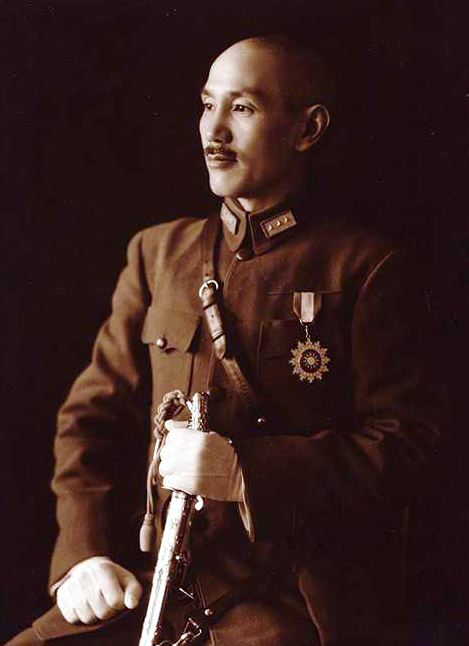
Generalissimo Chiang Kai-shek, Allied Commander-in-Chief in the China theater from 1942 to 1945

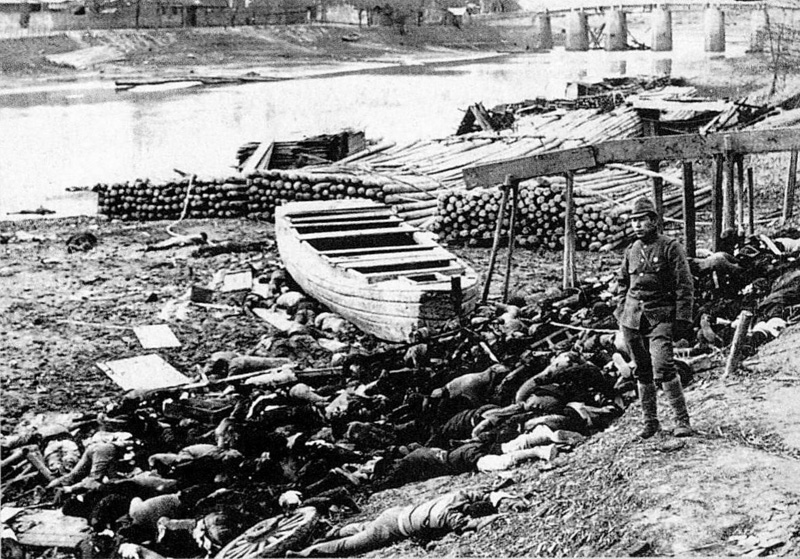
Victims of the Nanjing Massacre, where between 200,000 and 300,000 civilians and POWs were murdered by the Japanese Army

By 1937, Japan controlled Manchuria and was prepared to move deeper into China. The Marco Polo Bridge Incident on 7 July 1937 provoked full-scale war between China and Japan. The Nationalist Party and the Chinese Communists suspended their civil war in order to form a nominal alliance against Japan, and the Soviet Union quickly lent support by providing large amounts of materiel to Chinese troops. In August 1937, Generalissimo Chiang Kai-shek deployed some of his best troops to defend Shanghai against some 300,000 Japanese troops attempting to seize the city, which fell to Japan after three months of fighting. The Japanese continued to push deeper into China, capturing the capital Nanjing in mid-December 1937 and committing atrocities in the Nanjing Massacre, including rape, murder and torture.

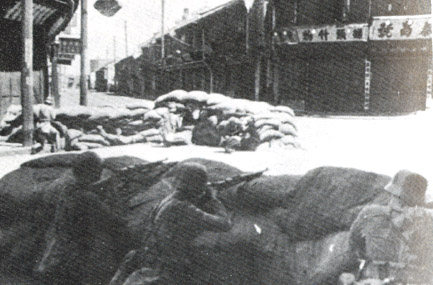
German-trained Chinese troops in downtown Shanghai, 1937

In March 1938, Nationalist forces won their first victory at Taierzhuang, but the city of Xuzhou (徐州) was taken by the Japanese in May. In June 1938, Japan deployed about 350,000 troops to invade Wuhan and captured it in October after a four-month campaign. The Japanese achieved major military victories, but world opinion—in particular in the US—was hostile to Japan's invasion, especially after the Panay incident. In addition, the Japanese had failed to destroy the Chinese army, which continued to resist from the new Nationalist capital in Chongqing, or in the case of the Communists, Yan'an.

In 1939, Japanese forces tried to push into the Soviet Far East. They were defeated in the Battle of Khalkhin Gol by a mixed Soviet and Mongolian force led by Georgy Zhukov. This caused the Japanese to abandon attempts to expand to the north, while Soviet aid to China ceased as a result of the Soviet–Japanese Neutrality Pact. In September 1940, Japan decided to invade French Indochina, which was controlled at the time by Vichy France. On 27 September Japan signed a military alliance with Germany and Italy, becoming one of the three main Axis powers.

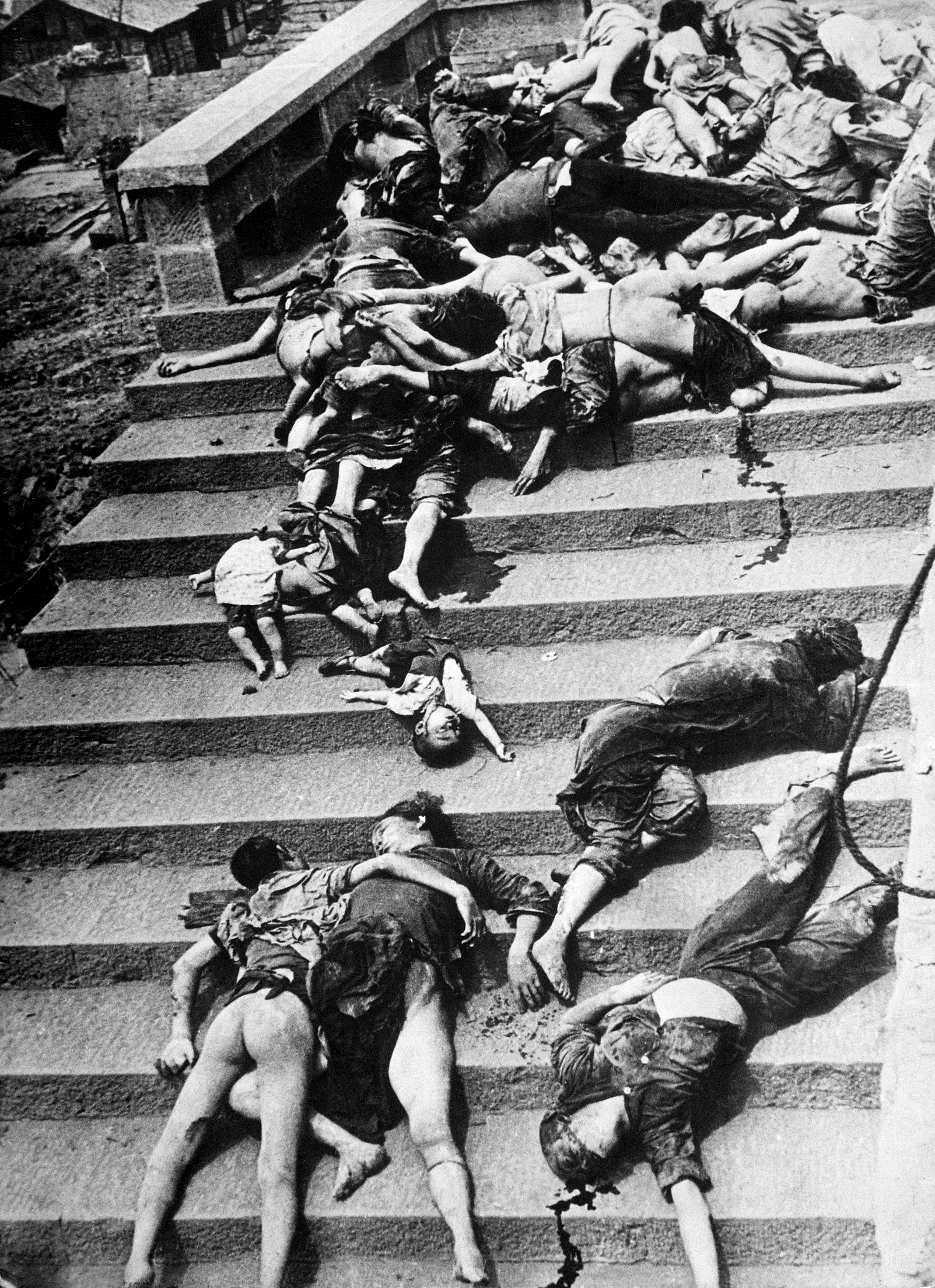
Chinese casualties of a mass panic during a June 1941 Japanese aerial bombing of Chongqing

The war entered a new phase with Japanese defeats at the Battle of Suixian–Zaoyang, the 1st Battle of Changsha, the Battle of Kunlun Pass and the Battle of Zaoyi. After these victories, Chinese nationalist forces launched a large-scale counter-offensive in early 1940; however, due to a lack of military-industrial capacity, they were repulsed in late March 1940. In August 1940, Chinese communists launched an offensive in Central China; in retaliation, Japan instituted the "Three Alls Policy" ("Kill all, Burn all, Loot all") in occupied areas, killing at least 2.7 million civilians.

By 1941 the conflict had become a stalemate. Although Japan had occupied much of northern, central, and coastal China, the Nationalist Government had retreated to the interior and set up a provisional capital at Chongqing, while the Chinese communists remained in control of base areas in Shaanxi. Japanese offensive action against the retreating and regrouping Chinese forces was largely stalled by the mountainous terrain in southwestern China, while the Communists organized widespread guerrilla and saboteur activities in northern and eastern China behind the Japanese front line.

Japan sponsored several puppet governments, one of which was headed by Wang Jingwei. Conflicts between Chinese Communist and Nationalist forces vying for territorial control behind enemy lines culminated in a major armed clash in January 1941, effectively ending their co-operation.

Japanese strategic bombing efforts mostly targeted large Chinese cities such as Shanghai, Wuhan, and Chongqing, with around 5,000 raids from February 1938 to August 1943. Japan's strategic bombing campaigns killed between 260,000 and 350,934 non-combatants.

By the eve of Pearl Harbor, some 7,500,000 Chinese soldiers and civilians had died in the Japanese invasion. Japanese casualties by the end of 1941, per their own records, were some 600,000 including 185,000 killed.

=== Tensions between Japan and the West ===
As early as 1935, Japanese military strategists had concluded that the Dutch East Indies were, due to their abundant oil reserves, crucially important for further expansion by the Japanese Empire. By 1940 the Japanese also included Indochina, Malaya, and the Philippines within their concept of the Greater East Asia Co-Prosperity Sphere. Japanese troop build-ups in Hainan, Taiwan, and Haiphong were noted in foreign media, Japanese military officers were increasingly and openly talking about the prospect of war, and Admiral Sankichi Takahashi was reported as stating that a showdown with the US was necessary.

In an effort to discourage Japanese militarism, Western powers including Australia, the US, Britain, and the Dutch government in exile, which controlled the Dutch East Indies, stopped selling oil, iron ore, and steel to Japan. In Japan, the government and Japanese nationalists viewed these embargoes as acts of aggression; imported oil made up about 80% of domestic consumption, without which Japan's economy would grind to a halt. The Japanese media, influenced by military propagandists, (Note: "It was not an official term, but a term of incitement used by the Japanese media, under the guidance of the military, in order to stir up the Japanese people's sense of crisis...") began to refer to the embargoes as the "ABCD line" ("American-British-Chinese-Dutch").

=== Japanese preparations ===
The Japanese Imperial General Headquarters (GHQ) began planning for a war with the Western powers in April or May 1941. Japan increased its naval budget and placed large formations of the Army, along with their attached air components, under the command of the Imperial Japanese Navy. Historically, the IJA consumed the majority of the state's military budget (with a 73% – 27% split in 1940), but from 1942 to 1945 the IJA would account for 60% of Japan's military spending, while the IJN would account for 40%. Japan's key initial objective was to seize economic resources in the Dutch East Indies and Malaya, in order to alleviate the effects of the Allied embargo. This was known as the Southern Plan. It was decided—because of the close relationship between the UK and the US, and the belief that the US would inevitably become involved in the ongoing war in Europe—that Japan would also seize the Philippines, Wake Island and Guam.

Japan had initially planned for a limited war, where Japanese forces would seize key objectives and then establish a defensive perimeter to absorb and defeat Allied counterattacks; Japanese decision-makers believed such a military situation would lead to a negotiated peace that would preserve Japanese territorial gains. Japanese planning divided the early war into two operational phases. The First Operational Phase was further divided into three separate parts in which the major objectives of the Philippines, British Malaya, Borneo, Burma, Rabaul and the Dutch East Indies would be occupied. The Second Operational Phase called for further expansion into the South Pacific by seizing eastern New Guinea, New Britain, Fiji, Samoa, and strategic points in and around Australia. In the Central Pacific, Midway Island was targeted, as were the Aleutian Islands in the North Pacific. Japanese strategists believed that the seizure of these key areas would provide defensive depth and deny the Allies staging areas from which to mount a counteroffensive.

By November 1941 these plans were mostly complete, and were modified only slightly over the next month. Japanese military planners' expectation of success rested on the United Kingdom and the Soviet Union being unable to effectively respond to a Japanese attack because of the threat posed to each by Nazi Germany; in particular, the Soviet Union was seen as unlikely to commence hostilities.

The Japanese leadership was aware that a total military victory in the traditional sense against the United States was impossible, and instead envisaged that rapid, aggressive and expansive conquest would force the US to agree to a negotiated peace that would recognize Japanese hegemony in Asia.

== Japanese offensives, 1941–1942 ==
Following prolonged tensions between Japan and the Western powers, units of the IJN and IJA launched simultaneous surprise attacks on the United States and the British Empire on 7 December (8 December in Asia/West Pacific time zones). The locations of this first wave of Japanese attacks included the American territories of Hawaii, the Philippines, Guam, and Wake Island and the British territories of Malaya, Singapore, and Hong Kong. Concurrently, Japanese forces invaded southern and eastern Thailand and were resisted for several hours, before the Thai government signed an armistice and entered an alliance with Japan. Although Japan declared war on the United States and the British Empire, the declaration was not delivered until after Japanese forces had already struck British and American targets.

=== Attack on Pearl Harbor ===
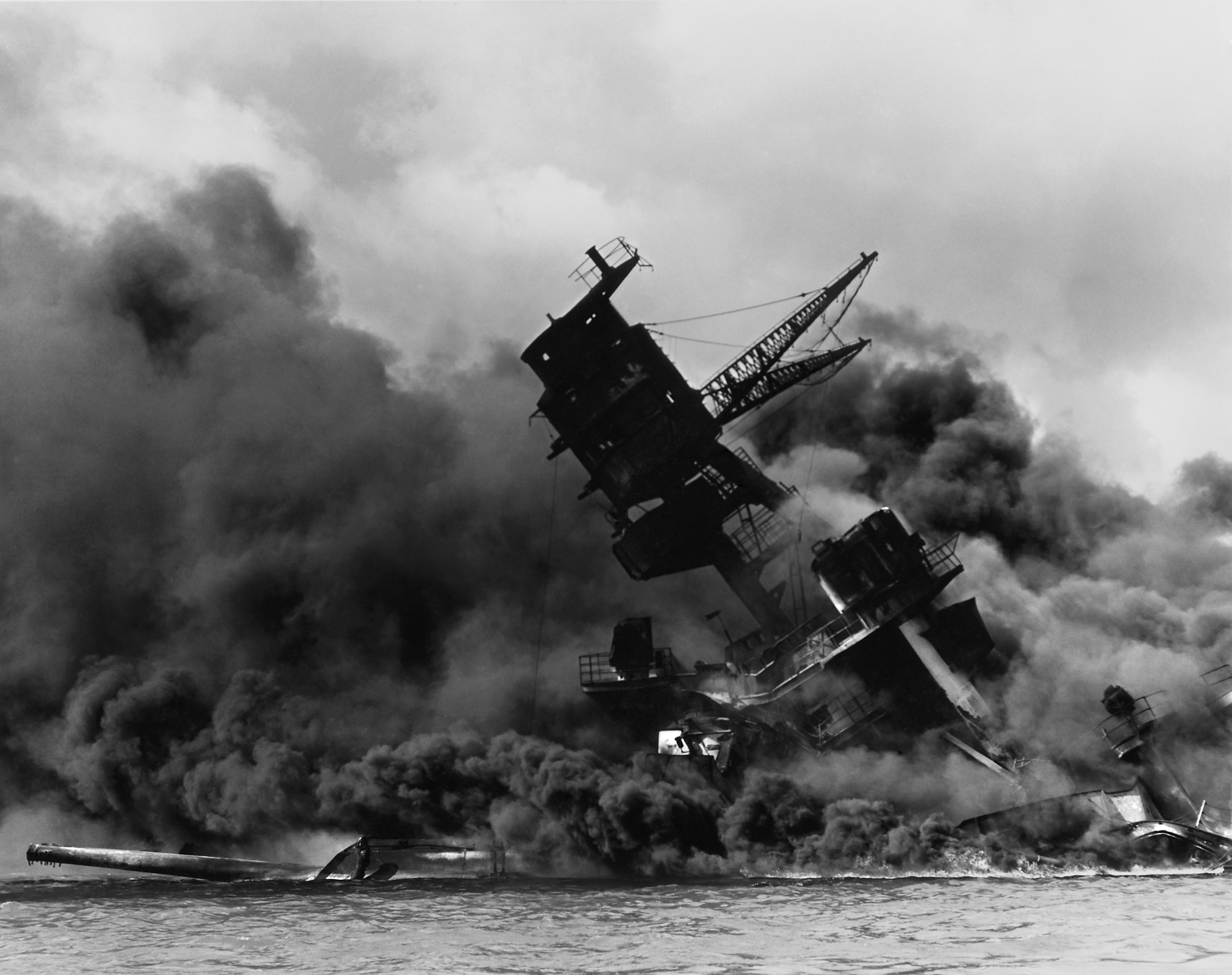
USS Arizona burned for two days after being hit by a Japanese bomb in the attack on Pearl Harbor.

In the early hours of 7 December (Hawaiian time), carrier-based Japanese aircraft launched a surprise, large-scale air strike on the US Pacific Fleet's anchorage at Pearl Harbor in Honolulu, which knocked eight American battleships out of action, destroyed 188 American aircraft, and killed 2,403 Americans. The Japanese believed that the Americans, faced with such a sudden and massive blow to their naval power in the Pacific, would agree to a negotiated settlement. However, American losses were less serious than initially thought: the three American aircraft carriers were at sea during the attack, and vital naval infrastructure, Honolulu's submarine base, and signals intelligence units were unscathed. The fact that the bombing happened while the US was not officially at war (Note: The Neutrality Patrol had US destroyers fighting at sea, but no state of war had been declared by Congress.) caused a wave of outrage across the country. Japan's fallback strategy, relying on a war of attrition against the United States, was beyond the Imperial Japanese Navy's capabilities.

Opposition to war in the United States vanished after the attack. On 8 December, the United Kingdom, (Note: See United Kingdom declaration of war on Japan.) the United States, (Note: See United States declaration of war on Japan.) Canada, and the Netherlands declared war on Japan, followed by Australia the next day.

=== South-East Asian campaigns of 1941–1942 ===
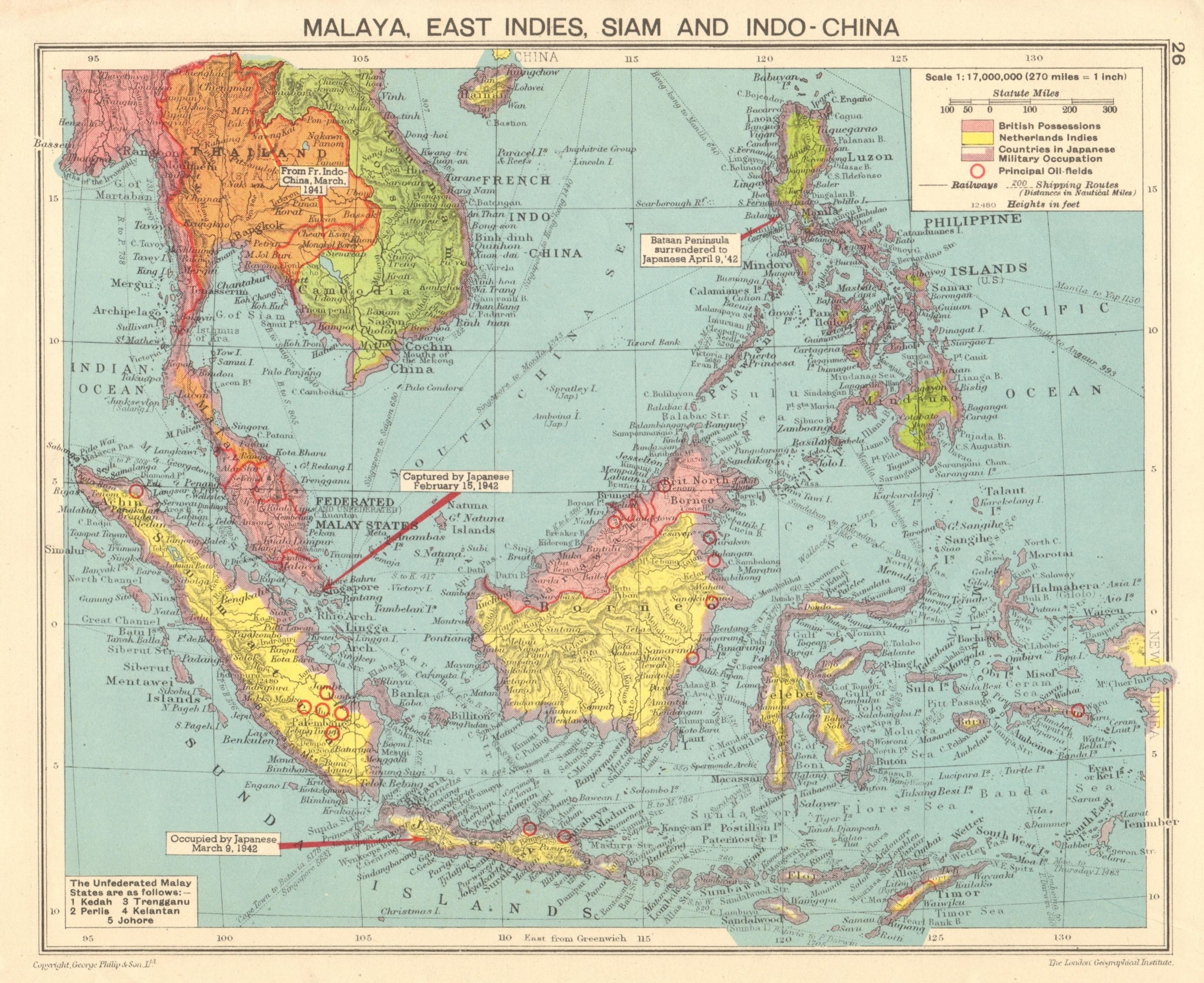
Malaya, East Indies, Siam and Indo-China Map, 1942

Thailand, with its territory already serving as a springboard for Japan's Malayan Campaign, surrendered within hours of the Japanese invasion. The government of Thailand formally allied with Japan on 21 December. To the south, the IJA seized the British colony of Penang on 19 December, encountering little resistance. Hong Kong was attacked on 8 December and fell to Japanese forces on 25 December 1941. American bases on Guam and Wake Island were seized by Japan at around the same time. British, Australian, and Dutch forces, already drained of personnel and matériel by two years of war with Germany, and heavily committed in the Middle East, North Africa, and elsewhere, were unable to provide more than token resistance. Two major British warships, the battlecruiser HMS Repulse and the battleship HMS Prince of Wales, were sunk by a Japanese air attack off Malaya on 10 December 1941.

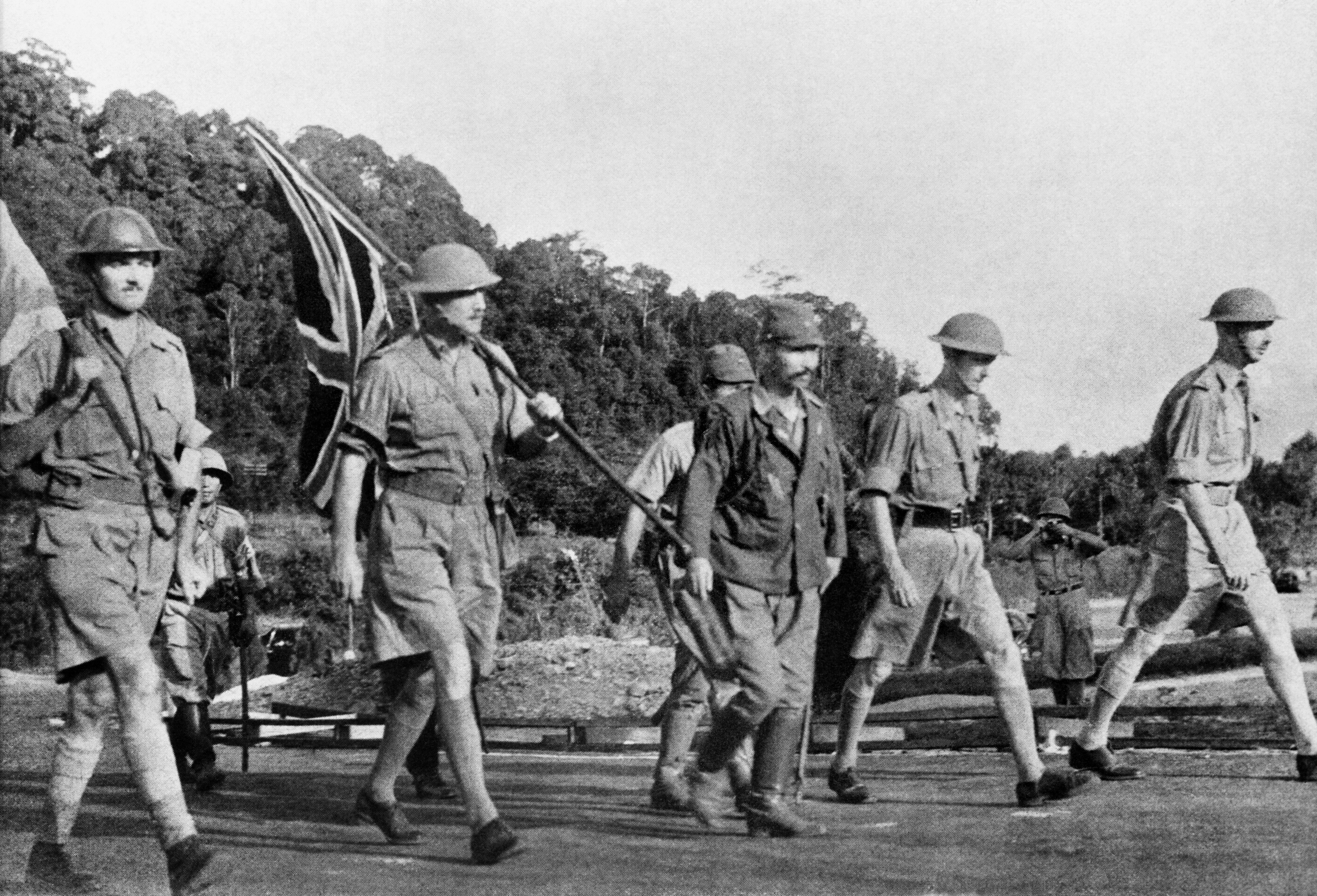
British forces surrender Singapore to the Japanese, February 1942

Following the Declaration by United Nations on 1 January 1942, the Allied governments appointed the British General Archibald Wavell to the American-British-Dutch-Australian Command (ABDACOM), a supreme command for Allied forces in Southeast Asia. This gave Wavell nominal control of a huge force, albeit one that was thinly spread across a vast area, from Burma to the Philippines to northern Australia. Other regions, including India, Hawaii, and the rest of Australia, remained under local commands. On 15 January, Wavell moved to Bandung in Java to assume control of ABDACOM.

In January, Japan invaded British Burma, the Dutch East Indies, New Guinea, and the Solomon Islands, and captured Manila, Kuala Lumpur and Rabaul. After being driven out of Malaya, Allied forces in Singapore attempted to resist the Japanese during the Battle of Singapore, but were forced to surrender to the Japanese on 15 February 1942. About 130,000 Indian, British, Australian and Dutch personnel became Japanese prisoners of war. Bali and Timor fell in February. The rapid collapse of Allied resistance left the "ABDA area" split in two. Wavell resigned from ABDACOM on 25 February, handing control of the ABDA Area to local commanders and returning to the post of Commander-in-Chief, India.

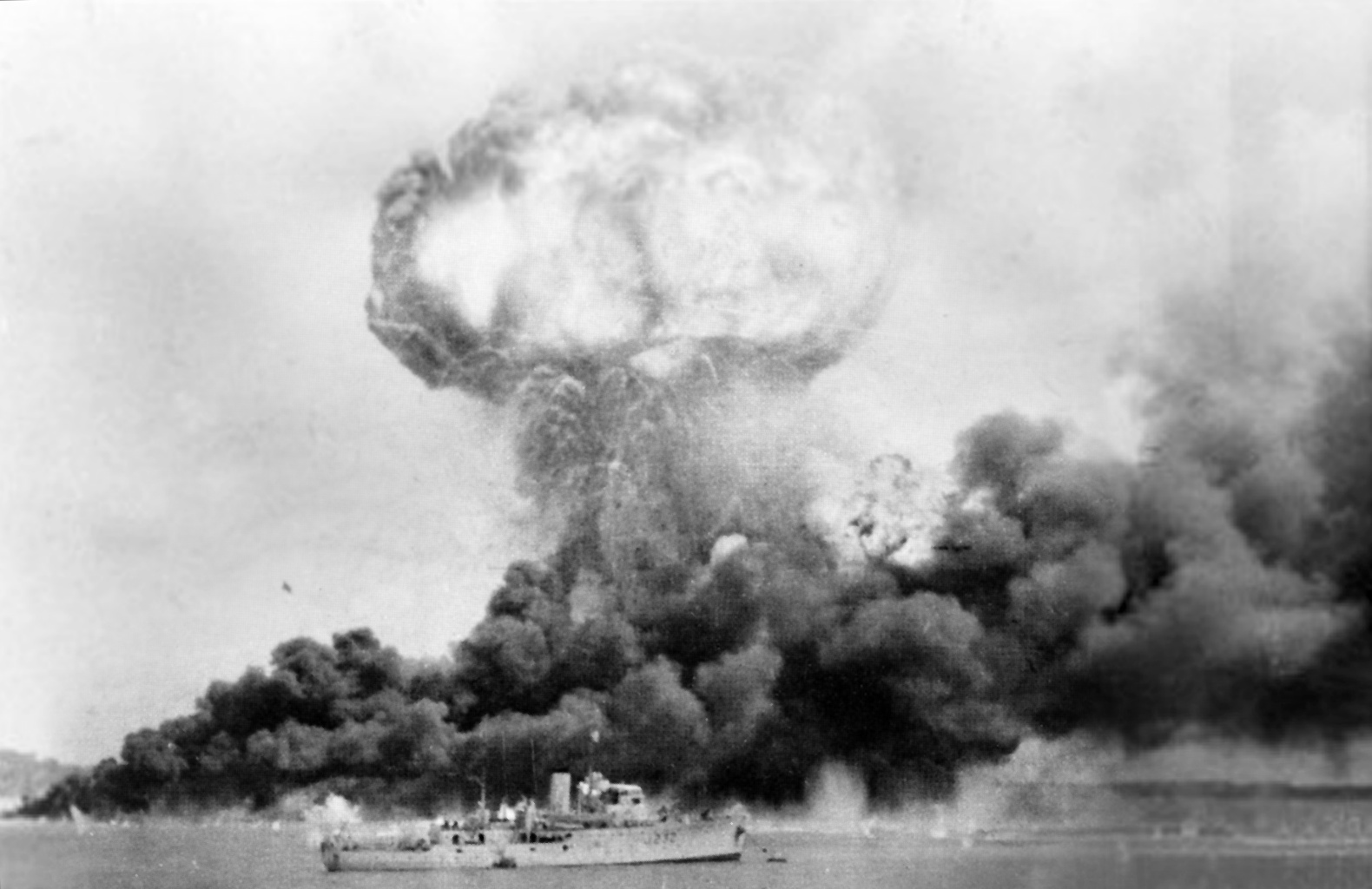
The Bombing of Darwin, Australia, 19 February 1942

Meanwhile, Japanese aircraft had all but eliminated Allied air power in Southeast Asia and were carrying out air attacks on northern Australia, beginning with a bombing of the city of Darwin on 19 February, which killed at least 243 people.

At the Battle of the Java Sea in late February and early March, the IJN defeated the main ABDA naval force, under Admiral Karel Doorman. The Dutch East Indies campaign ended with the surrender of Allied forces on Java and Sumatra.

In March and April, an IJN carrier force launched a raid into the Indian Ocean. British Royal Navy bases in Ceylon were hit and the aircraft carrier HMS Hermes was sunk, along with other Allied ships. The attack forced the Royal Navy to withdraw to the western part of the Indian Ocean, paving the way for a Japanese assault on Burma and India.

In Burma, the Japanese captured Moulmein on 31 January 1942, and then drove outnumbered British and Indian troops towards the Sittang River. On 23 February, a bridge over the river was demolished prematurely, stranding most of an Indian division. On 8 March, the Japanese occupied Rangoon. The Allies attempted to defend Central Burma, with Indian and Burmese divisions holding the Irrawaddy River valley and the Chinese Expeditionary Force in Burma defending Toungoo. On 16 April, 7,000 British soldiers were encircled by the Japanese 33rd Division during the Battle of Yenangyaung, but subsequently rescued by the Chinese 38th Division, led by Sun Li-jen. Meanwhile, in the Battle of Yunnan-Burma Road, the Japanese captured Toungoo after hard fighting and sent motorized units to capture Lashio. This cut the Burma Road, which was the western Allies' supply line to Chinese Nationalist troops. Many of Chinese troops were forced either to retreat to India, or withdraw in small parties to Yunnan. Accompanied by large numbers of civilian refugees, the British retreated to Imphal in Manipur, abandoning most of their transportation and equipment. They reached Imphal in May just as the monsoon descended, which halted the operations of both sides in the area.

Within China, cooperation between the Chinese Nationalists and the Communists had waned from its zenith at the Battle of Wuhan, and the relationship between the two had soured as both attempted to expand their areas of operation and influence. The Japanese exploited this lack of unity to press their offensive operations in China.

=== Philippines ===
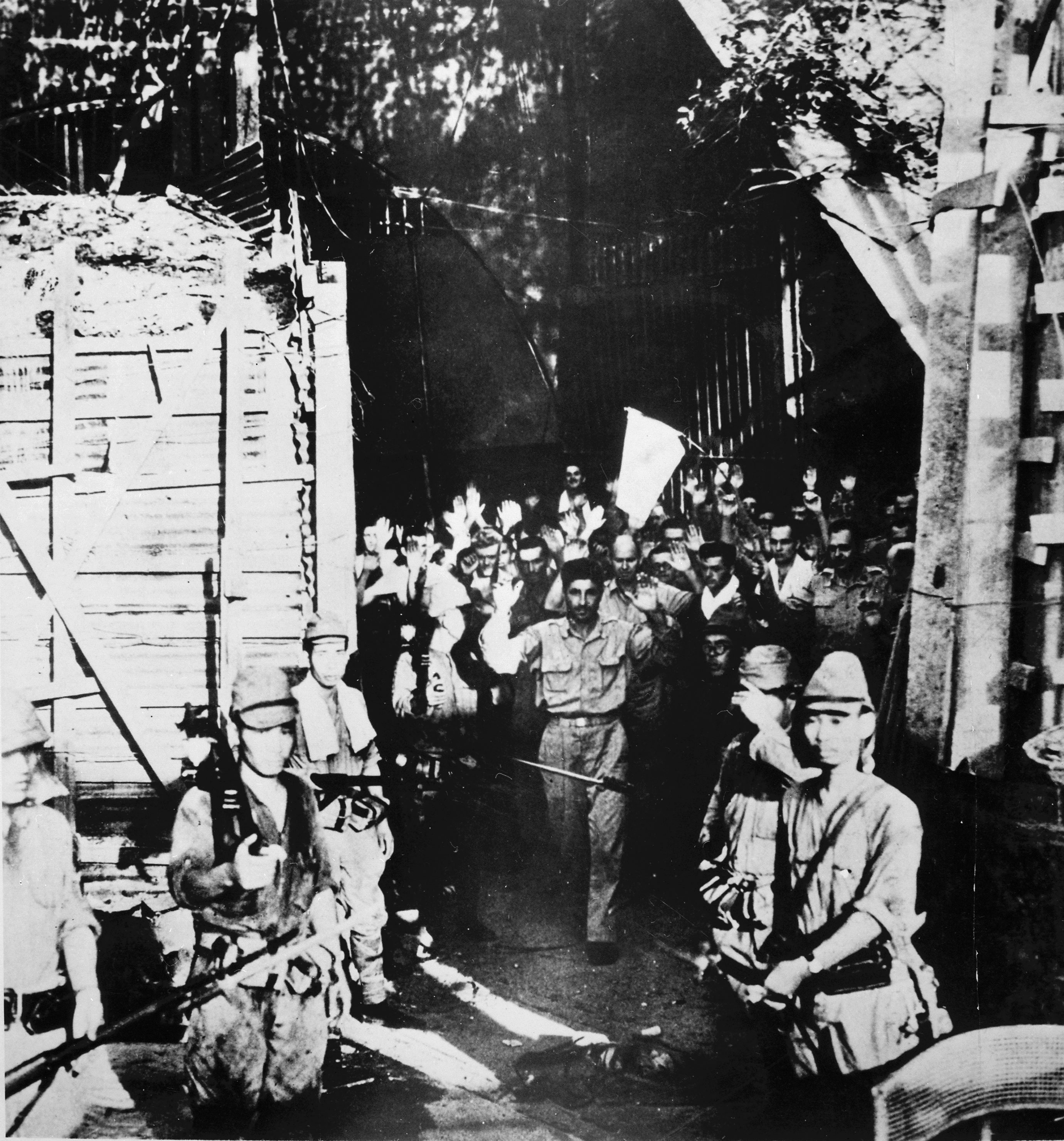
Surrender of US forces at Corregidor, Philippines, May 1942

On 8 December 1941, Japanese bombers struck American airfields on Luzon. They caught most American planes on the ground, destroying 103 aircraft, more than half of the US air strength in the Philippines. Two days later, further air raids destroyed the Cavite Naval Yard. By 13 December, Japanese attacks had wrecked every major airfield and virtually annihilated American air power in the region. The previous month, a portion of the US Asiatic Fleet had been sent to the southern Philippines. However, with little air protection, the remaining surface vessels in the Philippines, especially the larger ships, were ordered to sail for Java or Australia, and the remaining American bombers in the area flew to Australia in mid-December. The only American forces that remained to defend the Philippines were the ground troops, a few fighter aircraft, about 30 submarines, and a few small vessels.

The main Japanese landings on Luzon took place on 22 and 24 December. As the Japanese troops converged on Manila, General Douglas MacArthur began executing plans to make a final stand on the Bataan Peninsula and the island of Corregidor. A series of rearguard actions brought the bulk of his troops safely into Bataan, while the Japanese entered Manila unopposed on 2 January 1942. On 7 January, the Japanese attacked Bataan. After some initial success, they were stalled by disease and casualties; however, Japanese forces could be reinforced, while the Americans and Filipinos were entirely isolated from resupply. On 11 March 1942, under orders from President Roosevelt, MacArthur abandoned Corregidor for Australia, and Lieutenant General Jonathan M. Wainwright assumed command in the Philippines. The defenders on Bataan, running low on ammunition and supplies, could no longer withstand the pressure from Japanese attacks. Bataan fell on 9 April, and the 76,000 American and Filipino prisoners of war taken on the peninsula were subjected to the 66 miles (106 km) long Bataan Death March. On the night of 5–6 May, after an intensive aerial and artillery bombardment, the Japanese landed on Corregidor and Wainwright surrendered. In the southern Philippines, where key ports and airfields had already been seized, the remaining American-Filipino forces surrendered on 9 May.

=== Threat to Australia ===
In late 1941, as the Japanese struck at Pearl Harbor, most of Australia's best forces were committed in the Mediterranean Theatre. Australia was ill-prepared for an attack, lacking armaments, modern fighter aircraft, heavy bombers, and aircraft carriers. While still calling for reinforcements from Churchill, the Australian Prime Minister John Curtin called for American support with an announcement on 27 December 1941:

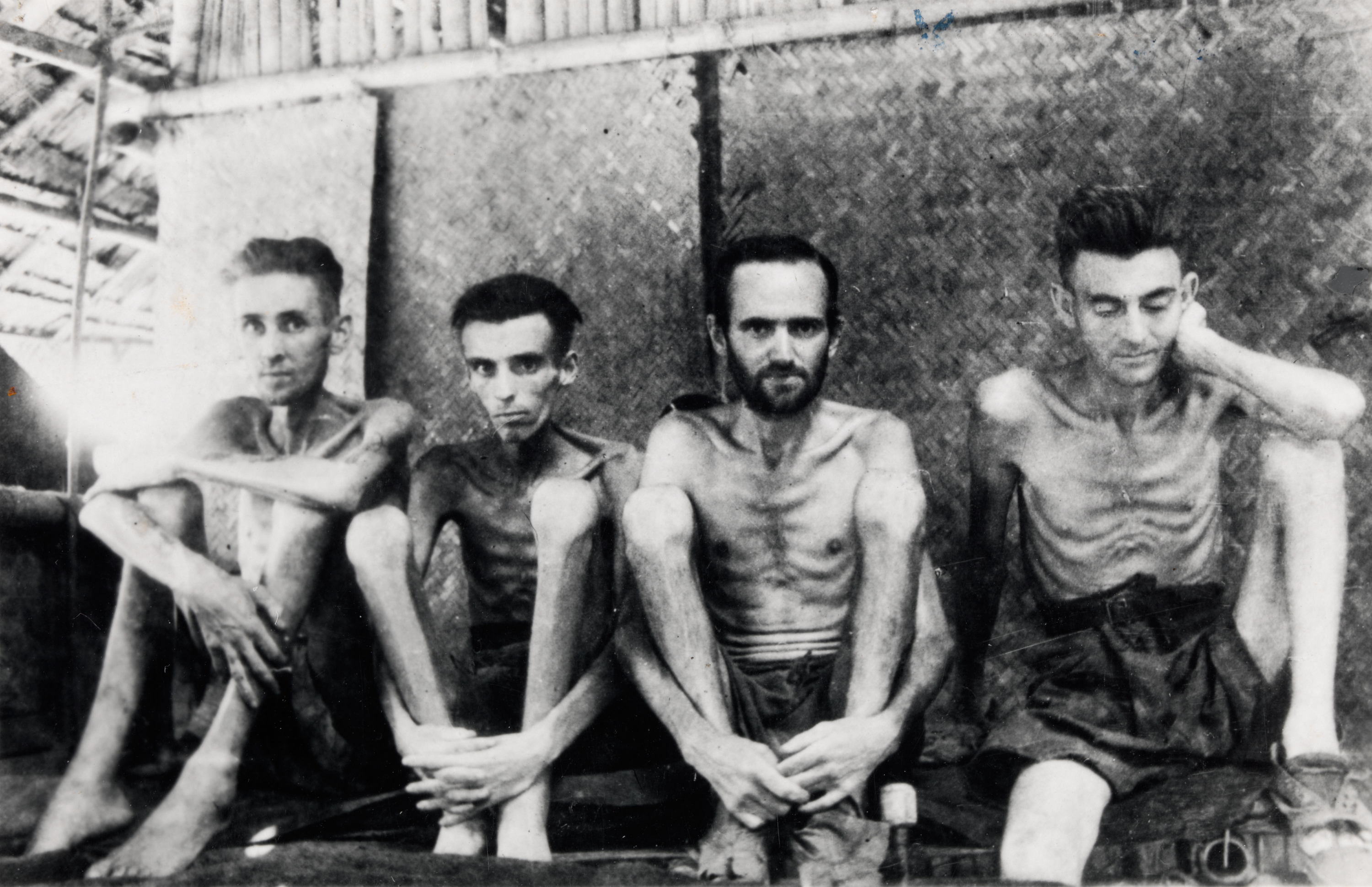
Dutch and Australian PoWs at Tarsau, in Thailand in 1943. 22,000 Australians were captured by the Japanese; 8,000 died as prisoners of war.

The Australian Government ... regards the Pacific struggle as primarily one in which the United States and Australia must have the fullest say in the direction of the democracies' fighting plan. Without inhibitions of any kind, I make it clear that Australia looks to America, free of any pangs as to our traditional links or kinship with the United Kingdom.

— Prime Minister John Curtin

Australia had been shocked by the speed of the collapse of Commonwealth forces in British Malaya and Singapore, in which around 15,000 Australian soldiers became prisoners of war. Curtin predicted that the "battle for Australia" was imminent. The Japanese established a major base in the Australian Territory of New Guinea beginning with the capture of Rabaul on 23 January 1942. On 19 February 1942, Darwin was hit by an air raid, the first time the Australian mainland had come under foreign attack. Over the following 19 months, Australia was attacked from the air by the Japanese almost 100 times.

In early 1942, elements of the IJN proposed an invasion of Australia. The IJA opposed the plan and it was rejected in favor of isolating Australia via naval blockade, by advancing through the South Pacific. The Japanese decided upon a seaborne invasion of Port Moresby on the southern coast of New Guinea, which would put Northern Australia within range of Japanese bomber aircraft.

President Franklin Roosevelt ordered MacArthur to formulate a Pacific defense plan in conjunction with Australia in March 1942. Curtin agreed to place Australian forces under the command of MacArthur, who became Supreme Commander, South West Pacific. MacArthur moved his headquarters to Melbourne in March 1942 and American troops began massing in Australia. Japanese naval activity reached Sydney in late May 1942, when IJN midget submarines launched a raid on Sydney Harbour. On 8 June 1942, two Japanese submarines briefly shelled Sydney's eastern suburbs and the city of Newcastle.

== Allies re-group, 1942–1943 ==
In early 1942, the governments of smaller Allied powers began to push for an inter-governmental Asia-Pacific war council. The Pacific War Council was formed in Washington DC on 1 April 1942, with President Franklin D. Roosevelt, his key advisor Harry Hopkins, and representatives from Britain, China, Australia, the Netherlands, New Zealand, and Canada. Representatives from India and the Philippines were later added. The council never had any direct operational control, and any decisions it made were referred to the US-UK Combined Chiefs of Staff. Australian and Dutch forces led civilians in a prolonged guerilla campaign in Portuguese Timor.

=== Japanese strategy and the Doolittle Raid ===
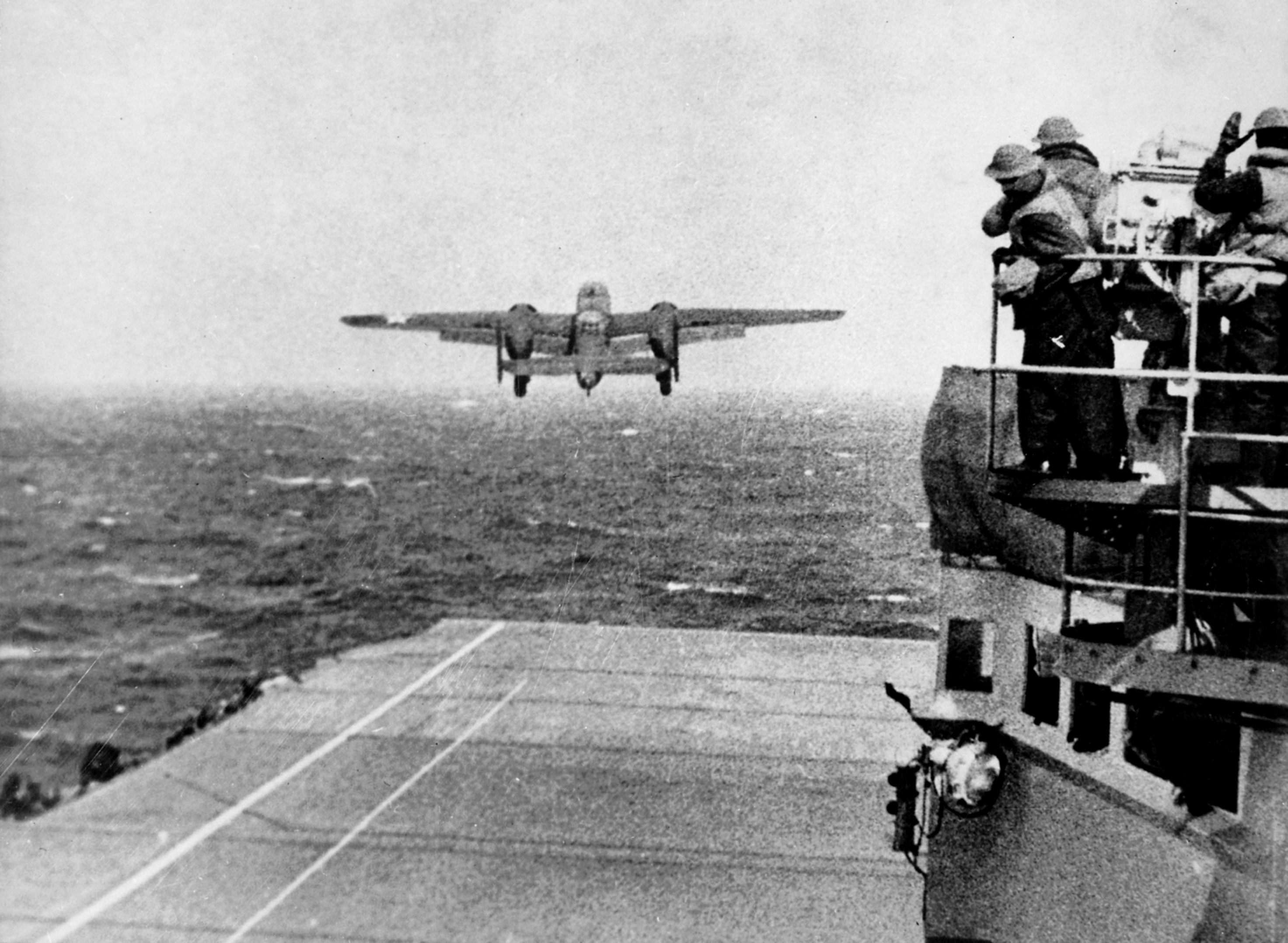
A B-25 bomber takes off from USS Hornet as part of the Doolittle Raid.

The Second Operational Phase was planned to expand Japan's strategic depth by conquering eastern New Guinea, New Britain, the Aleutians, Midway, Fiji, Samoa, and strategic points in the Australian area. The Naval General Staff advocated an advance to the south to seize parts of Australia, but with large numbers of troops engaged in China and Manchuria, the IJA declined to contribute the necessary ground forces for the operation. The Naval General Staff still wanted to cut the sea links between Australia and the United States by capturing New Caledonia, Fiji, and Samoa. Because this required far fewer troops, on 13 March the Naval General Staff and the Army agreed to prepare for operations to capture Fiji and Samoa. The Second Operational Phase began when Lae and Salamaua, located in eastern New Guinea, were captured on 8 March. However, on 10 March, American carrier aircraft attacked the Japanese invasion forces and inflicted considerable losses. The raid had major operational implications, as it forced the Japanese to postpone their advance in the South Pacific until the Combined Fleet allocated sufficient naval forces to protect future offensive operations in the region.

Concurrently, the United States conducted the Doolittle Raid on the Japanese mainland in April 1942, in which 16 bombers took off from the aircraft carrier USS Hornet, 600 miles (970 km) from Japan. The raid inflicted minimal material damage on Japanese soil but was a significant boost for American morale; it also had psychological repercussions in Japan, exposing the danger to the Japanese homeland posed by American carrier forces. With only Marcus Island and a line of converted trawlers patrolling the vast waters that separate Wake Island and Kamchatka, the Japanese east coast was left open to further attacks similar to Doolittle.

Admiral Yamamoto proposed a strategy to bring about the destruction of the US Navy by occupying Midway Atoll, an objective he thought the Americans would be certain to fight for, as Japanese aircraft based on Midway could threaten Hawaii. During a series of meetings held from 2–5 April, the Naval General Staff and representatives of the Combined Fleet reached a compromise. Yamamoto was allowed to attempt his Midway operation, but only after he had threatened to resign. In return, Yamamoto had to allocate one carrier division to the operation against Port Moresby, as well as carrying out amphibious landings on strategic points in the Aleutian Islands simultaneously with the Midway operation. These concessions drew valuable Japanese military assets away from the attack on Midway, and were enough to remove the Japanese margin of superiority in the Midway attack.

=== Coral Sea ===
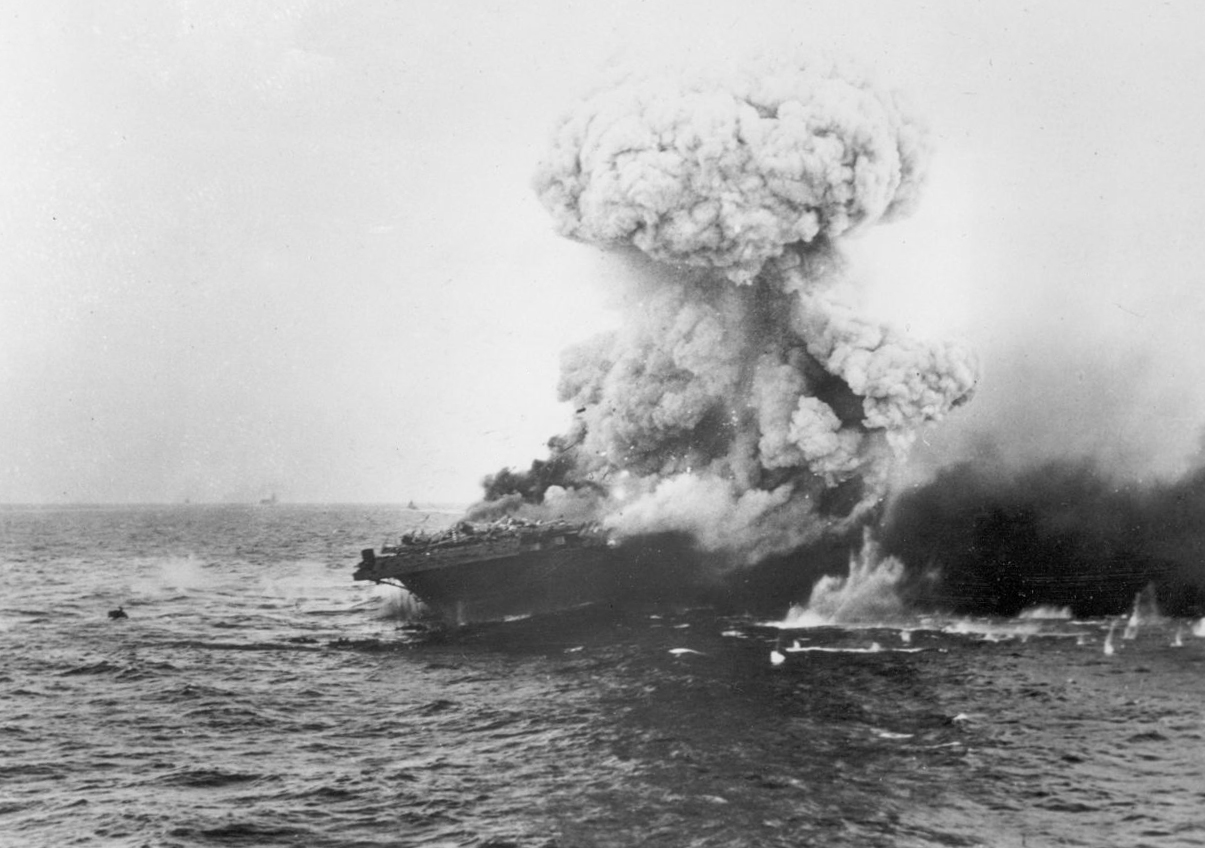
The aircraft carrier USS Lexington explodes on 8 May 1942, several hours after being damaged by a Japanese carrier air attack.

The Japanese assault on Port Moresby was codenamed the MO Operation and was divided into several parts. The island of Tulagi, in the Solomon chain, would be occupied on 3 May; IJN carriers would then conduct a sweep through the Coral Sea to the south to find and destroy Allied naval forces. The Japanese scheduled amphibious landings to capture Port Moresby for 10 May. The MO Operation called for a force of 60 vessels centered around two carriers, and 250 aircraft. However, the ensuing naval battle did not go according to plan for the Japanese; although Tulagi was seized on 3 May, the following day, aircraft from the American carrier Yorktown struck the invasion force. The element of surprise was lost due to the success of Allied codebreakers. From the Allied perspective, if Port Moresby fell, the Japanese would control the seas to the north and west of Australia, and could effectively isolate the country from its allies in North America. An Allied task force under the command of Admiral Frank Fletcher, with the carriers USS Lexington and Yorktown, was assembled to stop the Japanese advance. On 7 May, the Japanese carriers launched a full strike on a contact reported to be Allied aircraft carriers, but the report turned out to be false. The strike force found and struck only an oiler, the Neosho, and the destroyer Sims.

The American carriers also launched a strike with incomplete reconnaissance, and only located and sank the light aircraft carrier Shōhō. On 8 May, the opposing carrier forces finally found each other and exchanged air strikes. Aircraft from the two Japanese carriers succeeded in sinking the carrier Lexington and damaging the carrier Yorktown. In return, the Americans damaged Shōkaku. Although Zuikaku was left undamaged, aircraft and personnel losses to Zuikaku were heavy and the Japanese naval forces were unable to support an amphibious landing on Port Moresby. As a result, the MO Operation was canceled, and the Japanese were forced to abandon their attempts to isolate Australia.

Although they managed to sink an American carrier, the Japanese also suffered significant damage, as all three carriers that were committed to the battle would now be unavailable for the operation against Midway. After Coral Sea, the Japanese had four fleet carriers operational—Sōryū, Kaga, Akagi and Hiryū—and believed that the Americans had a maximum of two—Enterprise and Hornet. Saratoga was undergoing repair after a torpedo attack, while Yorktown had been damaged at Coral Sea and was believed by Japanese naval intelligence to have been sunk. Instead, she would sortie for Midway after just three days of repairs in Hawaii.

=== Midway ===
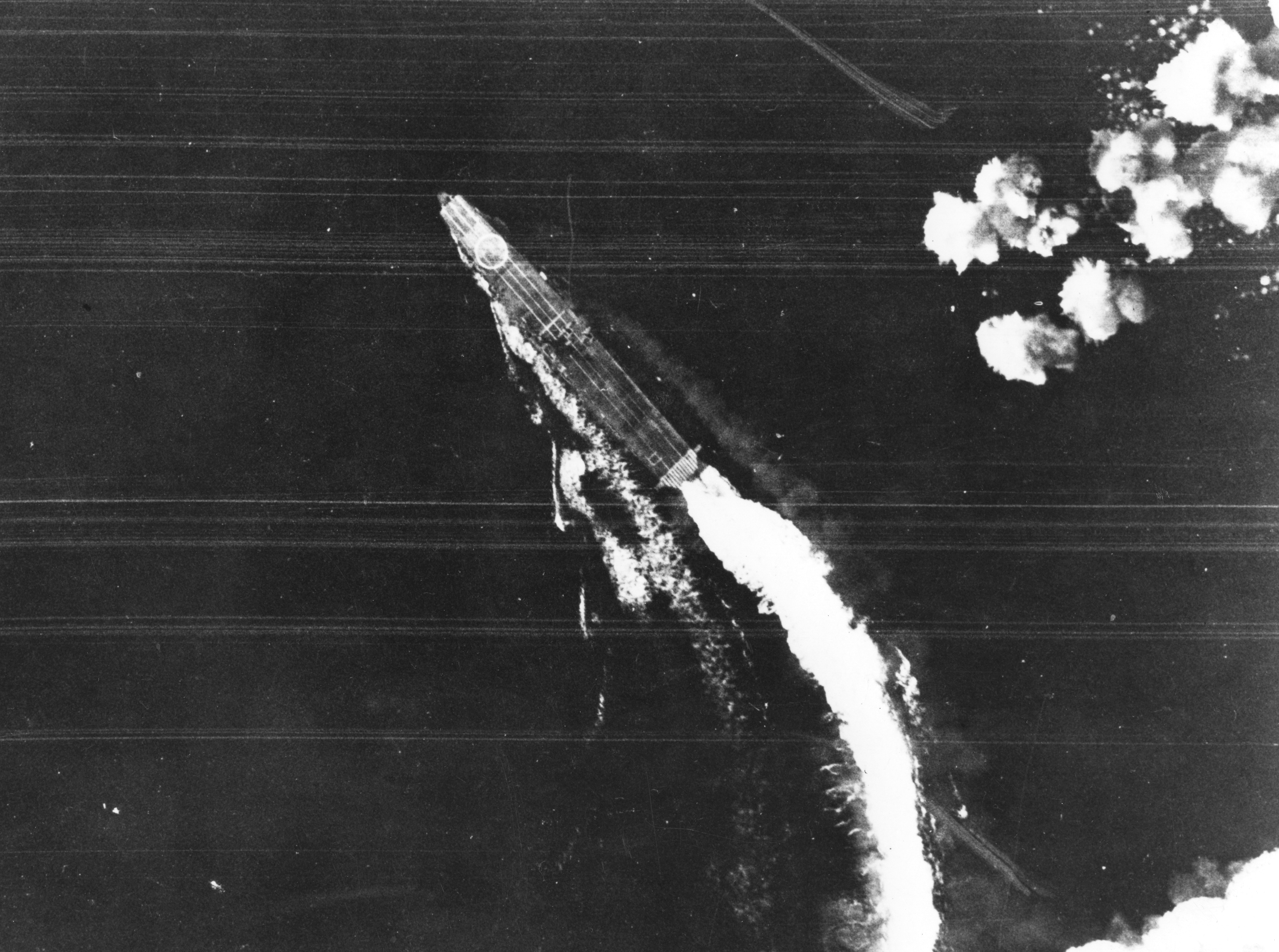
Hiryū under attack by B-17 Flying Fortress heavy bombers

Admiral Yamamoto viewed the operation against Midway as the potentially decisive battle of the war, which could lead to the destruction of American strategic power in the Pacific, and subsequently allow for a negotiated peace settlement. Through strategic and tactical surprise, the Japanese would knock out Midway's air strength and soften its defenses for a landing by 5,000 troops. After the capture of the island, the Combined Fleet planned to lay the basis for the most important part of the operation. Yamamoto hoped that the operation would lure the American surface fleet into a trap. The Japanese intended their attack on Midway to act as bait for the bulk of the US Navy's strength in the Pacific, which Japanese planners anticipated would depart Pearl Harbor in order to defend the island. When the American vessels arrived, Yamamoto intended to concentrate his scattered naval forces to defeat them. Importantly, and concurrently to their attack on Midway, the Japanese launched Operation AL, an operation to seize two islands in the Aleutians.

In May, American codebreakers discovered the planned attack on Midway. Yamamoto's complex plan contained no contingencies in the event that his fleet was found by the Americans before the Japanese had expected them. Planned surveillance of the American fleet in Pearl Harbor by long-ranged seaplanes did not occur as a result of an abortive identical operation in March. Additionally, Japanese submarine scouting lines that were supposed to be in place along the Hawaiian Islands were not ready on time.

The battle began on 3 June, when American aircraft from Midway spotted and attacked the Japanese transport group 700 miles (1,100 km) west of the atoll. On 4 June, the Japanese launched a 108-aircraft strike on the island, but failed to deliver a decisive blow to the island's facilities. American ground-based aircraft on Midway were already airborne, adding to the 116 carrier aircraft on their way to attack the Japanese. The aircraft from Midway attacked the Japanese fleet, but failed to score a single hit. In the middle of these uncoordinated attacks, a Japanese scout aircraft reported the presence of an American task force, but it was not until later that the presence of an American carrier was confirmed. Vice Admiral Chuichi Nagumo was put in a difficult tactical situation. After quick deliberation, he opted for a delayed, but better-prepared, attack on the American task force.

At 10:22am, American SBD Dauntless dive bombers surprised and attacked three of the Japanese carriers. Sōryū, Kaga, and Akagi were destroyed in short order. A single Japanese carrier, Hiryū, remained operational, and launched an immediate counterattack. Her aircraft scored hits on Yorktown and put her out of action. Later in the afternoon, aircraft from the two remaining American carriers found and destroyed Hiryū. The crippled Yorktown, along with the destroyer Hammann, were later sunk by the Japanese submarine I-168. With the striking power of the Kido Butai destroyed, Japan's offensive naval power was significantly blunted. Early on the morning of 5 June, the Japanese canceled the Midway operation.

=== New Guinea and the Solomons ===
Japanese land forces continued to advance in the Solomon Islands and the Australian-administered Territory of New Guinea. From July 1942, several Australian reserve battalions fought a stubborn rearguard action on New Guinea, delaying the Japanese advance along the Kokoda Track towards Port Moresby. These militia units were relieved in late August by troops from the Second Australian Imperial Force. In early September 1942 Japanese marines attacked a strategic Royal Australian Air Force base at Milne Bay, near the eastern tip of New Guinea. They were repulsed by Allied forces, the first defeat of the war for Japanese forces on land.

On New Guinea, the Japanese on the Kokoda Track came within sight of Port Moresby but were ordered to withdraw to the northeastern coast as fighting intensified between Japanese and Allied forces over Guadalcanal. Australian and American forces attacked the IJA's fortified positions in the north, and after more than two months of fighting in the Buna–Gona area, finally captured the key Japanese beachhead on New Guinea in early 1943.

==== Guadalcanal ====
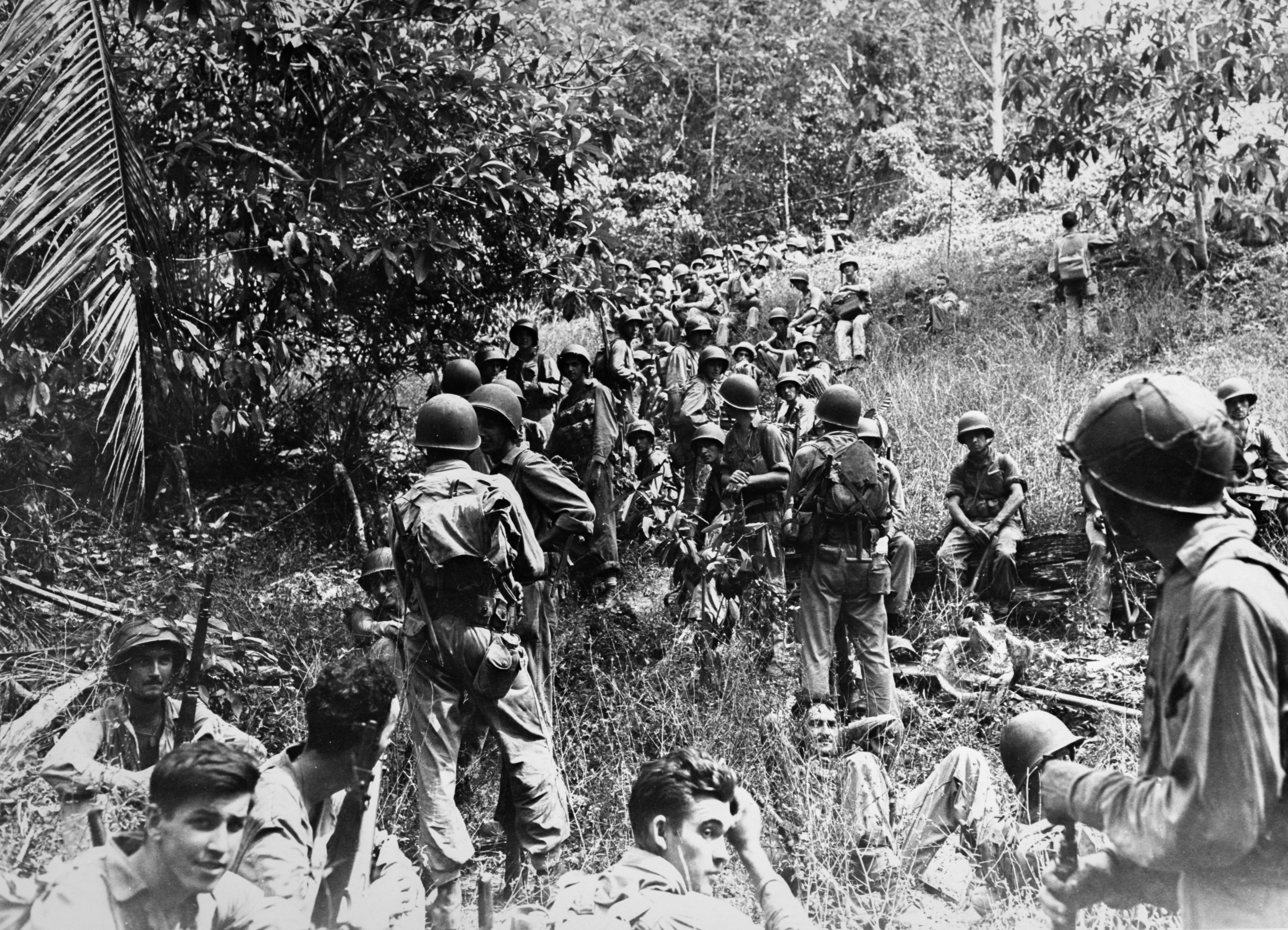
US Marines rest in the field during the Guadalcanal campaign in November 1942.

Allied forces became aware via coastwatchers of a Japanese airfield under construction at Guadalcanal in the Solomon Islands. On 7 August 1942, 16,000 US Marines landed on Guadalcanal and the island of Tulagi in the Solomons. Vice Admiral Gunichi Mikawa, commander of the newly formed IJN Eighth Fleet at Rabaul, sortied with the ships under his command to engage the Allied force off the northern coast of Guadalcanal. On the night of 8–9 August, Mikawa's ships surprised Allied naval forces in the Battle of Savo Island, sinking four Allied heavy cruisers and withdrawing with no losses. The battle was one of the worst Allied naval defeats of the war. The Japanese victory was mitigated only by Mikawa's failure to attack the Allied transport ships, which had been left vulnerable by the defeat at Savo Island. Had Mikawa done so, the American troops on Guadalcanal would have been left isolated and undersupplied, and the first American counterattack in the Pacific may have been halted. Separately, and importantly, the Japanese originally perceived the American landings in the Solomons as nothing more than a reconnaissance operation.

With Japanese and Allied forces both occupying parts of Guadalcanal, over the following six months both sides poured resources into an escalating battle of attrition over the island and its littoral zone. American ground-based aircraft at Henderson Field ensured American control of the waters around Guadalcanal during daytime, while the superior night-fighting capabilities of the IJN gave the Japanese the advantage at night. In August, Japanese and US carrier forces fought the Battle of the Eastern Solomons, resulting in the sinking of the IJN light carrier Ryūjō. In October, US forces successfully challenged the Japanese in night fighting during the Battle of Cape Esperance, sinking a Japanese cruiser and destroyer for the loss of one destroyer of their own. During the night of 13 October, Japanese battleships Kongō and Haruna bombarded Henderson Field, temporarily disabling it; the airfield was swiftly returned to service by American engineers. On 26 October, the Japanese carriers Shōkaku and Zuikaku sank the American carrier Hornet and heavily damaged Enterprise in the Battle of the Santa Cruz Islands. The loss of Hornet, coupled with the earlier loss of Wasp to the IJN submarine I-19 and heavy submarine damage to Saratoga in September, meant that US carrier strength in the region was reduced to a single vessel, the Enterprise. However, the two IJN carriers were forced to retire to home waters for repairs and aircrew replacements. From 12 to 15 November, Japanese and American surface ships engaged in night actions in the Naval Battle of Guadalcanal, one of the only two battles in the Pacific War during which battleships fought each other; two US admirals were killed and two Japanese battleships were sunk. The Japanese subsequently ceased attempts to bombard American positions on Guadalcanal from the sea.

During the campaign, most of the Japanese aircraft based in the South Pacific were redeployed to the defense of Guadalcanal. Many were lost in engagements with the Allied air forces, and the Japanese were largely unable to rescue their downed pilots in the region, subjecting their pool of experienced combat airmen to high rates of attrition.

Japanese ground forces launched repeated attacks on heavily defended American positions around Henderson Field, but were repulsed with high casualties. To sustain these offensives, resupply to IJA forces on Guadalcanal was carried out by Japanese convoys at night, termed the "Tokyo Express" by the Allies. The convoys were challenged by American naval forces with increasing intensity as the campaign wore on, and the IJA troops on Guadalcanal began to suffer from disease and malnutrition as their lines of supply from the IJN were constricted. The multiple fleet battles involving heavier ships, as well as daytime carrier battles, resulted in the waters north of Guadalcanal becoming known as "Ironbottom Sound", due to the dozens of ships from both sides that were sunk in the area. Over the course of the campaign, however, the Allies were much better able to replace their losses than the Japanese, and by late 1942 the Japanese decided to abandon Guadalcanal. The Japanese evacuated their remaining troops from the island and withdrew in February 1943. Over six months, the Japanese had committed their forces to Guadalcanal piecemeal, and had proved unable to withstand the attrition of such an protracted and intense campaign. The battle had painfully exposed the internal rifts and rivalries that divided the Japanese military regime, and frequently paralyzed its ability to craft coherent strategies and react dynamically to challenges by Allied forces.

Compared to just over 7,000 American deaths, over 25,000 Japanese soldiers died on Guadalcanal, of which 15,000 had starved to death. The Japanese had also lost a significant number of transports and experienced aircrew, valuable assets that they could not easily or quickly replace. Furthermore, the attrition on Guadalcanal drained so many Japanese resources that they were forced to cancel Operation Gogo, their planned strike into the Sichuan Basin to overthrow the Chinese Nationalist government. Victory on Guadalcanal provided a significant boost to Allied morale, and had awarded them the strategic initiative in the Pacific theater.

== Stalemate in China and Southeast Asia ==
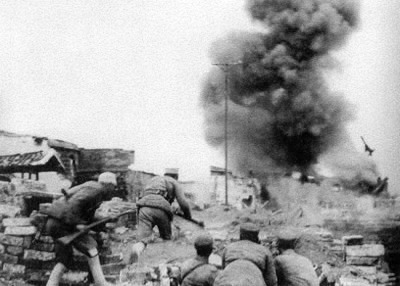
Chinese troops during the Battle of Changde in November 1943

=== China 1942–1943 ===
In early 1942 in mainland China, the Japanese 3rd, 6th, and 40th Divisions, a total of around 120,000 troops, massed at Yueyang and advanced southward in three columns, attempting again to cross the Miluo River to reach Changsha. In January 1942, Chinese forces scored a victory at Changsha, the first Allied success against Japan.

After the Doolittle Raid, the IJA conducted the Zhejiang-Jiangxi Campaign, with the goal of locating surviving American airmen, punishing the Chinese who had aided them and destroying air bases. This operation started on 15 May 1942 with 40 infantry and 15–16 artillery battalions, but was repelled by Chinese forces by September. During this campaign, the IJA engaged in biological warfare, spreading cholera, typhoid, plague and dysentery throughout Japanese-occupied areas of China. Chinese estimates put the death toll from Japanese-inflicted biological warfare at 250,000 civilians. Around 1,700 Japanese troops died, out of a total 10,000 who fell ill when Japanese biological weapons infected their own forces.

On 2 November 1943, Isamu Yokoyama, commander of the Japanese 11th Army, deployed around 100,000 troops to attack Changde. During the seven-week Battle of Changde, the Chinese forced Japan to fight a campaign of attrition. Although the Japanese captured the city, the Chinese were able to pin them down long enough for reinforcements to arrive and encircle them. The Chinese then cut Japanese supply lines, prompting the Japanese to retreat, pursued by Chinese forces. During the battle, Japan deployed chemical weapons.

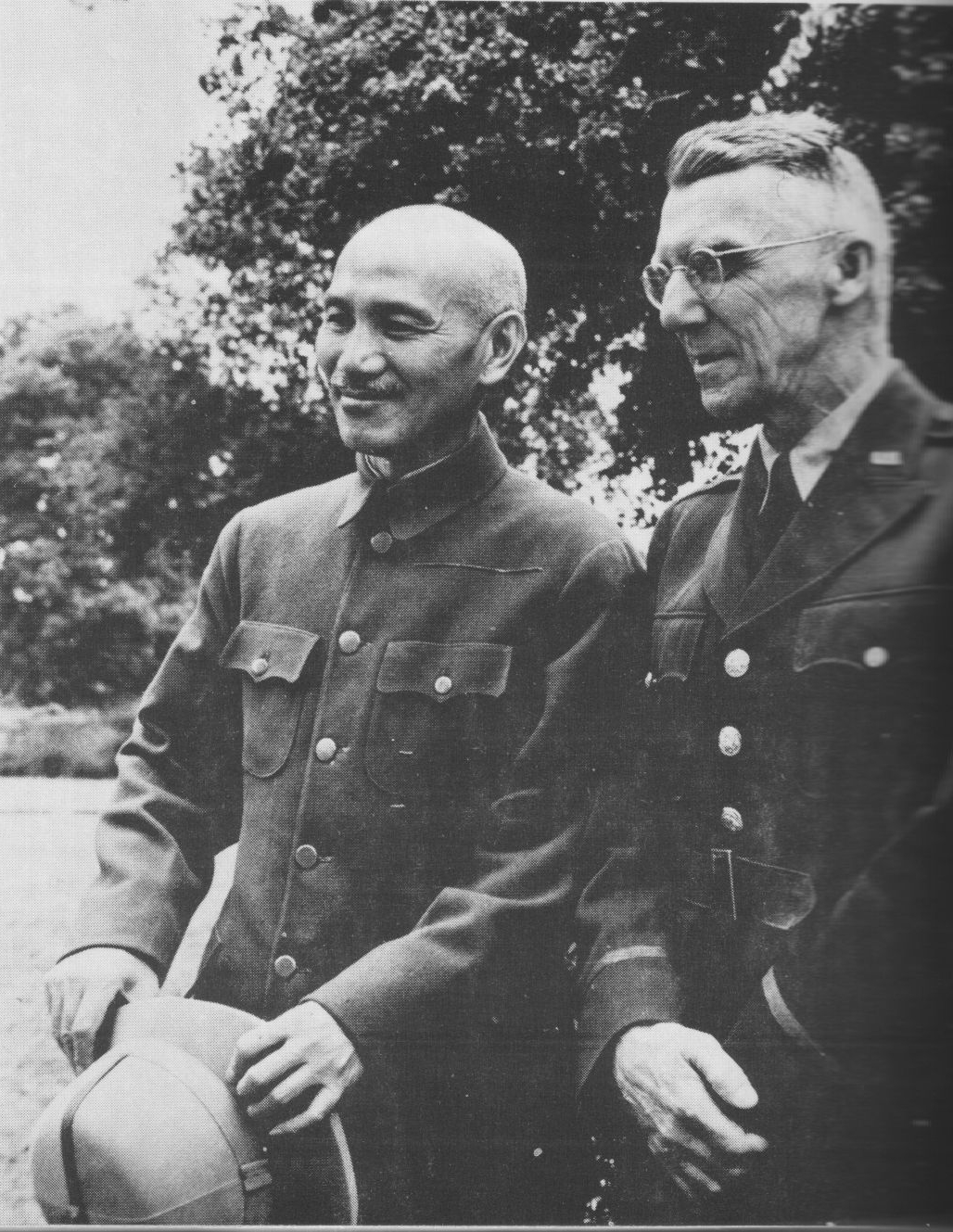
Generalissimo Chiang Kai-shek and General Joseph Stilwell, Allied Commander-in-Chief in the China theatre from 1942 to 1945

=== Burma 1942–1943 ===
In the aftermath of the Japanese conquest of Burma, there was widespread public disorder and pro-independence agitation in eastern India, as well as a famine in Bengal, causing up to 3 million deaths. Despite these difficulties, Wavell (commander-in-chief in India) was eager to mount British counterattacks into Burma.

The British subsequently initiated an offensive in Arakan intended to secure Akyab island, considered vital for its port and airfield. The 14th Indian Infantry Division advanced overland down the Mayu peninsula. The offensive was stalled at Rathedaung and Donbaik, only a few miles north of Akyab, by numerically inferior but well-fortified Japanese forces. Repeated assaults by Commonwealth forces from January to March 1942 failed to overcome these positions. A Japanese division was redeployed to Arakan from Central Burma and proceeded to attack the 14th Indian Division's exposed left flank, overrunning several units. The headquarters of the 26th Indian Infantry Division took over command of the front, and intended to conduct a counterattack, but its troops were exhausted and the division was forced to fall back to the Indian frontier in the first week in May.

Most British officers accepted that the failure resulted from inadequate training for jungle warfare. To offset the results of the Arakan offensive, the Allies widely publicized a long distance raid mounted by the Chindits under Brigadier Orde Charles Wingate. The raid itself was a mixed success; the Chindits suffered heavy losses (1,138 out of a force of just over 3,000) and inflicted only minor damage to the Japanese lines of communication. Wingate insisted that ordinary British and Indian troops could fight in the jungle as easily as the Japanese. The raid also contributed to the Japanese decision to invade India during 1944.

In August 1943 the Allies formed a new South East Asia Command (SEAC) to take over strategic responsibilities for Burma and India from the Commander-in-Chief, India, who headed the British Indian Army. In October 1943 Winston Churchill appointed Admiral Lord Louis Mountbatten as its Supreme Commander. Wavell was appointed Viceroy of India and immediately took measures to address the famine in Bengal. General Claude Auchinleck became commander in chief of the Indian Army and restructured its administration and training departments. The British and Indian Fourteenth Army was formed to face the Japanese in Burma. Under Lieutenant General William Slim, its training, morale and health greatly improved. The American General Joseph Stilwell, who commanded US forces in the China Burma India Theater, directed aid to China and prepared to construct the Ledo Road to link India and China.

In 1943, the Thai Phayap Army invasion headed to Xishuangbanna in China, but were driven back by the Chinese Expeditionary Force.

== Allied offensives, 1943–1944 ==
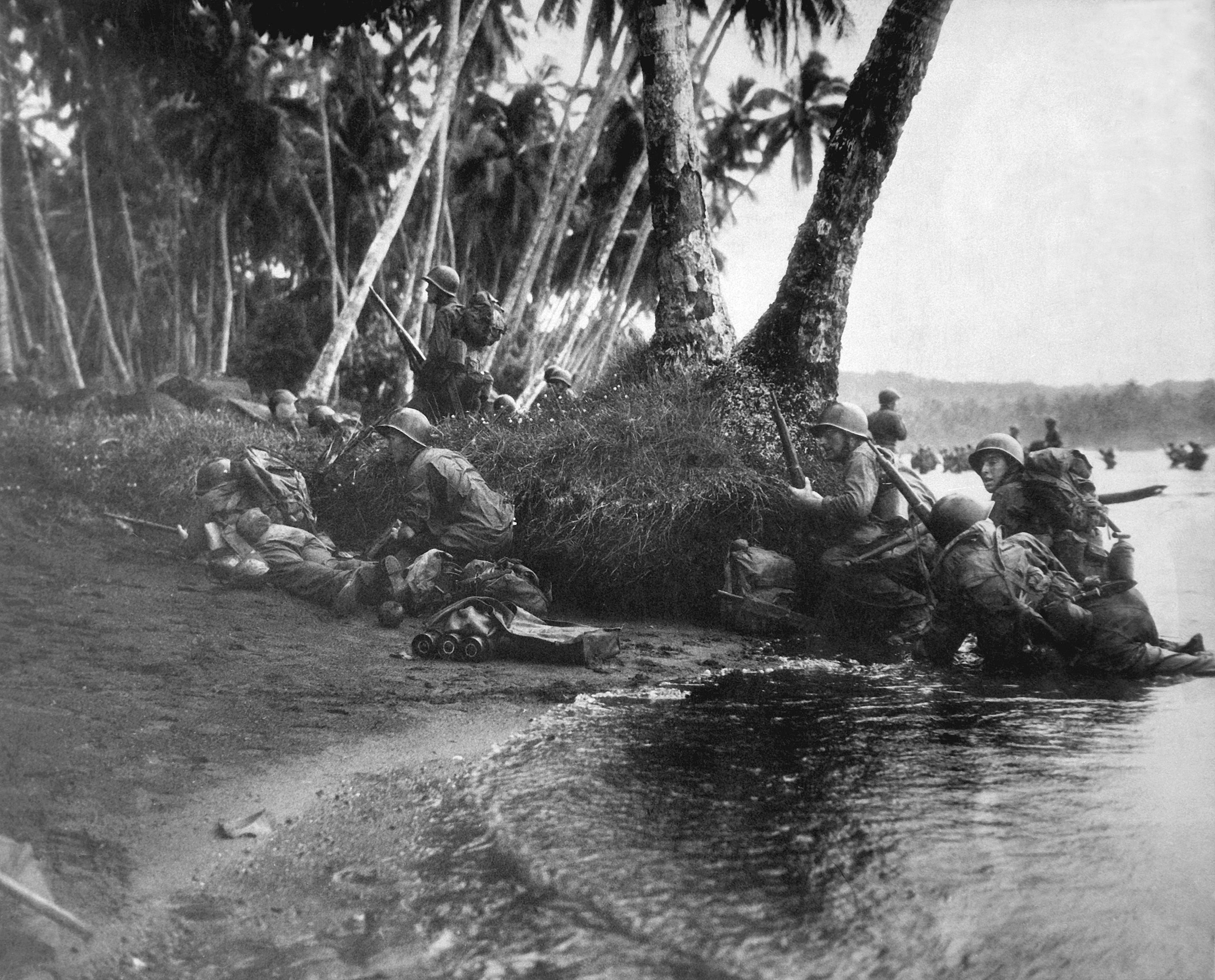
American forces landing at Rendova Island, June 1943

After Midway, the US began to harness its vast industrial potential to greatly increase production of ships, planes, and other materiel, and to train more airmen at an increasing rate. At the same time, Japan, lacking an adequate industrial base, coherent technological strategy, comprehensive aircrew training program or adequate naval resources and commerce defense, began to fall behind. The Allies began a protracted offensive campaign across the Pacific theater, seizing several island bases in a series of (often bloody) amphibious assaults against determined Japanese defenders. Some Japanese strongholds like Truk, Rabaul, and Formosa, were neutralized by air attack and bypassed. The goal was to get close to Japan itself, then launch massive strategic air attacks, improve the submarine blockade, and finally (only if necessary) execute an invasion.

The US Navy did not seek out the Japanese fleet for a decisive battle. The Allied advance could only be stopped by a Japanese naval attack, which increasing oil shortages (induced by submarine attack) were rendering increasingly impossible.

=== Allied offensives on New Guinea and up the Solomons ===
In June 1943, the Allies launched Operation Cartwheel, a series of amphibious invasions to recapture the Solomon Islands and New Guinea, and ultimately isolate the major Japanese forward base at Rabaul. Following the Japanese invasion of Salamaua–Lae in March 1942, Cartwheel began with the Salamaua–Lae campaign in Northern New Guinea in April 1943, which was followed in June to October by the New Georgia campaign, in which the Allies used the Landings on Rendova, as well as the Drive on Munda Point and accompanying Battle of Munda Point to secure a secretly constructed Japanese airfield at Munda and the rest of New Georgia Islands group. Landings from September until December secured the Treasury Islands and landed Allied troops on Choiseul, Bougainville and Cape Gloucester.

These landings prepared the way for Chester W. Nimitz's island-hopping campaign towards Japan.

=== Invasion of the Gilbert and Marshall Islands ===
The Allied leaders of the Asian and Pacific Theaters: Generalissimo Chiang Kai-shek, Franklin D. Roosevelt, and Winston Churchill meeting at the Cairo Conference in 1943

In November 1943, US Marine forces sustained high casualties when they overwhelmed the 4,500-strong Japanese garrison at Tarawa Atoll. This experience drove the Allies to improve their techniques of amphibious landings, implementing changes such as thorough pre-emptive aerial bombings and shore bombardment, more careful planning regarding tides and landing schedules, and better unit coordination. Operations in the Gilbert Islands were followed in late-January and mid-February 1944 by further, but less costly, landings on the Marshall Islands.

=== Cairo Conference ===
On 22 November 1943, US President Franklin D. Roosevelt, British Prime Minister Winston Churchill, and ROC Generalissimo Chiang Kai-shek met in Cairo, Egypt, to discuss a strategy to defeat Japan. The meeting was also known as the Cairo Conference and concluded with the Cairo Declaration.

=== Submarine warfare ===
Throughout the war, American, British, and Dutch submarines operated out of bases at Cavite in the Philippines (1941–1942), Fremantle and Brisbane in Australia, Pearl Harbor, Trincomalee in Ceylon, Midway, and later Guam. Allied submarine forces played a major role in defeating Japan, even though submarines made up only a small proportion of the Allied navies—less than two percent in the case of the US Navy. Submarines strangled Japanese commercial and military shipping, inflicting severe damage on its merchant fleet, intercepting many troop transports, and cutting off nearly all the oil imports essential to weapons production and military operations. In particular, the fuel situation grew so acute that before the Battle of Leyte Gulf in late 1944, Japanese naval strategists were uncertain that the attacking IJN fleet would have the ability to withdraw to safety regardless of the battle's outcome. By early 1945, Japanese oil supplies were so limited that the remaining IJN fleet was virtually stranded in their anchorages.

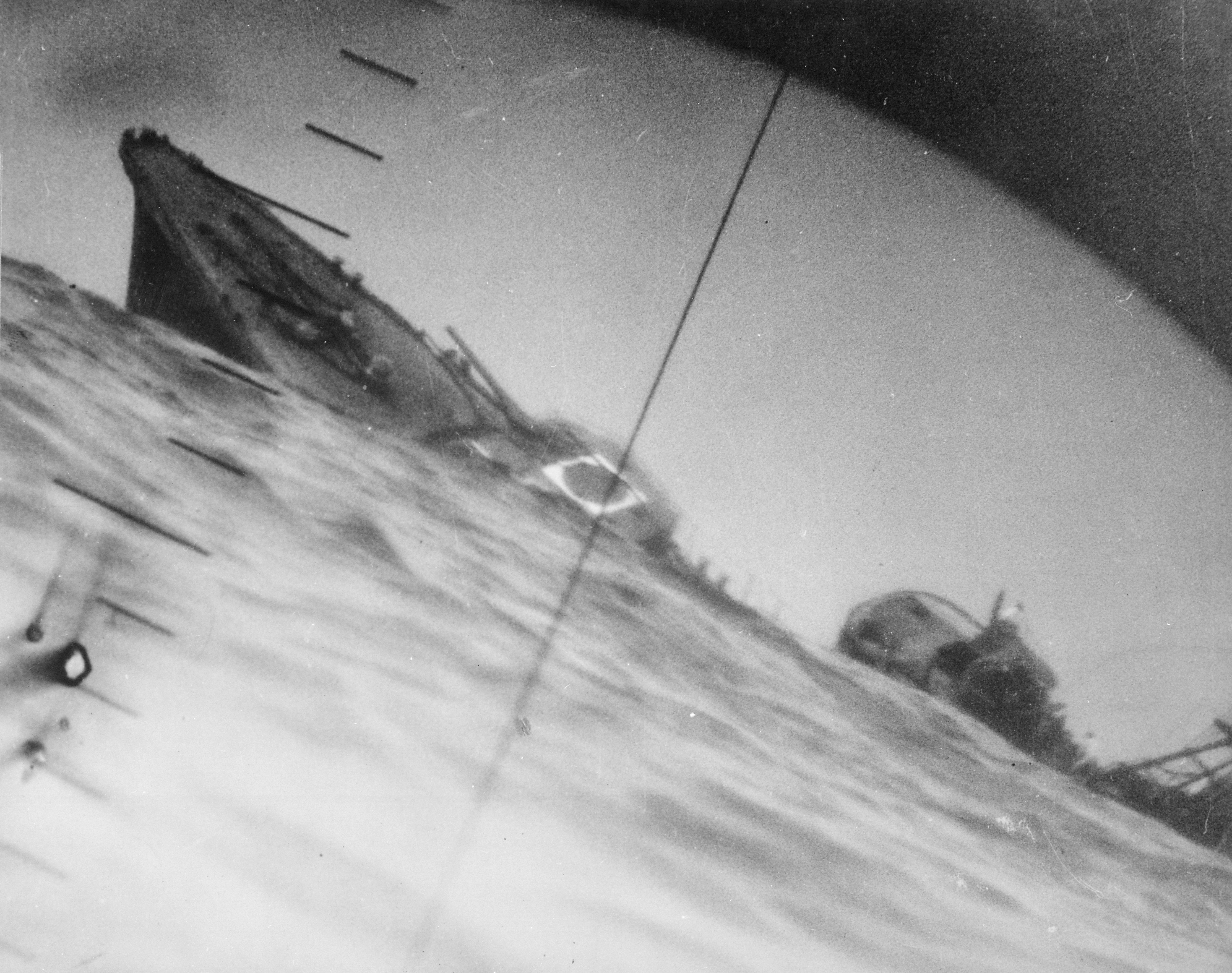
The torpedoed Yamakaze, as seen through the periscope of an American submarine, Nautilus, in June 1942

The Japanese military claimed to have sunk 468 Allied submarines during the war. In reality, only 42 American submarines were sunk in the Pacific due to hostile action, with 10 others lost to accidents or friendly fire. The Dutch lost five submarines to Japanese attacks or minefields, and the British lost three.

American submarines accounted for 56% of the Japanese merchantmen sunk; mines or air attack destroyed most of the rest. American submariners also claimed 28% of all Japanese warships destroyed. In addition, submarines played important reconnaissance roles and rescued hundreds of downed fliers.

Within hours of Pearl Harbor, in retribution against Japan, Roosevelt promulgated a new doctrine: unrestricted submarine warfare against Japanese shipping. This meant sinking any warship, commercial vessel, or passenger ship in Japanese-controlled waters, unexpectedly and without aiding survivors. (Note: The US thereby reversed its opposition to unrestricted submarine warfare. After the war, when moralistic doubts about Hiroshima and other raids on civilian targets were loudly voiced, no one criticized Roosevelt's submarine policy. (Two German admirals, Erich Raeder and Karl Dönitz, faced charges at the Nuremberg War Crimes Trials of violating international law through unrestricted submarine warfare; the court acquitted them after they proved that Allied merchant ships were legitimate military targets under the rules in force at the time.)) The United States had a long supply line, leaving it vulnerable to submarine attack, but Japan utilized its submarines primarily for long-range reconnaissance, only occasionally attacking US supply lines.

As the war turned against Japan, IJN submarines increasingly served to resupply island strongholds that had been cut off, such as Truk and Rabaul. In addition, Japan honored its neutrality treaty with the Soviet Union and ignored American freighters shipping military supplies from San Francisco to Vladivostok, much to the consternation of its German ally.

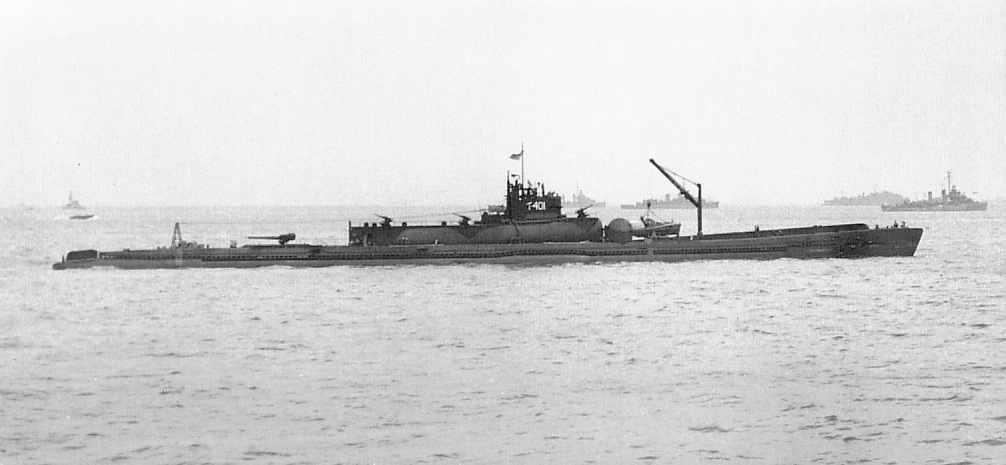
The I-400 class, the largest non-nuclear submarines ever constructed

American submarines, by contrast, engaged in extensive commerce raiding from the outset of hostilities. However, the problem of Allied forces surrounded in the Philippines in early 1942 led to diversion of submarines to "guerrilla submarine" missions. Basing in Australia placed boats under Japanese aerial threat while en route to patrol areas, reducing their effectiveness, and Nimitz relied on submarines for close surveillance of Japanese bases. The standard-issue Mark 14 torpedo and its Mark VI exploder both proved defective and were not corrected until September 1943. Before the war, a US Customs officer had seized a copy of the Japanese merchant marine code, not knowing that the Office of Naval Intelligence had broken it. The Japanese promptly changed it, and the new code was not broken again by OP-20-G until 1943.

In 1944 the US Navy restructured its submarine fleet, installing effective shipboard radar on its 150 submarines, replacing commanders that were deemed not aggressive enough, and fixing design flaws in the torpedoes. Japanese commerce protection was "shiftless beyond description", (Note: Chihaya went on to note that when the IJN belatedly improved its ASW methods, the US submarine force responded by increasing Japanese losses.) and Japanese convoys were poorly organized and defended compared to those of the Allies. The number of American submarine patrols (and sinkings) rose steeply as the war progressed: 350 patrols (180 ships sunk) in 1942, 350 (335) in 1943, and 520 (603) in 1944. By 1945, sinkings of Japanese vessels had decreased because there were so few ships left to target at all. In sum, Allied submarines destroyed 1,200 Japanese merchant ships – about five million tons of shipping. At critical stages of the Guadalcanal, Saipan, and Leyte campaigns, thousands of Japanese troops were killed or diverted from where they were needed due to the actions or threat of submarine attack. Over 200 IJN warships were sunk, including a battleship and no fewer than eight carriers.

Underwater warfare was especially dangerous; of the 16,000 Americans who went out on submarine patrol, 3,500 (22%) never returned, the highest casualty rate of any American force in World War II. The Japanese losses, 130 submarines in all, were even higher.

== Japanese offensives in Asia, 1944 ==
=== Japanese counteroffensives in China, 1944 ===
In mid-1944, Japan marshalled over 500,000 troops in China and launched its largest ground offensive of the war, codenamed Operation Ichi-Go. The goal of the offensive was to connect Japanese-controlled territory in China and French Indochina by land, in part to alleviate the catastrophic losses suffered by Japanese merchant shipping, as well as to capture airbases in southeastern China where American bombers were based. Though Japan suffered about 100,000 casualties, it gained significant territory in China before Ichi-Go ground to a halt near Guangxi. Despite major tactical victories, the operation overall failed to provide Japan any significant strategic gains. A majority of the Chinese forces involved in the battle were able to retreat out of the area and would later return to attack Japanese positions at the Battle of West Hunan. Japanese losses in the Pacific meant that Japan was unable to accrue the time and resources needed to achieve victory over China. Operation Ichi-Go created a sense of social confusion in the areas of China that it affected. Chinese Communist guerrillas were able to exploit this confusion to expand their influence and gain control of greater areas of the countryside in the aftermath of the fighting.

=== Japanese offensive in India, 1944 ===
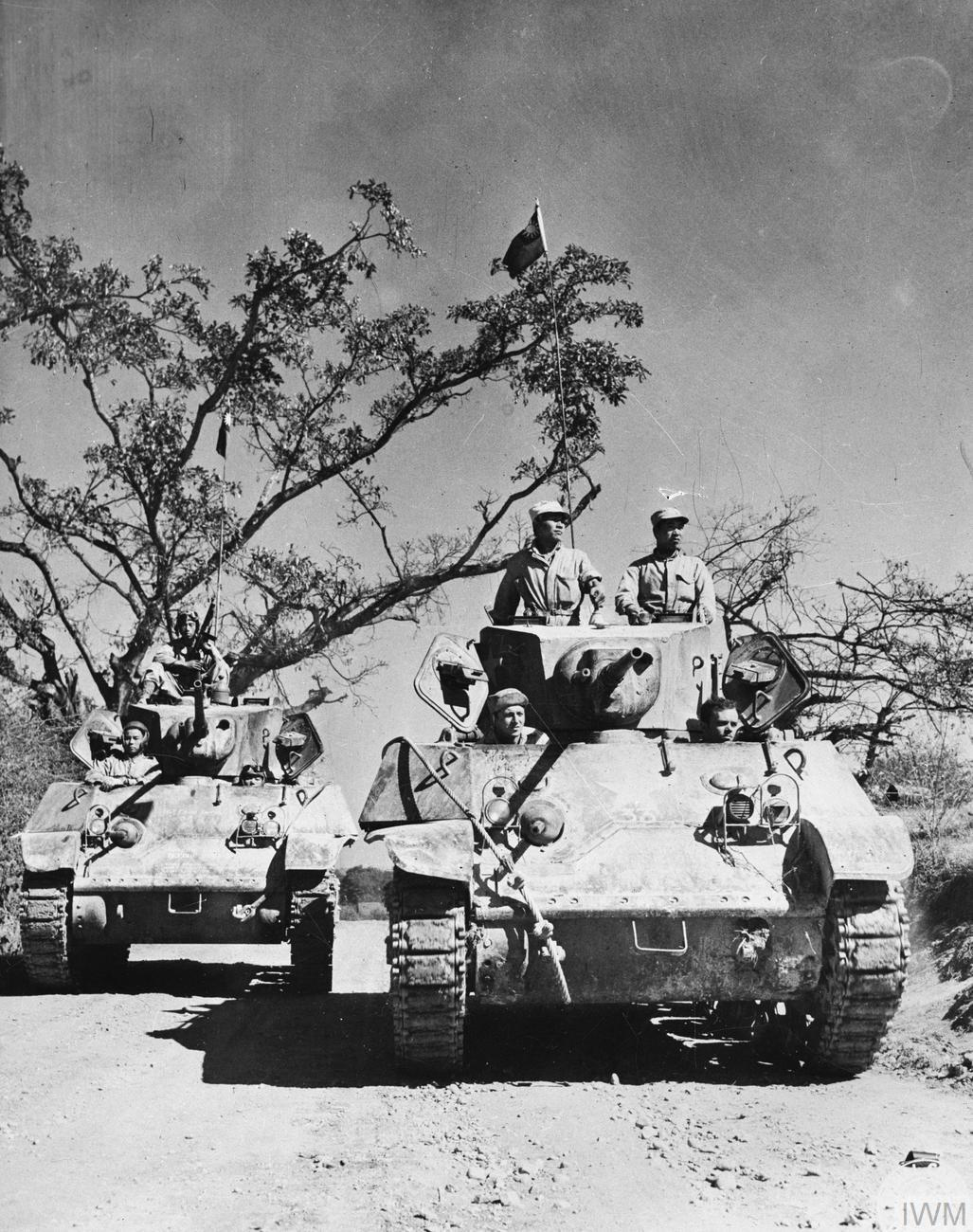
Chinese forces on M3A3 Stuart tanks on the Ledo Road

After the Allied setbacks in 1943, the Southeast Asia command prepared to launch offensives into Burma on several fronts. In early 1944, the Chinese and American troops of the Northern Combat Area Command (NCAC), commanded by the American general Joseph Stilwell, began extending the Ledo Road from India into northern Burma, while the Indian XV Corps began an advance along the coast in Arakan Province. In February 1944, the Japanese mounted a local counter-attack in Arakan. After early Japanese success, this counterattack was defeated in the Battle of the Admin Box when the isolated Indian divisions of XV Corps repelled a concerted Japanese assault, relying on supplies dropped by parachute.

The Japanese launched a long-planned offensive, advocated by Lieutenant General Renya Mutaguchi and codenamed Operation U-Go, into India in mid-March 1944. Lieutenant General Slim, commanding Fourteenth Army, and his forward commander, Lieutenant General Geoffry Scoones, planned to withdraw into the Imphal plain and force the Japanese to fight with their communications stretching over miles of primitive jungle trails. However, they were slow to respond when the Japanese attack commenced and did not foresee several Japanese objectives. Some British and Indian units had to fight their way out of encirclement, but by early April Commonwealth forces had concentrated around Imphal. Several units were flown from the Arakan to reinforce them. A Japanese division that had advanced to Kohima in Nagaland cut the main road to Imphal and isolated a small British garrison, but failed to break through Kohima's defenses. During April, the Japanese attacks against Imphal itself failed, while fresh Allied formations relieved the garrison of Kohima and drove the Japanese from the positions they had captured on the Kohima ridge.

As many Japanese military planners had feared, their inadequate lines of communication and the failure of Mutaguchi's gamble on an early victory meant that their troops began to starve. Once the monsoon rains descended in mid-May, IJA troops also began succumbing to disease in large numbers. During May, while Mutaguchi continued to order attacks, the Allies advanced southwards from Kohima and northwards from Imphal. The two Allied attacks met on 22 June, breaking the Japanese siege of Imphal. The Japanese finally broke off the operation on 3 July. They had lost over 50,000 troops, mainly to starvation and disease—the worst defeat suffered by the IJA to that date.

Although the advance in Arakan had been halted to make troops and aircraft available for the Battle of Imphal, the Americans and Chinese had continued to advance in northern Burma, aided by reinforced Chindit units operating against Japanese lines of communication. In mid-1944, the Chinese Expeditionary Force invaded northern Burma, capturing a fortified position at Mount Song. By the time campaigning ceased during the monsoon, the Northern Combat Area Command had secured a vital airfield at Myitkyina after a prolonged siege, which eased the problems of air resupply from India to China over "The Hump".

== Beginning of the end in the Pacific, 1944 ==
In May 1943, the Japanese prepared Operation Z or the Z Plan, which envisioned utilizing Japanese naval power to counter American forces threatening the outer defense perimeter line, which ran from the Aleutians down through Wake, the Marshall and Gilbert Islands, Nauru, the Bismarck Archipelago, New Guinea, and then westward past Java and Sumatra to Burma. In 1943–1944, Allied forces in the Solomons began driving relentlessly toward Rabaul, eventually encircling and neutralizing the stronghold while leaving it in Japanese hands. With their position in the Solomons disintegrating, the Japanese modified the Z Plan by eliminating the Gilbert and Marshall Islands, as well as the Bismarck Archipelago, as vital areas to be defended as part of their outer perimeter. Japanese planners instead focused on the defense of a smaller inner perimeter, which included the Marianas, Palau, Western New Guinea, and the Dutch East Indies. Meanwhile, in the Central Pacific, the Americans initiated a major offensive, beginning in November 1943 with landings in the Gilbert Islands. Japanese garrisons in the Gilberts, and then the Marshalls, were methodically seized via amphibious assault. The Japanese strategy of holding overextended island garrisons had proven impossible to accomplish in practice.

In February 1944, during Operation Hailstone, the US Navy's fast carrier task force carried out a series of large-scale air raids on the major IJN naval base at Truk. Although the Japanese had moved their major vessels out in time to avoid being caught at anchor in the atoll, two days of Allied air attacks still resulted in significant losses to Japanese aircraft and merchant shipping. The Japanese navy was forced to abandon Truk as a primary anchorage and was now unable to effectively counter the Americans on any front along the perimeter. Consequently, the Japanese decided to husband their remaining naval strength for what they hoped would be a decisive battle at sea in the near future. Accordingly, the Japanese then developed a new plan, known as A-GO: a decisive fleet action that would be fought somewhere from the Palaus to the Western Carolines. It was in this area that the newly formed Mobile Fleet, along with large numbers of land-based aircraft, would be concentrated. A-GO envisioned land-based aircraft operating from airfields on islands in the defense perimeter, carrying out a first wave of attacks against the American fleet wherever along the perimeter it appeared. Once the location along the perimeter of the attacking American vessels had been determined, A-GO called for the IJN's Mobile Fleet to intercept, engage, and destroy it, supported by land-based airpower.

=== Marianas and Palaus ===
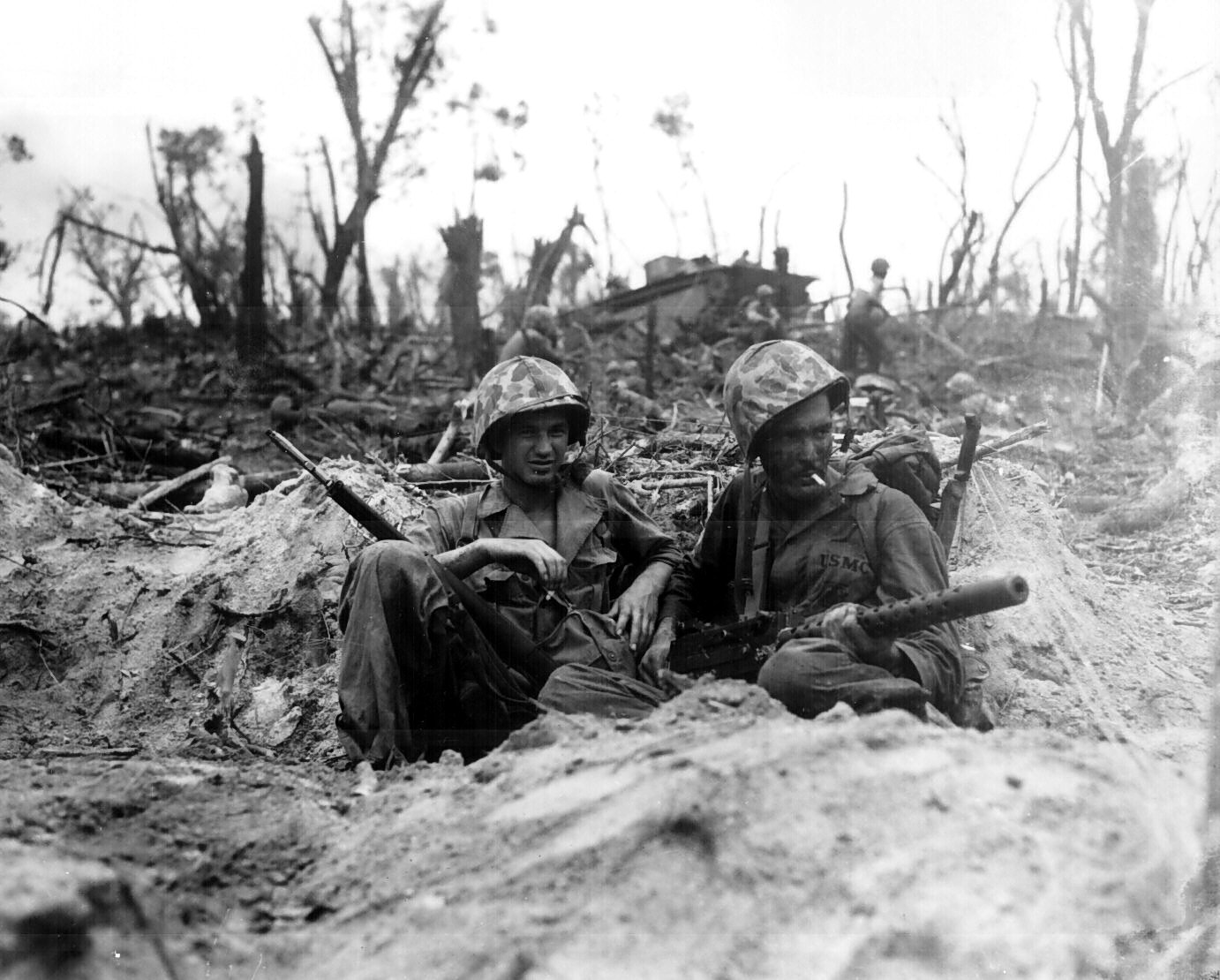
US Marines during mopping up operations on Peleliu, September 1944

On 12 March 1944, the US Joint Chiefs of Staff ordered the seizure of the Northern Marianas, with a target date of 15 June. All forces for the Marianas operation—535 warships and auxiliaries together with a ground force of over 127,500 troops—were to be commanded by Admiral Raymond A. Spruance. For the Americans, securing the Marianas would disrupt the movement of Japanese airpower to and from the southern Pacific, allow for the construction of advance naval bases closer to Japan, and provide airfields from which B-29 bombers could reach the Japanese Home Islands. Seizing the Marianas would also offer American commanders several possible objectives for the next phase of operations, which would keep the Japanese uncertain and hinder their defensive preparations. It was also hoped that a penetration of the Japanese inner defense zone might provoke the Japanese fleet to sail out in strength for a decisive engagement, offering the opportunity to cripple the Japanese navy in a single battle. The ability to plan and execute such a complex operation in the space of 90 days was indicative of the high degree of logistical and operational superiority that Allied strategists enjoyed over their Japanese counterparts at this stage of the war.

On 15 June, the 2nd and 4th Marine Divisions landed on the island of Saipan, supported by naval bombardment. However, Japanese resistance on shore was intense, and the first day's objective was not reached until D+3. Despite fanatical Japanese opposition and some desperate fighting, the Marines captured Aslito airfield on 18 June. Nafutan, Saipan's southern point, was secured on 27 June. In the north, Mount Tapotchau, the highest point on the island, was also taken on 27 June. The Marines then steadily advanced northward. On the night of 6–7 July, three to four thousand Japanese carried out a massed banzai charge that penetrated American lines near Tanapag before being repulsed. Following this attack, hundreds of civilians on Saipan committed mass suicide, most of whom were Japanese colonists, often at the instigation of fanatical IJA troops. By 9 July, organized Japanese resistance on Saipan had ceased. The U.S. Marines reached the northernmost tip of Saipan, Marpi Point, twenty-four days after the landing. Only isolated groups of hidden Japanese holdouts remained.

A month after the invasion of Saipan, the US recaptured Guam and captured Tinian, just south of Saipan. Saipan and Tinian were used extensively by the US military, as they finally placed mainland Japan within the round-trip range of American B-29 bombers. Japanese air units attacked the bases on Saipan and Tinian intermittently from November 1944 to January 1945. Until the end of the war, the United States Army Air Forces based out of these islands conducted an intense strategic bombing campaign against Japanese cities of military and industrial importance, including Tokyo, Nagoya, Osaka, and Kobe.

The invasion of Peleliu in the Palau Islands on 15 September was notable for a drastic change in Japanese defensive tactics, resulting in the highest casualty rate among US forces in an amphibious operation during the Pacific War. In a departure from the Japanese strategy in previous island battles such as Tarawa and Saipan, where defending IJA troops intensely contested the landing beaches but not the island interior, on Peleliu the Japanese constructed extensive fortifications within the ridges that dominated the center of the island. This was an example of fukkaku, or honeycomb, tactics that Japanese island garrisons would again utilize during the battles of Iwo Jima and Okinawa in 1945. Instead of the predicted four days, it took over two months and over 10,000 casualties for American forces to secure the island. The strategic value of the landings is still contested.

=== Philippine Sea ===
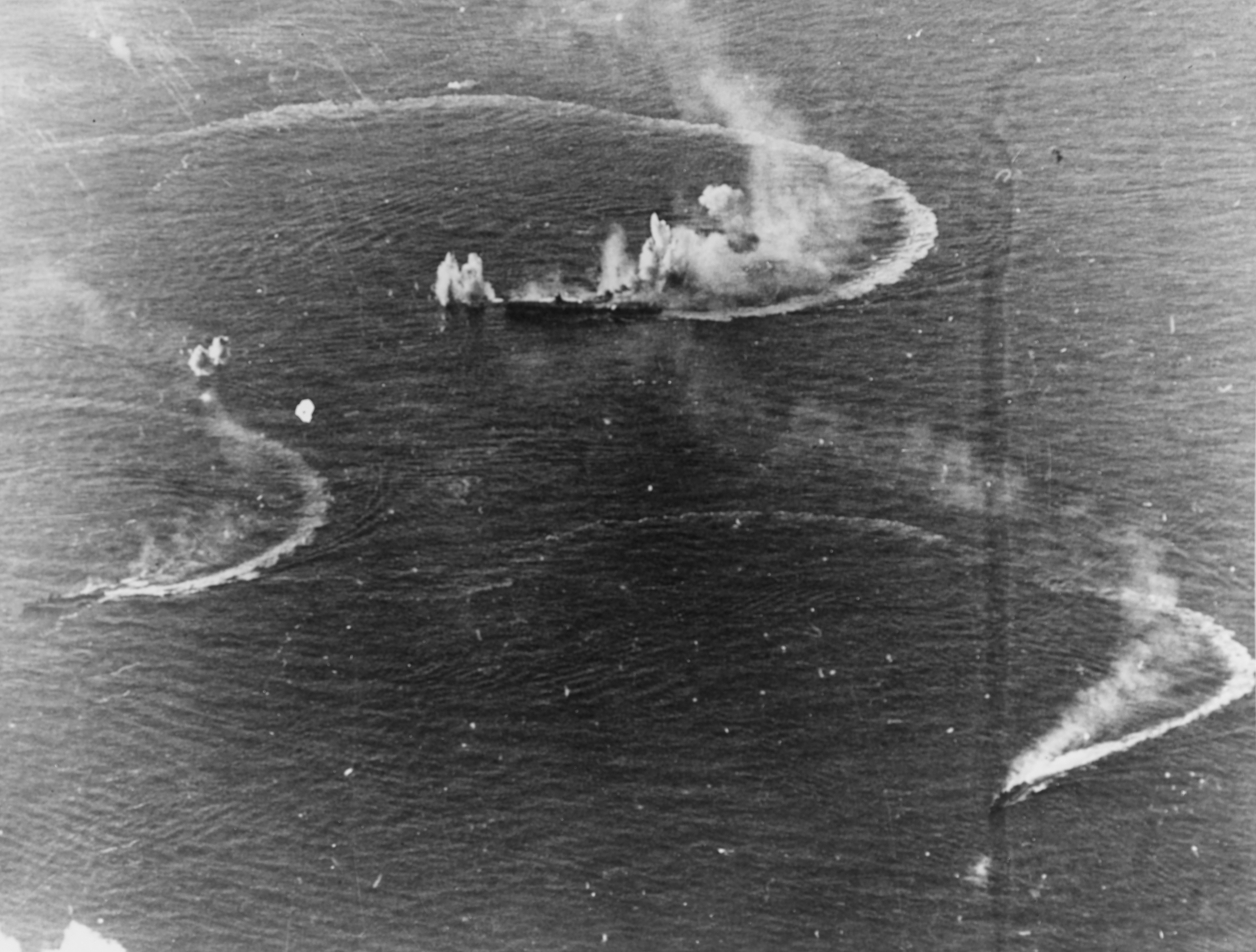
The Japanese aircraft carrier Zuikaku and two destroyers under attack in the Battle of the Philippine Sea

When the Americans landed on Saipan in the Marianas, the Japanese viewed holding the island as imperative and initiated plan A-GO. The Japanese navy deployed its largest carrier force of the war for the forthcoming battle: the nine-carrier Mobile Fleet under Vice Admiral Jisaburō Ozawa, supplemented by 500 land-based aircraft. Facing them was US Fifth Fleet under Admiral Raymond A. Spruance: 15 fleet carriers and 956 aircraft. The clash was the largest carrier battle in history.

On 19 June, a series of Japanese carrier air strikes on the Fifth Fleet were shattered by strong American defenses. The lopsided engagement was later dubbed the Great Marianas Turkey Shoot, a testament to the catastrophic losses suffered by Japanese carrier aircrew in the battle. All US carriers had combat-information centers, which interpreted the flow of radar data and radioed interception orders to the combat air patrols. The few Japanese planes that made it through patrolling American fighters and reached the Fifth Fleet did so in a staggered sequence, only to encounter massed anti-aircraft fire with proximity fuses. Only one American warship was slightly damaged. On the same day, Shōkaku was hit by four torpedoes from the submarine Cavalla and sank with heavy loss of life. The Taihō was also sunk by a single torpedo from the submarine Albacore. The next day, on 20 June, the Japanese carrier force was subjected to sustained American carrier air attacks and suffered the loss of the carrier Hiyō. The four Japanese carrier air strikes involved 373 aircraft, of which 130 returned. Many of these survivors were subsequently lost when Taihō and Shōkaku were sunk by American submarine attacks. After the second day of the battle, Japanese losses totaled three carriers and 445 aircrew, along with more than 433 carrier aircraft and around 200 land-based aircraft. The Americans lost 130 aircraft and 76 aircrew, with many due to aircraft running out of fuel returning to their carriers at night.

Although the Japanese defeat at the Philippine Sea was severe in terms of the loss of the three fleet carriers, the more significant impact on Japan's war effort was the evisceration of the IJN's carrier air groups. The IJN had spent the better part of a year reconstituting its carrier air arm, and the Americans had destroyed 90% of it in two days. The Japanese had only enough pilots left to form an air group for a single light carrier. The Mobile Fleet returned home with only 35 aircraft of the 430 that it had embarked with. The battle ended in a comprehensive Japanese defeat and virtually erased the IJN's ability to project airpower at sea.

=== Leyte Gulf, 1944 ===
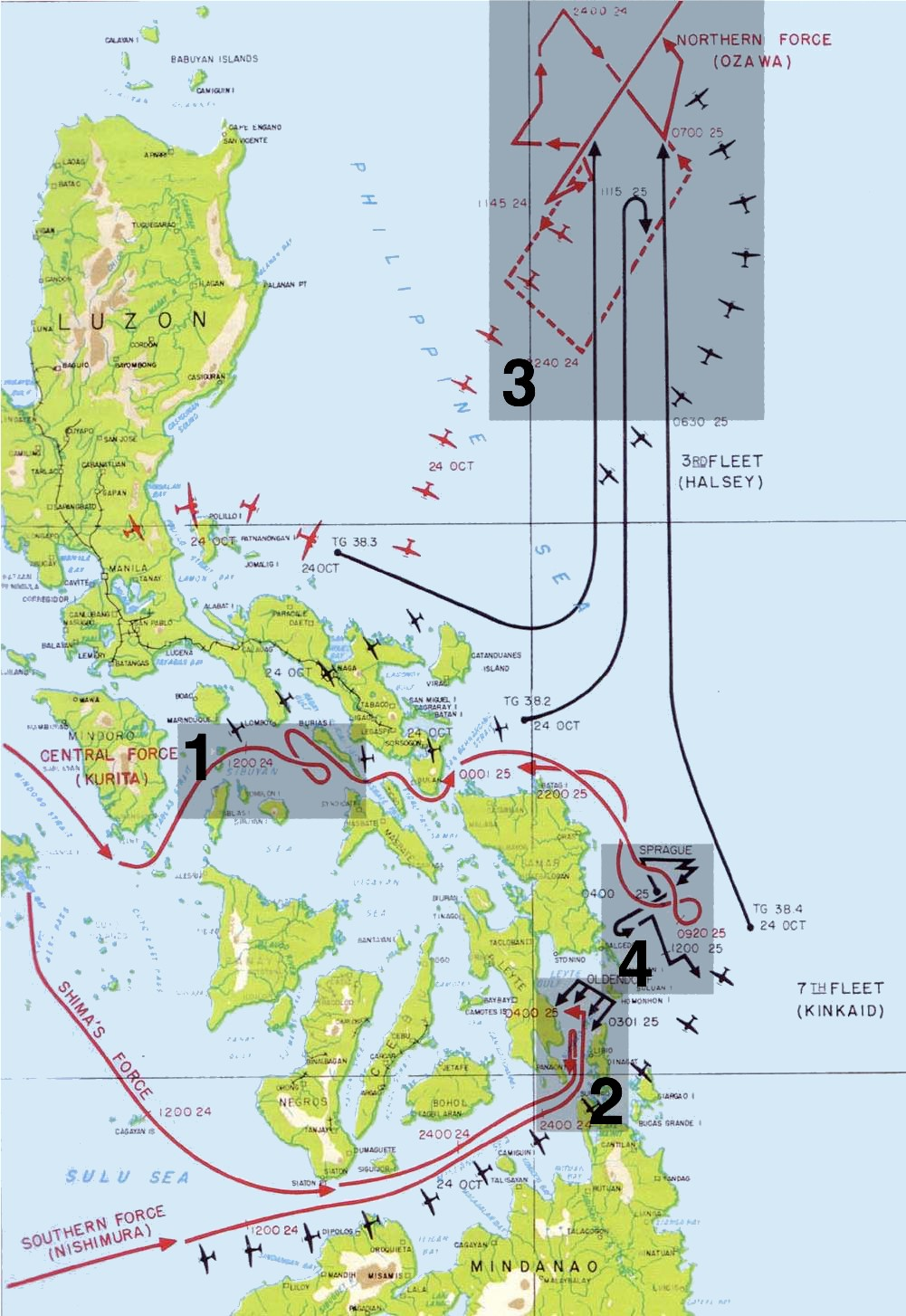
The four engagements in the Battle of Leyte Gulf

The loss at the Philippine Sea left the Japanese with two options: either launch an all-out offensive employing the IJN's remaining surface vessels against the next American amphibious landing or allow the Americans to cut the sea lanes between the Home Islands and Southeast Asia. The Japanese opted for the former and sought to utilize their last remaining strength – the firepower of their heavy cruisers and battleships – against the American beachhead at Leyte in the Philippine Islands in October 1944. The Japanese planned to use their remaining carriers as bait to lure the American carriers away from Leyte Gulf long enough for heavy warships to enter and to destroy any American ships present.

The Japanese assembled four carriers, nine battleships, 14 heavy cruisers, seven light cruisers, and 35 destroyers for this operation. These forces were split into three formations: the "Center Force", under the command of Vice Admiral Takeo Kurita, which included the battleships Yamato and Musashi; the "Northern Force", under the command of Ozawa, which had four carriers and two battleships partly converted to carriers, but was largely bereft of planes; and the "Southern Force", containing one group of battleships, cruisers and destroyers under the command of Shōji Nishimura and another under Kiyohide Shima. The Center Force would pass through the San Bernardino Strait into the Philippine Sea, turn southwards, and then attack the transports at anchor near the American beachhead on Leyte. The Southern Force would strike at the beachhead littoral through the Surigao Strait, while the Northern Force would lure the main American covering forces away from Leyte. Functioning as a decoy, Ozawa's carriers embarked just 108 aircraft.

However, after the Center Force departed from Brunei Bay on 23 October, two American submarines attacked it, resulting in the loss of two heavy cruisers with another crippled. After entering the Sibuyan Sea on 24 October, Center Force was again waylaid by American carrier aircraft, forcing another heavy cruiser to retire. The Americans then sank Musashi. Many other ships of Center Force were also attacked but continued on. Convinced that their attacks had rendered the Center Force ineffective and that it had turned back, the American carriers sailed north to address the newly detected threat of Ozawa's Northern Force and its carriers. On the night of 24–25 October, the Southern Force under Nishimura attempted to enter Leyte Gulf from the south through Surigao Strait, where an American-Australian force led by Rear Admiral Jesse Oldendorf ambushed the Japanese. American destroyers and naval gunfire destroyed two battleships and three destroyers, with only a single Japanese destroyer surviving. As a result of observing radio silence, Shima's group was unable to coordinate its movements with Nishimura's group and arrived at Surigao Strait at the worst possible moment, in the middle of the encounter; after making a haphazard torpedo attack, Shima retreated.

Off Cape Engaño, 500 miles (800 km) north of Leyte Gulf, the Americans launched over 500 aircraft sorties at the Northern Force, followed by a surface group of cruisers and destroyers. All four Japanese carriers were sunk, but the Japanese had succeeded in drawing the American carriers away from Leyte Gulf. On 25 October the final major surface action fought between the Japanese and the American fleets occurred off Samar, when Kurita's Center Force fell upon a group of American escort carriers accompanied only by destroyers and destroyer escorts. Both sides were surprised, but the outcome looked certain, given the overwhelming advantage in firepower possessed by the Japanese. However, the Center Force conducted a largely indecisive gunnery duel before breaking off, managing only to sink two American destroyers, a destroyer escort, and one escort carrier.

Coincident to the battle, the recently constituted Japanese Special Attack Units launched their first successful preplanned and intentional suicide Kamikaze attacks. U.S. 7th Fleet's Task Unit 77.4.1, Call Sign "Taffy 1", was attacked at 0740 that morning with impacts and damage to two vessels. The Japanese fleet had withdrawn at 0920, but Taffy 3 was then attacked again, by Kamikaze aircraft, less than two hours later at 1050. A fifth ship from Taffy 3, the escort carrier USS St. Lo (CVE-63), was sunk when struck by a single A6M Zero carrying a 500 lb bomb.

Overall Japanese losses in the battle were extremely heavy, with four carriers, three battleships, six heavy cruisers, four light cruisers and eleven destroyers sunk. The Americans lost one light carrier, two escort carriers, two destroyers, and two destroyer escorts. The Battle of Leyte Gulf was the largest naval battle of World War II and arguably the largest naval battle in history. It was only the second time that an aircraft carrier was sunk by surface warships in the Second World War, when the Japanese Center Force sank the escort carrier Gambier Bay off Samar. The first such occurrence was the sinking of the fleet carrier HMS Glorious off Norway in 1940. For the Japanese, the defeat at Leyte Gulf was catastrophic—its navy's greatest ever loss of ships and men in combat. The inevitable liberation of the Philippines also meant that the Japanese Home Islands would be virtually cut off from the vital resources in Japan's occupied territories across Southeast Asia.

=== Philippines, 1944–1945 ===
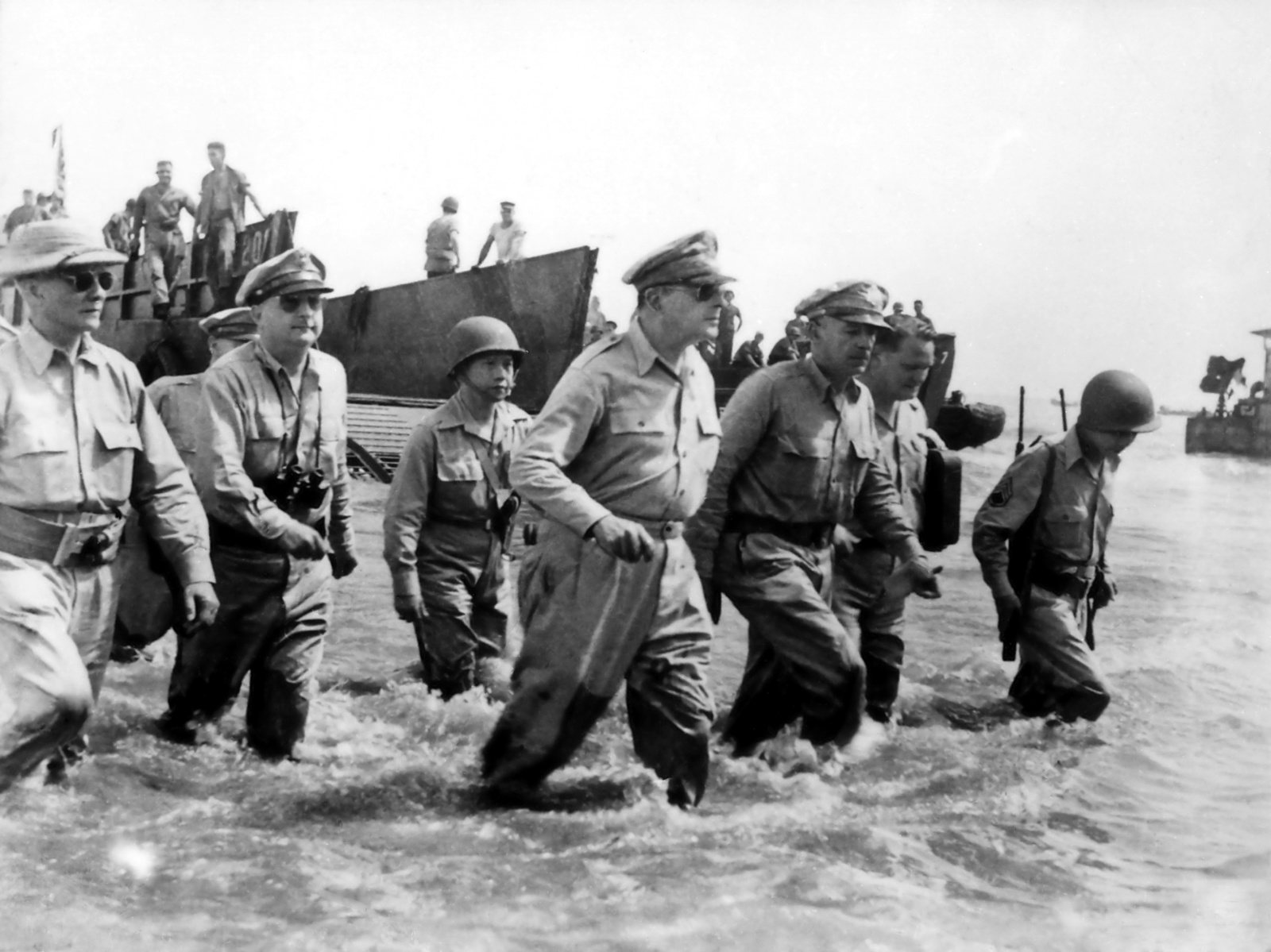
General Douglas MacArthur wading ashore at Leyte

On 20 October 1944 the US Sixth Army, supported by naval and air bombardment, landed on the favorable eastern shore of Leyte, north of Mindanao. The US Sixth Army continued its advance from the east, while the Japanese rushed reinforcements to the western side. The US reinforced the Sixth Army successfully, but the US Fifth Air Force devastated Japanese attempts to resupply IJA troops on the island. In torrential rains and over difficult terrain, the US advance continued across Leyte and the neighboring island of Samar to the north. On 7 December US Army units landed and, after a major land and air battle, cut off the Japanese ability to reinforce and supply Leyte. Although fierce fighting continued on Leyte for months, the US Army was in control.

On 15 December 1944, landings against minimal resistance took place on the southern beaches of the island of Mindoro, a key location in the planned Lingayen Gulf operations, in support of major landings scheduled on Luzon. On 9 January 1945, General Krueger's Sixth Army landed its first units on the western coast of Luzon. Almost 175,000 men followed within a few days. With heavy air support, Army units pushed inland, taking Clark Field, 40 miles (64 km) northwest of Manila, in the last week of January.

Two more major landings followed, one to cut off the Bataan Peninsula, and another, which included a parachute drop, south of Manila. Pincers closed in on the city, and on 3 February 1945, American forces pushed into Manila proper. The month-long battle for Manila resulted in over 100,000 civilian deaths and was the scene of the worst urban fighting by American forces in the Pacific theater. As the advance on Manila continued from the north and the south, the Bataan Peninsula was rapidly secured. On 16 February paratroopers and amphibious units assaulted the island fortress of Corregidor, and Japanese resistance ended there on 27 February.

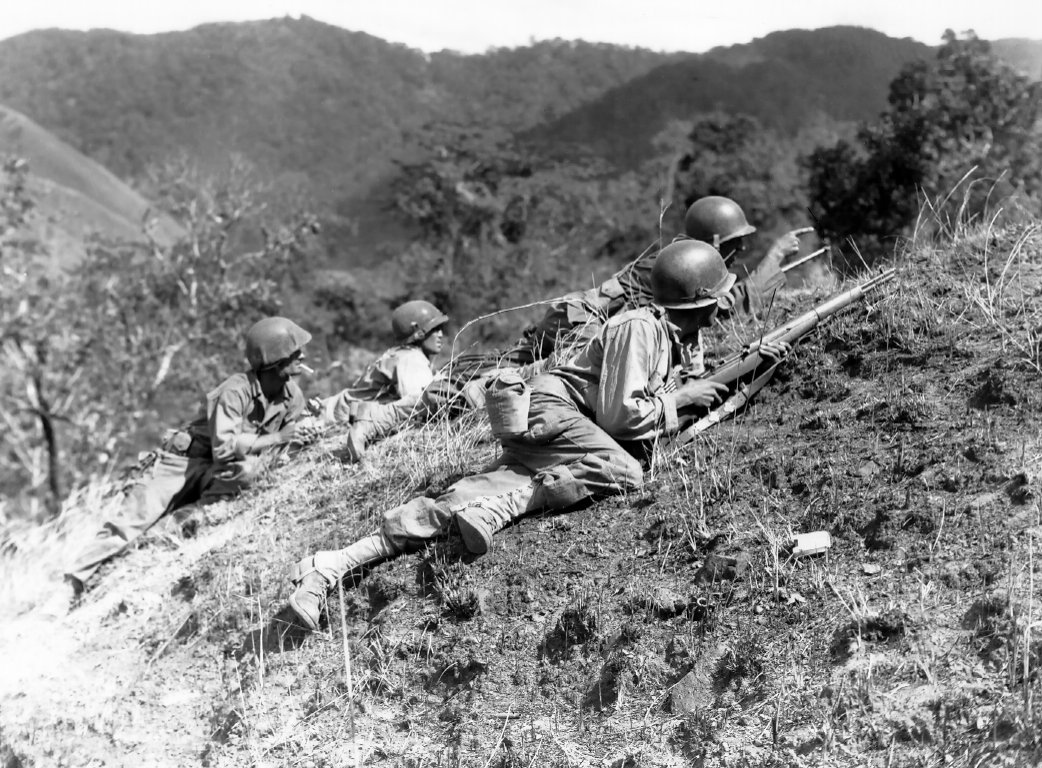
US troops approaching Japanese positions near Baguio, Luzon, 23 March 1945

In all, ten US divisions and five independent regiments fought on Luzon, making it the largest ground campaign of the Pacific War, involving more troops than the US had used in North Africa, Italy, or southern France. Forces included the Mexican Escuadrón 201 fighter-squadron as part of the Fuerza Aérea Expedicionaria Mexicana, with the squadron attached to the 58th Fighter Group of the United States Army Air Forces that flew tactical support missions. Of the 250,000 Japanese troops defending Luzon, 80 percent died. The last Japanese holdout in the Philippines, Hiroo Onoda, finally surrendered on 9 March 1974.

The Eighth Army invaded Palawan Island, between Borneo and Mindoro (the fifth-largest and westernmost Philippine island), on 28 February 1945, with landings at Puerto Princesa. The Japanese put up little direct defense of Palawan, but cleaning up pockets of Japanese resistance lasted until late April, as the Japanese used their common tactic of withdrawing into the mountain jungles, dispersed as small units. Throughout the Philippines, Filipino guerrillas aided US forces to dispatch the holdouts.

The US Eighth Army moved on to its first landing on Mindanao (17 April), the last of the major Philippine Islands to be taken. Then followed the invasion and occupation of Panay, Cebu, Negros and several islands in the Sulu Archipelago. These islands provided bases for the US Fifth and Thirteenth Air Forces to attack targets throughout the Philippines and the South China Sea.

== Final stages ==
=== Allied offensives in Burma, 1944–1945 ===
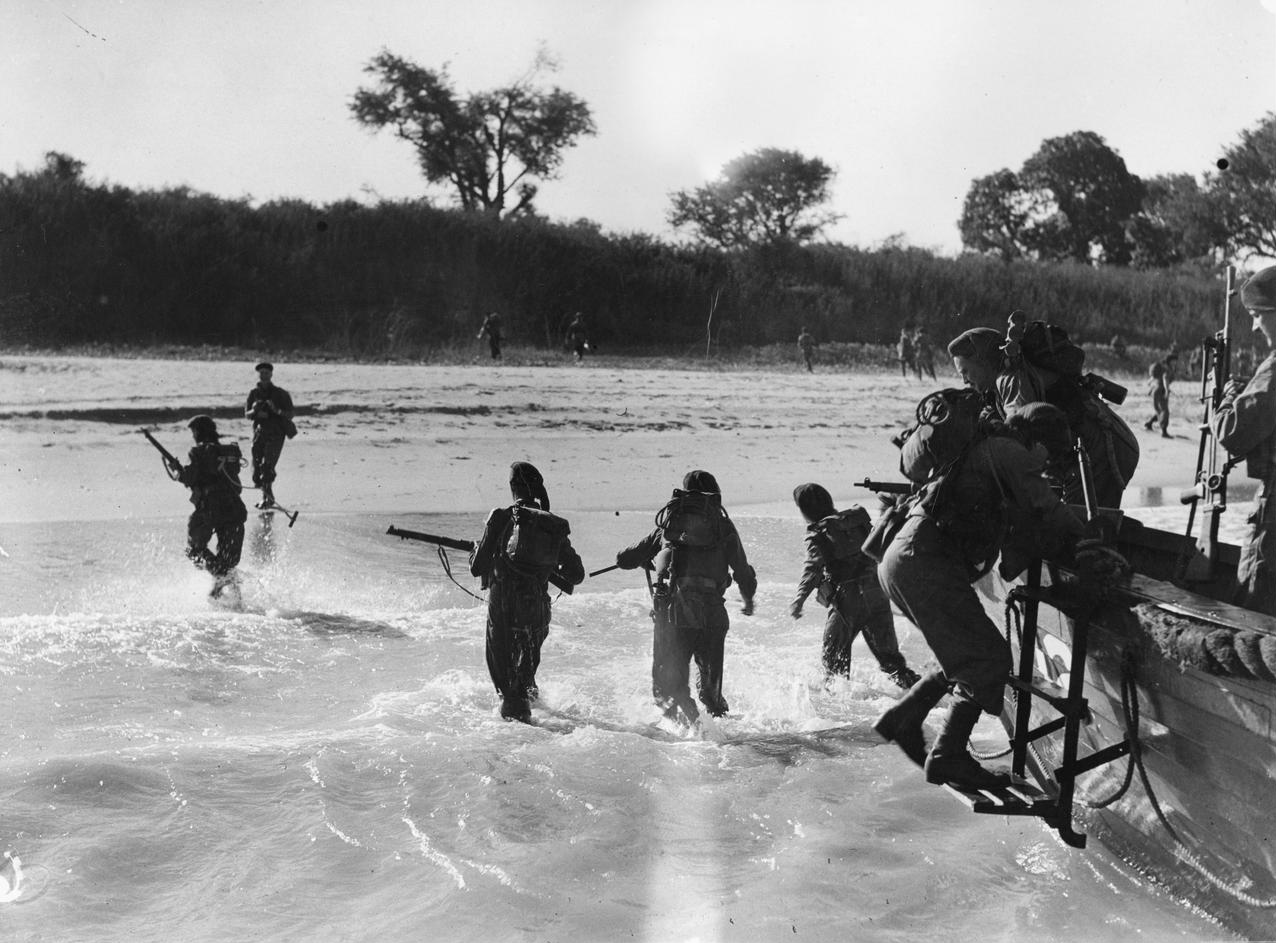
Royal Marines landing at Ramree

In late 1944 and early 1945, the Allied South East Asia Command launched offensives into Burma, intending to recover most of the country, including the capital of Rangoon, before the onset of the monsoon in May. The offensives were fought primarily by British Commonwealth, Chinese and American forces against Japan, assisted to some degree by Thailand, the Burma National Army and the Indian National Army. The Commonwealth land forces were drawn primarily from the United Kingdom, British India, and Africa.

The Indian XV Corps (including two West African divisions) advanced along the coast in Arakan Province, at last capturing Akyab Island. They landed troops behind the retreating Japanese, inflicting heavy casualties, and captured Ramree Island and Cheduba Island, establishing airfields used to support the offensive into Central Burma. The Chinese Expeditionary Force captured Mong-Yu and Lashio, while the Chinese and American Northern Combat Area Command resumed its advance in northern Burma. In late January 1945, these two forces linked up at Hsipaw. The Ledo Road was completed, linking India and China, but too late in the war to have any significant strategic effect on operations in China.

The Japanese Burma Area Army attempted to forestall the main Allied attack by withdrawing their troops behind the Irrawaddy River. Lieutenant General Heitarō Kimura, the new Japanese commander in Burma, hoped that the Allies' lines of communications would be overstretched trying to cross this obstacle. However, the advancing British Fourteenth Army switched its axis of advance to outflank the Japanese.

During February, the Fourteenth Army secured bridgeheads across the Irrawaddy. On 1 March, mechanized units of IV Corps captured the supply node of Meiktila, throwing the Japanese defenses into disarray. While the Japanese attempted to recapture Meiktila, XXXIII Corps captured Mandalay. The Japanese armies were heavily defeated, and with the capture of Mandalay, the Burmese population and the Burma National Army (which the Japanese had initially created) turned against the Japanese.

During April, Fourteenth Army advanced 300 miles (480 km) south towards Rangoon, but was delayed by Japanese rearguards 40 miles (64 km) to the north. Slim feared that the Japanese would defend Rangoon in house-to-house during the monsoon, which would commit his army to prolonged action with disastrously inadequate supplies, and in March he had asked that a plan to capture Rangoon by an amphibious force, Operation Dracula, which had been abandoned earlier, be reinstated. Dracula was launched on 1 May, only to find that the Japanese had already evacuated the city. The troops that occupied Rangoon linked up with Fourteenth Army five days later, securing the Allies' lines of communication.

Japanese forces that had been bypassed by the Allied advances attempted to break out across the Sittaung River during June and July to rejoin the Burma Area Army, which had regrouped in Tenasserim in southern Burma. They suffered 14,000 casualties, half of their strength. Overall, the Japanese lost some 150,000 men in Burma. Only 1,700 Japanese soldiers surrendered and were taken prisoner. The Allies were preparing to make amphibious landings in Malaya when word of the Japanese surrender arrived.

=== Iwo Jima ===
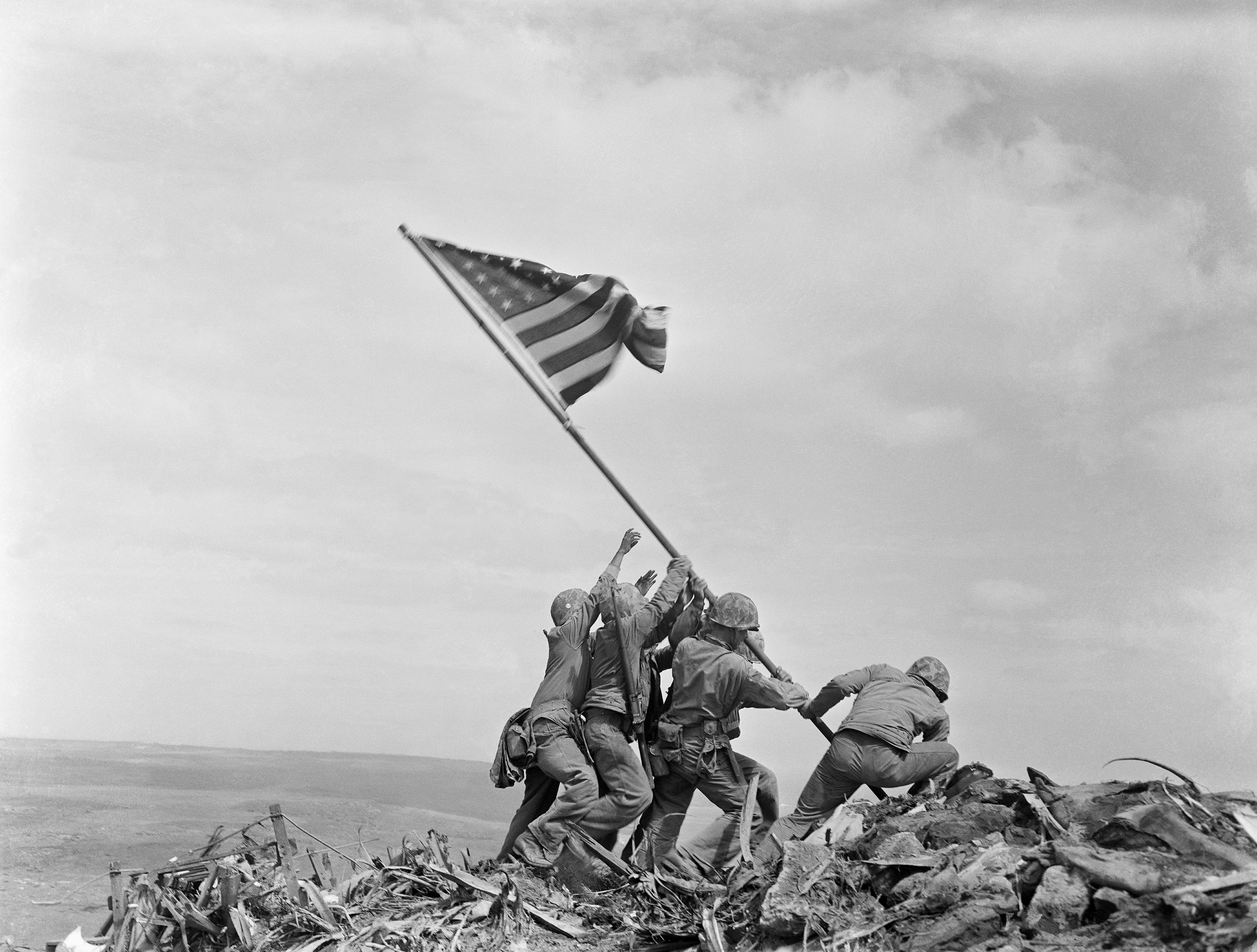
Raising the Flag on Iwo Jima, an iconic photograph taken by Joe Rosenthal on 23 February 1945, depicts six United States Marines raising a US flag atop Mount Suribachi.

Although the Marianas were secure and American bases firmly established, the long 1,200 miles (1,900 km) range from the Marianas meant that B-29 aircrews bombing Japan found themselves ditching at sea if severely damaged. To alleviate this issue, American strategists focused their attention on the small island of Iwo Jima, about halfway between the Marianas and Japan. American planners recognized the strategic importance of the island. It was used by the Japanese as an early-warning station against impending air raids on Japanese cities. Japanese aircraft based on Iwo Jima were able to attack the B-29s on their bombing missions, and even to attack installations in the Marianas themselves. The capture of Iwo Jima would provide emergency landing airfields for B-29s and a base for P-51 fighter escorts, as well as land-based air support to protect US naval fleets sailing close to the Japanese Home Islands. The Japanese had also come to realize the strategic value of Iwo Jima, and Lt. General Tadamichi Kuribayashi was assigned command of the island's garrison in May 1944. The Japanese began constructing elaborate defenses, making the best possible use of the island's natural caves and uneven, rocky terrain. The island was transformed into a massive network of bunkers, hidden guns, and underground passageways leading from one strongpoint to another. The Japanese also went to great lengths to construct large underground chambers, some as much as five stories deep, to serve as storage and hospital areas with thick walls and ceilings of reinforced concrete. A series of strongpoints covering the landing areas were also built, most covered with sand and carefully camouflaged. Well-hidden 120 mm and 6-inch guns were emplaced so that their fire could be directed to the beaches. Smaller-caliber artillery, antiaircraft guns, and mortars were also hidden and located where only a direct hit could destroy them. The Japanese were determined to make the Americans pay a high price for Iwo Jima, and were prepared to defend it to the death. Kuribayashi knew that he could not win the battle nonetheless hoped to inflict casualties so costly that it would slow the American advance on Japan, and perhaps give Japan bargaining power in negotiations to end the war. By February 1945, a total of 21,000 Japanese troops were deployed on Iwo Jima.

The American operation ("Operation Detachment") to capture the island involved three Marine divisions of the V Amphibious Corps, a total of 70,647 troops, under the command of Holland Smith. From mid-June 1944, Iwo Jima came under American air and naval bombardment, until the days leading up to the invasion.

An intense naval and air bombardment preceded the landing but did little except drive the Japanese defenders further underground and further mangle the island's barren volcanic terrain. Most Japanese fortifications survived the bombardment virtually unscathed. On the morning of 19 February 1945, 30,000 men under the command of Maj. General Harry Schmidt landed on the southeast coast near Mt. Suribachi, the dormant volcano around which most of the island's defenses were concentrated. As soon as the Marines pushed inland, they came under devastating machine gun and artillery fire. By the end of the day, the Marines reached the west coast, but their losses were severe: almost 2,000 men killed or wounded. On 23 February, the 28th Marine Regiment reached the summit of Mt. Suribachi, prompting the now famous Raising the Flag on Iwo Jima photograph, often cited as the most reproduced photograph in history and the archetypal representation of the Pacific War. For the rest of February, the Americans grinded north through a maze of Japanese defenses. By 1 March, they had taken two-thirds of the island. It was not until 26 March that the island was secured.

Iwo Jima was one of the bloodiest battles fought by the Americans during the Pacific War. American casualties were 6,821 killed and 19,207 wounded. The Japanese losses totaled well over 20,000 men killed, with only 1,083 prisoners taken. It was the only major island battle in the Pacific War where American casualties outnumbered Japanese losses. Historians continue to debate whether Iwo Jima was strategically worth the casualties sustained in capturing it.

=== Okinawa ===
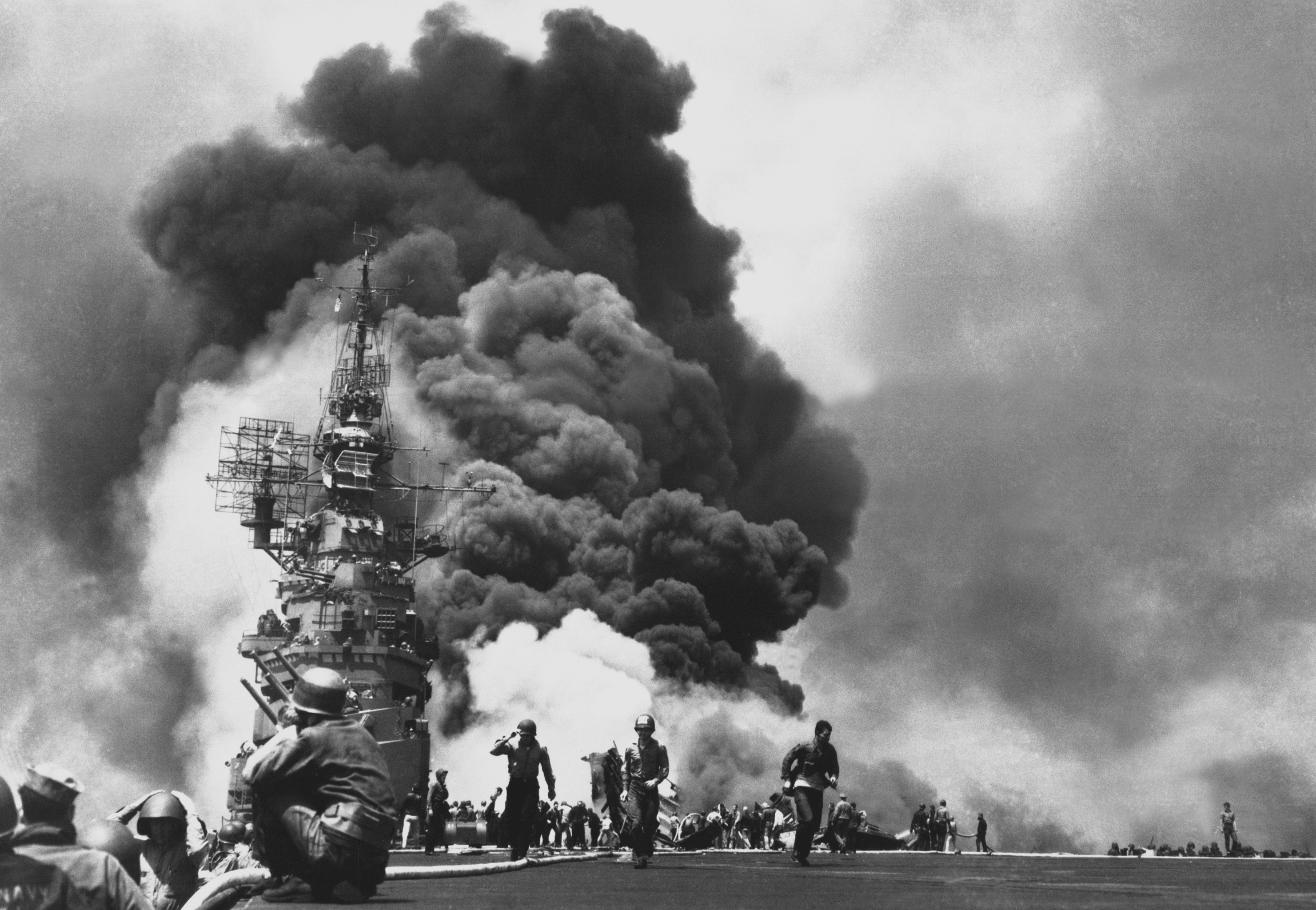
USS Bunker Hill burns after being hit by two kamikazes. At Okinawa, the kamikazes caused 4,900 American deaths.

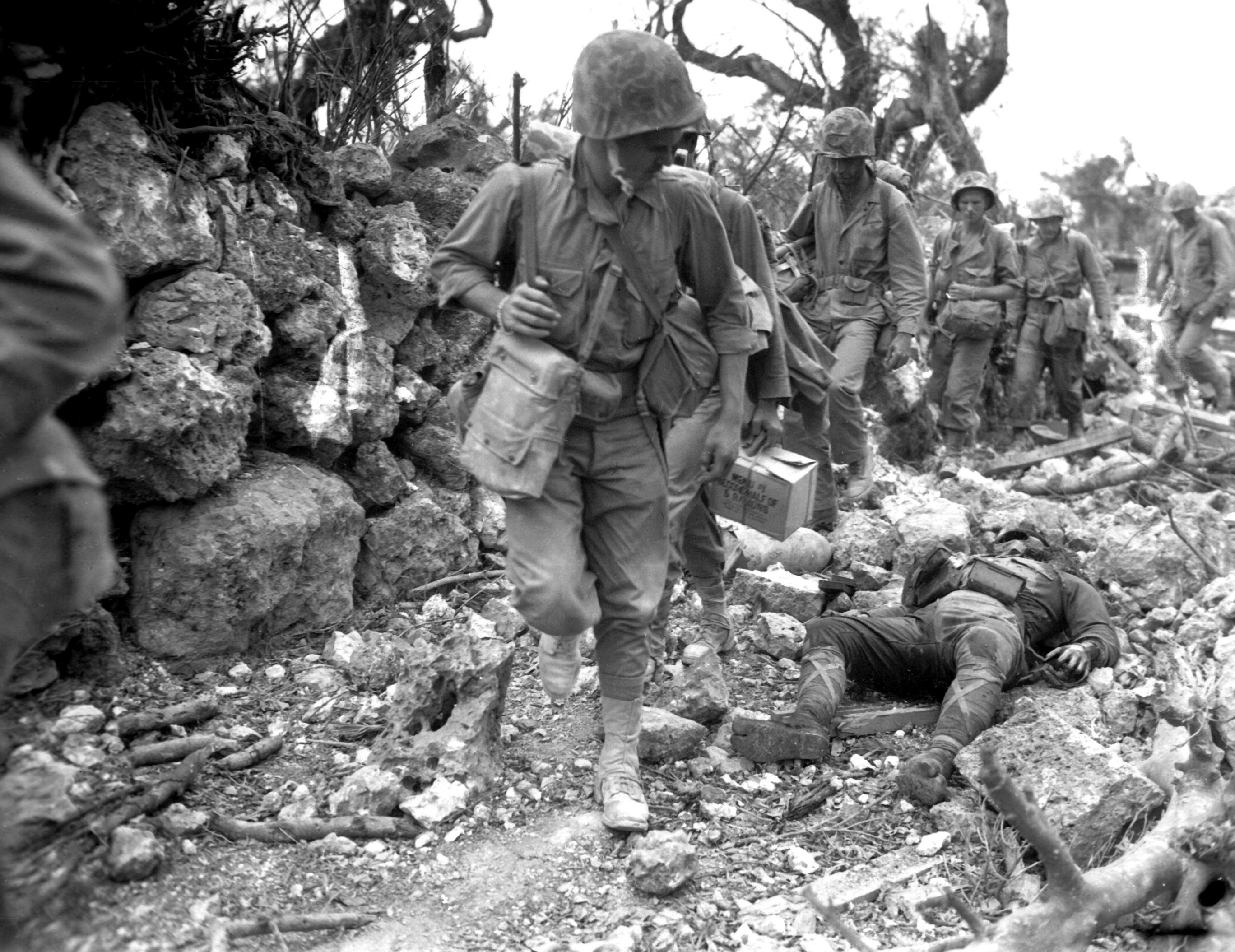
US Marines pass a dead Japanese soldier in a destroyed village on Okinawa, April 1945

The largest and bloodiest battle fought by the Americans against the Japanese took place on Okinawa. The seizure of islands in the Ryukyus was meant to be the last step before an invasion of Japan proper. Okinawa, the largest of the Ryukyu Islands, was located 340 miles (550 km) from Kyushu. The capture of Okinawa would provide airbases that could intensify aerial bombardment of Japan and offer direct land-based air support to an invasion of Kyushu. Seizing the islands would also allow the Americans to further tighten the blockade of Japan and be used as a staging area and supply base for any invasion of the Home Islands.

The Japanese troops defending Okinawa, under the command of Lieutenant General Mitsuru Ushijima, were a mixed force some 75,000–100,000 strong, augmented by thousands of conscripted civilians. American forces for the operation totaled 183,000 troops in seven divisions (four US Army and three Marine) under the Tenth Army. The British Pacific Fleet operated as a separate unit; its objective was to strike airfields on the chain of islands between Formosa and Okinawa, to prevent the Japanese from reinforcing Okinawa.

After an intense seven-day bombardment, the main landings on Okinawa took place on 1 April 1945, on the Hagushi beaches on the island's west coast. The Japanese did not contest the landings, and there was little opposition at the beaches, as the Japanese had decided to meet the Americans farther inland, out of range of naval gunfire. About 60,000 American troops landed on the first day, seizing two nearby airfields and pushing across the narrow width of the island.

The first major Japanese counterattack occurred on 6 and 7 April, in the form of attacks by kamikaze aircraft and a naval operation, called Ten-Go. Under the command of Admiral Seiichi Itō, the battleship Yamato, the light cruiser Yahagi and eight destroyers sortied from Kyushu as bait, meant to draw away as many American carrier aircraft as possible from Okinawa, in order to leave Allied naval forces vulnerable to large-scale kamikaze attacks. As a consequence of crippling Japanese shortages, the Yamato had only enough fuel to reach Okinawa. If she managed to reach the island,Yamato was ordered to beach herself and use her 18.1-inch (46 cm) guns to support Japanese forces with indirect fire. After being sighted by an American submarine and reconnaissance aircraft, the Yamato, Yahagi and four of the destroyers were sunk in a multi-hour blitz of aerial attacks by American carrier aircraft. Mass kamikaze attacks on American vessels near Okinawa intensified during the following three months, with 5,500 sorties being flown by the Japanese.

In the northern part of Okinawa, American troops only met light opposition, and the area was captured within about two weeks. However, the main Japanese defenses were in the south. There was bitter fighting against well-entrenched Japanese troops, but US forces slowly made progress. The seizure of Shuri castle on 29 May, the linchpin of Japanese resistance in the south, represented both a strategic and psychological blow to the remaining Japanese defenders. Organized resistance did not cease until 21 June; and many Japanese went into hiding. The campaign was not declared over until 2 July.

The battle for Okinawa proved costly and lasted much longer than the Americans had expected. The Japanese skillfully utilized terrain to inflict maximum casualties upon Allied ground forces. Total American casualties were 49,451, including 12,520 dead or missing and 36,631 wounded. Japanese casualties were approximately 110,000 killed and 7,400 taken prisoner. 94% of the Japanese soldiers died, along with many civilians. Kamikaze attacks sank 36 ships, damaged 368 more, and killed 4,900 US sailors, for the loss of 7,800 Japanese aircraft.

=== China, 1945 ===
Despite Japanese victories in Operation Ichi-Go, Japan was losing the battle in Burma and facing constant attacks from Chinese Nationalist forces and Communist guerrillas in the countryside. The IJA began preparations for the Battle of West Hunan in March 1945, mobilizing 80,000 men to seize Chinese airfields and secure railroads in West Hunan by early April. In response, the Chinese National Military Council dispatched the 4th Front Army and the 10th and 27th Army Groups with He Yingqin as commander-in-chief. At the same time, it airlifted the entire American-equipped Chinese New 6th Corps, along with veterans of the Burma Expeditionary Force, from Kunming to Zhijiang. Chinese forces totaled 110,000 men, supported by about 400 aircraft from Chinese and American air forces. Chinese forces decisively repulsed the Japanese advance, and subsequently launched a large counterattack. Concurrently, the Chinese repelled a Japanese offensive in Henan and Hubei. Afterward, Chinese forces retook Hunan and Hubei in South China. Chinese forces launched a counteroffensive to retake Guangxi, the last major Japanese stronghold in South China. In August 1945, Chinese forces retook Guangxi.

=== Borneo, 1945 ===
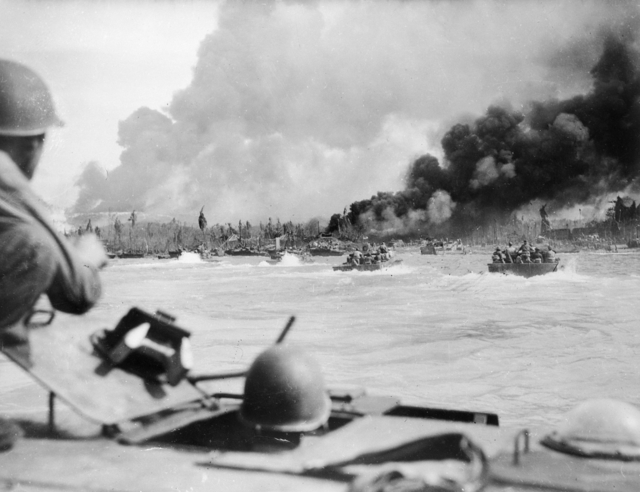
Australian soldiers landing at Balikpapan on 7 July 1945

The Borneo campaign of 1945 was the last major campaign in the South West Pacific Area. In a series of amphibious assaults between 1 May and 21 July, the Australian I Corps, under General Leslie Morshead, attacked Japanese forces occupying the island. Allied naval and air forces, centered on the US 7th Fleet under Admiral Thomas Kinkaid, the Australian First Tactical Air Force and the US Thirteenth Air Force, also played important roles in the campaign.

The campaign opened with a landing on the small island of Tarakan on 1 May. This was followed on 1 June by simultaneous assaults in the northwest, on the island of Labuan and the coast of Brunei. A week later the Australians attacked Japanese positions in North Borneo. The attention of the Allies then switched back to the central east coast, with the last major amphibious assault of World War II taking place at Balikpapan on 1 July.

Although the campaign was criticized in Australia as a "waste" of the lives of soldiers, it achieved a number of objectives, such as increasing the isolation of significant Japanese forces occupying the Dutch East Indies, capturing major oil supplies, and freeing Allied prisoners of war, who were being held in deteriorating conditions. At one of the very worst sites, around Sandakan in Borneo, only six of 2,500 British and Australian prisoners survived.

=== Landings in the Japanese home islands (1945) ===
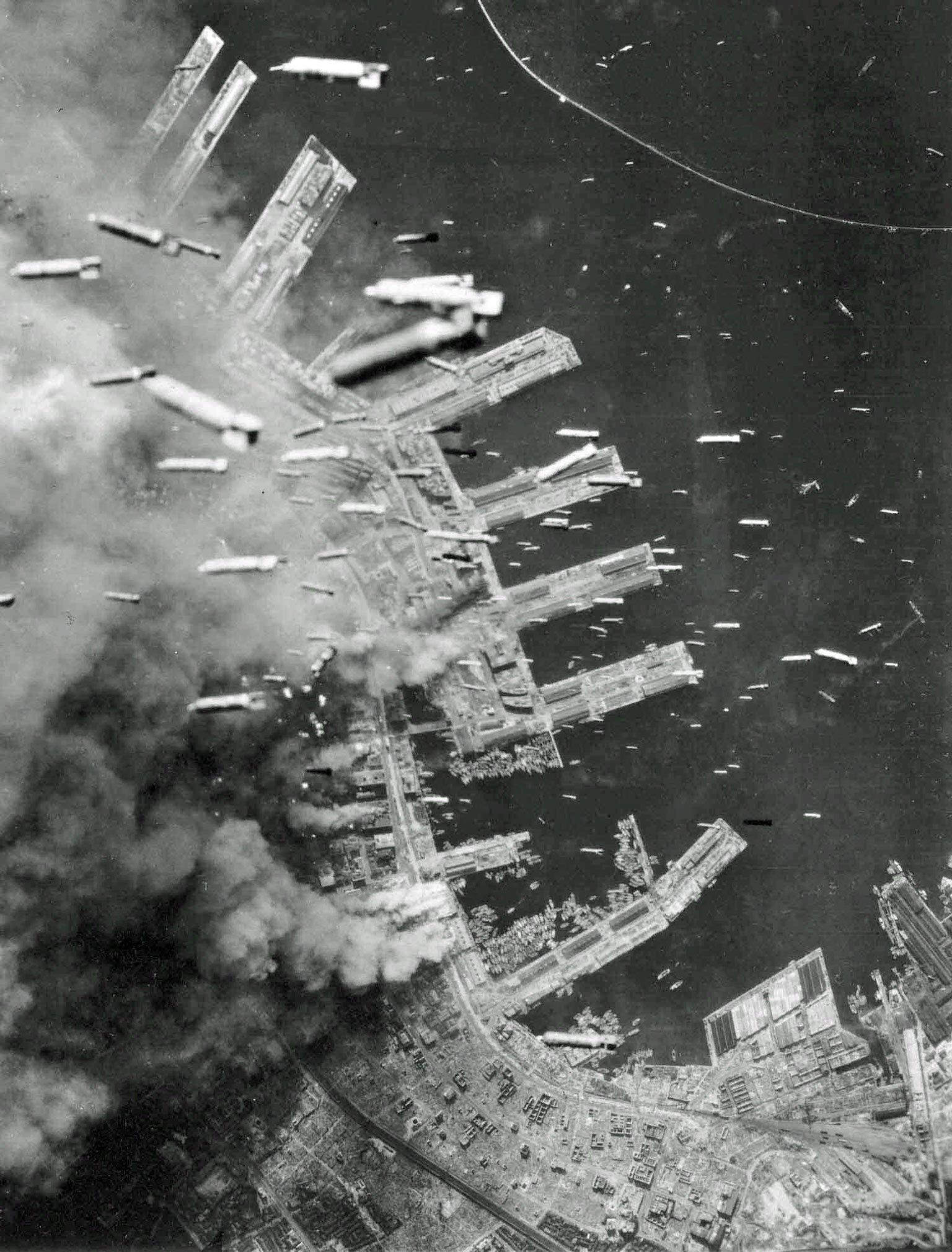
American B-29 Superfortresses drop incendiary bombs over the port city of Kobe, June 1945

Hard-fought battles on the Japanese islands of Iwo Jima, Okinawa, and others resulted in horrific casualties on both sides before finally producing a Japanese defeat. Of the 117,000 Okinawan and Japanese troops defending Okinawa, 94 percent died. Faced with the loss of most of their experienced pilots, the Japanese increased their use of kamikaze tactics in an attempt to create unacceptably high casualties for the Allies. The US Navy proposed to force a Japanese surrender through a total naval blockade and air raids. Many military historians believe that the Okinawa campaign led directly to the atomic bombings as a means of avoiding the ground invasion of Japan. This view is explained by Victor Davis Hanson: "because the Japanese on Okinawa... were so fierce in their defense (even when cut off, and without supplies), and because casualties were so appalling, many American strategists looked for an alternative means to subdue mainland Japan, other than a direct invasion. This means presented itself, with the advent of atomic bombs, which worked admirably in convincing the Japanese to sue for peace [unconditionally], without American casualties."

Towards the end of the war, as strategic bombing became more important, a new command for the United States Strategic Air Forces in the Pacific was created to oversee all US strategic bombing in the hemisphere, under General Curtis LeMay. Japanese industrial production plunged as nearly half of the built-up areas of 67 cities were destroyed by B-29 firebombing raids. On 9–10 March 1945 LeMay oversaw Operation Meetinghouse, in which 300 B-29s dropped 1,665 tons of bombs, mostly napalm-carrying M-69 incendiary bombs, on the Japanese capital. This attack is seen the most destructive bombing raid in history and killed between 80,000 and 100,000 people in a single night, destroying over 270,000 buildings and leaving over 1 million homeless. In the ten days that followed, almost 10,000 bombs were dropped, destroying 31% of Tokyo, Nagoya, Osaka and Kobe.

LeMay also oversaw Operation Starvation, in which the inland waterways of Japan were extensively mined by air, which disrupted the little remaining Japanese coastal sea traffic. On 26 July 1945, US President Harry S. Truman, Chiang, and Churchill issued the Potsdam Declaration, which outlined the terms of surrender for Japan that were agreed upon at the Potsdam Conference. This ultimatum stated that, if Japan did not surrender, it would face "prompt and utter destruction".

=== Atomic bombings of Hiroshima and Nagasaki ===
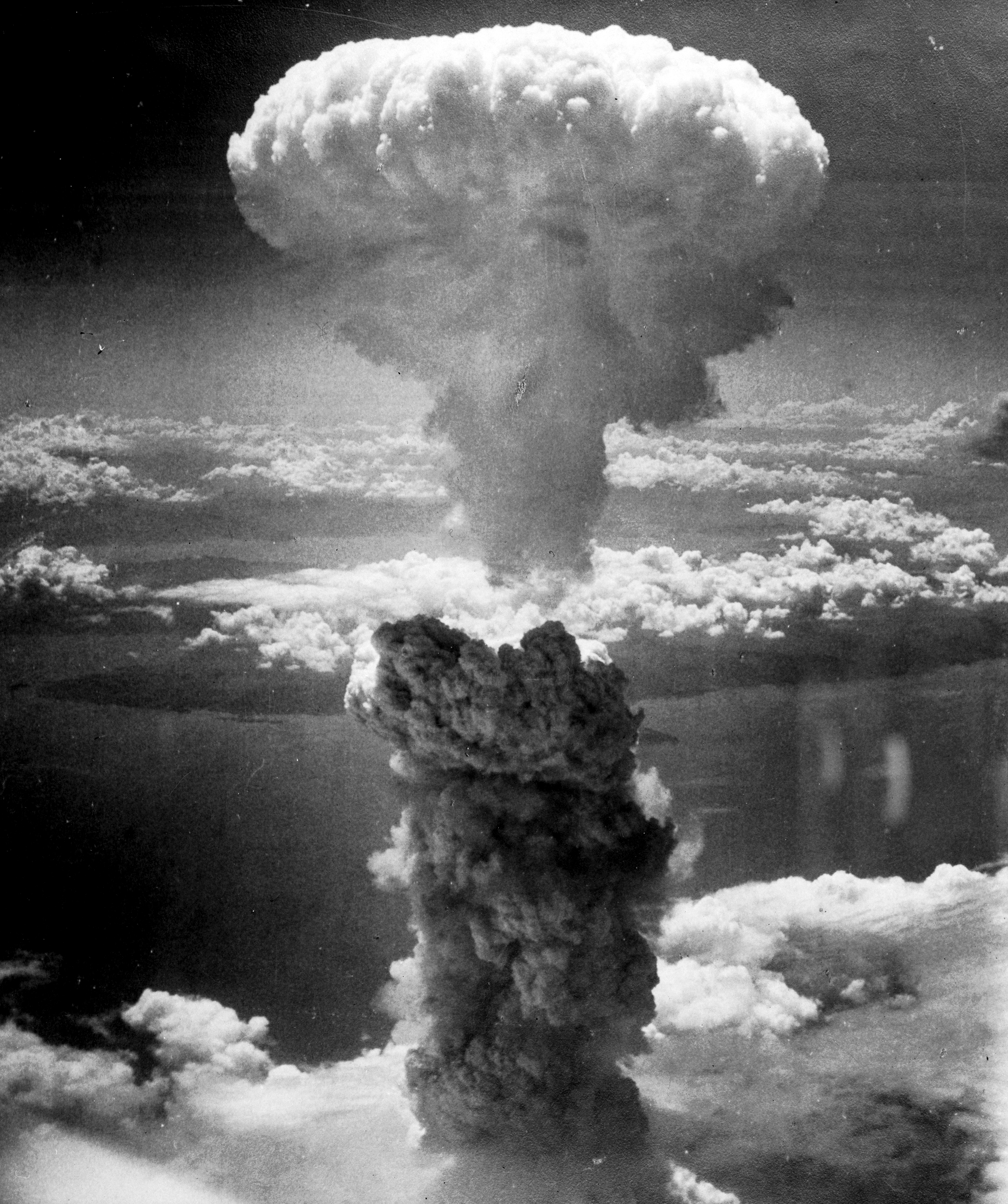
The mushroom cloud from the nuclear explosion over Nagasaki

On 6 August 1945, the U.S. dropped an atomic bomb on the Japanese city of Hiroshima in the first nuclear attack in history. In a press release issued after the bombing, Truman warned Japan to surrender or "expect a rain of ruin from the air, the like of which has never been seen on this Earth". On 9 August, the U.S. dropped another atomic bomb on Nagasaki.

More than 140,000–240,000 people died as a direct result of these two bombings. The necessity of the atomic bombings has long been debated, with detractors claiming that a naval blockade and incendiary bombing campaign had already made invasion, hence the atomic bomb, unnecessary. However, other scholars have argued that the atomic bombings shocked the Japanese government into surrender and helped avoid Operation Downfall, or a prolonged blockade and conventional bombing campaign, any of which would have exacted much higher casualties among Japanese civilians. Historian Richard B. Frank wrote that a Soviet invasion of Japan was never likely because they had insufficient naval capability.

=== Soviet entry ===
Red Army soldiers on the march in Manchuria, August 1945

In February 1945 during the Yalta Conference the Soviet Union had agreed to enter the war against Japan 90 days after the surrender of Germany. At the time, Soviet participation was seen as crucial in order to tie down the large number of Japanese forces in Manchuria and Korea, keeping them from being transferred to the Home Islands to defend against an invasion.

On 9 August, exactly on schedule, the Soviet Union entered the war by invading Manchuria. A battle-hardened, one million-strong Soviet force, transferred from Europe, attacked Japanese forces of the Kantōgun (Kwantung Army) across most of the Manchurian frontier.

The Manchurian strategic offensive operation began on 9 August 1945, with the Soviet invasion of the Japanese puppet state of Manchukuo. This was the last campaign of the Second World War, and the largest of the 1945 Soviet–Japanese War, which resumed hostilities between the USSR and Japan after almost six years of peace. Soviet forces conquered Manchukuo, Mengjiang (Inner Mongolia) and northern Korea. The USSR's entry into the war was a significant factor in the Japanese decision to surrender, as it became apparent to the government in Tokyo that the Soviets were no longer willing to act as an intermediary for a negotiated settlement on terms favorable to Japan.

In late 1945, the Soviets launched a series of successful invasions of northern Japanese territories, in preparation for the possible invasion of Hokkaido:

- Invasion of South Sakhalin (11–25 August)
  - Maoka Landing (19–22 August)
- Invasion of the Kuril Islands (18 August to 1 September)
  - Battle of Shumshu (18–23 August)

=== Surrender ===
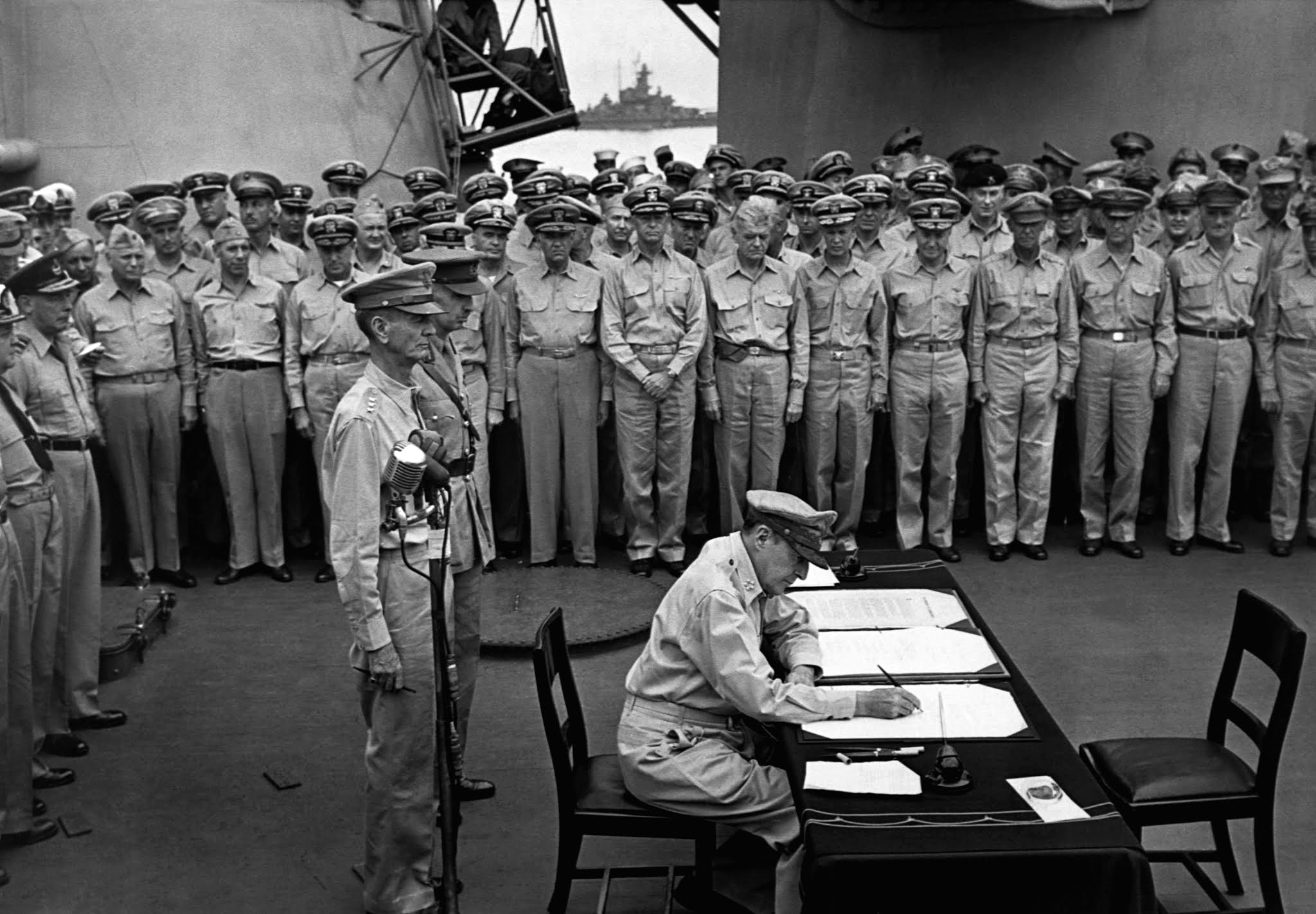
Douglas MacArthur signs the formal Japanese Instrument of Surrender on USS Missouri, 2 September 1945.

Months of American air and naval attacks, two atomic bombings, and the Soviet invasion of Manchuria had a profound impact on Japanese decision-making. On 10 August 1945, Japanese Prime Minister Kantarō Suzuki and his cabinet decided to accept the Potsdam terms on one condition: the "prerogative of His Majesty as a Sovereign Ruler". At noon on 15 August, after the American government's intentionally ambiguous reply, stating that the "authority" of the Emperor "shall be subject to the Supreme Commander of the Allied Powers", the Emperor Hirohito broadcast the rescript of surrender.

Should we continue to fight, it would not only result in an ultimate collapse and obliteration of the Japanese nation, but also it would lead to the total extinction of human civilization.

— Emperor Hirohito, The Voice of the Crane: The Imperial Rescript of 15 August 1945

In Japan, 14 August is considered the end of the Pacific War. However, as Imperial Japan actually surrendered on 15 August, this day became known in the English-speaking countries as V-J Day (Victory in Japan). The formal Japanese Instrument of Surrender was signed on 2 September 1945. The surrender was accepted by MacArthur as Supreme Commander of the Allied Powers. MacArthur then went to Tokyo to oversee the occupation of Japan (from 28 August 1945 to 28 April 1952, when the Treaty of San Francisco came into force).

== Casualties ==
=== Allied ===
==== United States ====
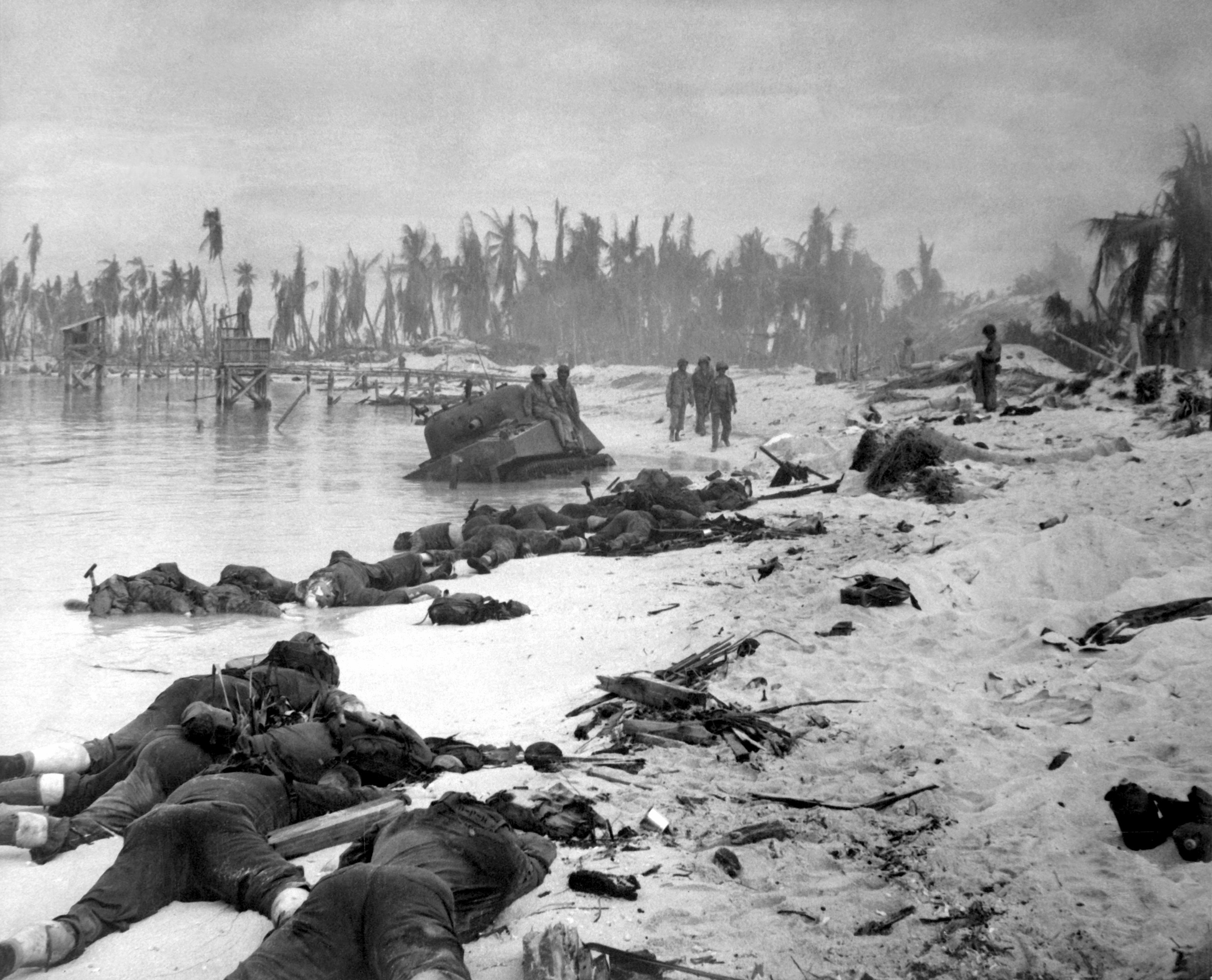
American corpses sprawled on the beach of Tarawa, November 1943

Total American losses are 161,000 killed and 248,000 wounded. Combat losses amount to 107,903 killed in action and 208,333 wounded. The figure for battle deaths include Army prisoners who died in Japanese captivity; this is the standard itemization of for US deaths in the Pacific War. However, historian John W. Dower notes that there are inconsistencies within the official US statistics themselves. Over half of all American losses suffered in the Pacific occurred between July 1944 and July 1945. Combined, the US and allied navies lost nearly 200 warships, including 4 battleships, 12 aircraft carriers, 25 cruisers, 84 destroyers and destroyer escorts, 63 submarines, and nearly 30,000 aircraft. This gave the Allies a 2–1 exchange ratio with the Japanese in terms of ships and aircraft.

The US protectorate in the Philippines suffered considerable losses. Military losses were 27,000 dead (including POWs), 75,000 living POWs, and an unknown number wounded, not counting irregulars that fought in the insurgency. Between 500,000 and 1,000,000 Filipino civilians died due to war-related shortages, massacres, shelling, and bombing.

==== China ====
Modern Western figures estimate the Chinese death toll at around 14,000,000 to 15,000,000 dead. Rana Mitter cites Odd Arne Westad's scholarship to posit some 2,000,000 military dead and 12,000,000 civilian dead. Diana Lary notes that the official postwar figures for China's population showed a drop of around 18,000,000 people from 1937 to 1945. Chinese state media outlet China Daily lists the total number of military and non-military casualties, both dead and wounded, at 35 million. Duncan Anderson, Head of the Department of War Studies at the Royal Military Academy, states that the total number of casualties was around 20 million. Rudolph Rummel gave a figure of 3,949,000 people in China murdered directly by the Japanese army while giving a figure of 10,216,000 total dead in the war with the additional millions of deaths due to indirect causes like starvation or disease.

The official account of the war published in Taiwan reported that the Nationalist Chinese Army lost 3,238,000 men (1,797,000 wounded, 1,320,000 killed, and 120,000 missing) and 5,787,352 civilians casualties putting the total number of casualties at 9,025,352. The soldiers of the Chinese Communist Party suffered 584,267 casualties, of which 160,603 were killed, 133,197 missing, and 290,467 wounded. This would equate to a total of 3.82 million combined NRA/CCP casualties, of which 1.74 million were killed or missing. An academic study published in the United States estimates Chinese military casualties as 1.5 million killed in battle, 750,000 missing in action, 1.5 million deaths due to disease and 3 million wounded; civilian casualties: due to military activity, 1,073,496 killed and 237,319 wounded; 335,934 killed and 426,249 wounded in Japanese air attacks. According to updated official data from the State Council of the PRC, based on archival research, total combat casualties among Chinese military personnel (including Kuomintang forces, Communist units, and guerrilla formations) amounted to 3.8 million killed or dead from wounds.

Famines during the war caused by drought affected both China and India: the Chinese famine of 1942–1943 in Henan led to starvation deaths of 2 to 3 million people, Guangdong famine caused more than 3 million people to flee or die, and the 1943–1945 Indian famine in Bengal killed about 7 million Indian civilians in Bihar and Bengal. According to historian Mitsuyoshi Himeta, at least 2.47 million civilians died during the "kill all, loot all, burn all" operation (Three Alls Policy) implemented in May 1942 in north China by general Yasuji Okamura.

The property loss suffered by the Chinese was valued at 383 billion US dollars according to the currency exchange rate in July 1937, roughly 50 times the gross domestic product of Japan at that time. The war created 95 million refugees.

==== Commonwealth ====
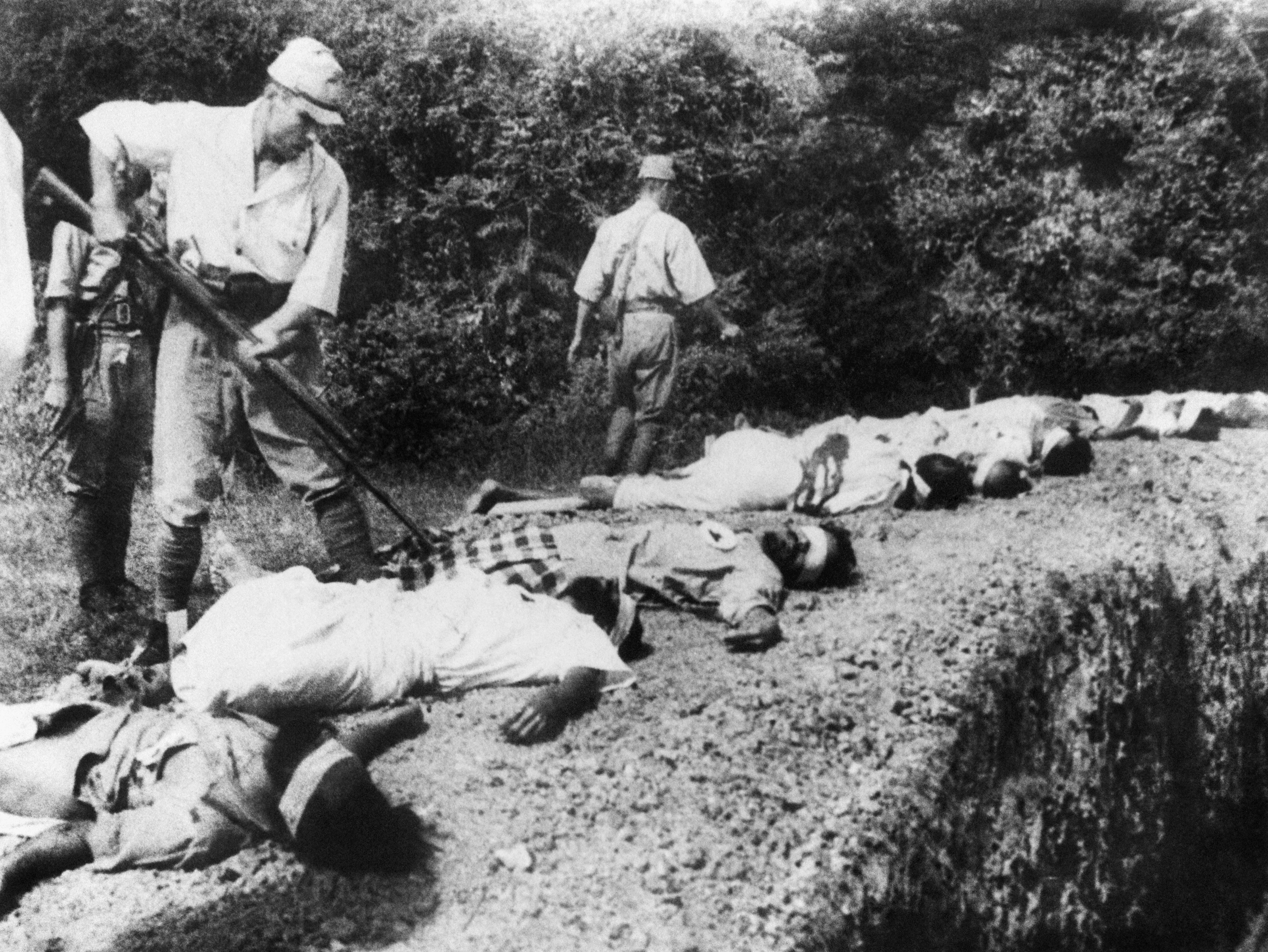
Indian prisoners of war shot and bayoneted by Japanese soldiers

Between the Malayan Campaign (130,000 discounting some 20,000 Australians), Burma Campaign (86,600), Battle of Hong Kong (15,000), and various naval encounters, British, Dominion and Empire forces incurred some 235,000 casualties in the Pacific Theater, including roughly 82,000 killed (50,000 in combat and 32,000 as POWs).

Britain incurred 90,332 casualties, of whom 29,968 were killed, 12,433 as prisoners of war. The Japanese captured a total of 50,016 POWs from Britain.

The Royal Navy lost 23 warships in the Pacific and Indian oceans: 1 battleship, 1 battlecruiser, 1 aircraft carrier, 3 cruisers, 8 destroyers, 5 submarines, and 4 escorts. There were significant indirect losses to the British Empire territories of India and Burma, including 3 million deaths in the Bengal famine and 0.25 to 1 million deaths in British Burma.

Australia incurred casualties of 45,841 not including natural deaths: 17,501 killed (including POW deaths in captivity), 13,997 wounded, and 14,345 living POWs. New Zealand lost 578 killed, with an unknown number wounded or captured. 294 Canadians were killed in Hong Kong and the Aleutians, and a further 1,691 were captured, of whom 273 died as POWs, for a total of 567 dead. Eight Royal Australian Navy warships were sunk: 3 cruisers (Canberra, Perth, and Sydney), 2 destroyers, and 3 corvettes.

==== Others ====
Between Lake Khasan, Khalkin Gol, advisors deployed to China, and the 1945 operations in Manchuria and the Kuriles, Soviet casualties against Japan totaled 68,612: 22,731 killed/missing and 45,908 wounded. Material losses included some 1,000 tanks and AFVs, 5 landing ships, and 300 aircraft. Mongolian casualties were 753.

The entire 140,000-strong Royal Dutch East Indies Army was killed, captured, or missing by the conclusion of the East Indies Campaign. 1,500 colonial and 900 Dutch soldiers were killed in action. Most of the colonial soldiers were freed on the spot or deserted. Of the ethnic Dutch troops, 900 were killed in action and 37,000 became prisoners. 8,500 of these POWs would die in Japanese captivity. Dutch naval losses in the Pacific numbered 2 cruisers, 7 destroyers, 5 submarines, 7 minelayers, and 7 minesweepers. About 30,000 Dutch and 300,000 Indonesian forced laborers died during the Japanese occupation of the East Indies, while 3 million Indonesian civilians perished in famines.

Similar to the Dutch, the 65,000-strong French colonial army in French Indochina (16,500 European French and 48,500 colonial) disintegrated at the end of the Japanese invasion. 2,129 European French and 2,100 Indochinese colonial troops were killed, while 12,000 French and 3,000 colonial troops were kept as prisoners. 1–2 million deaths occurred in French Indochina during the Japanese occupation, mostly due to the Vietnamese famine of 1944–1945.

=== Axis ===
IJA soldiers after a suicide charge on US Marine positions in Guadalcanal

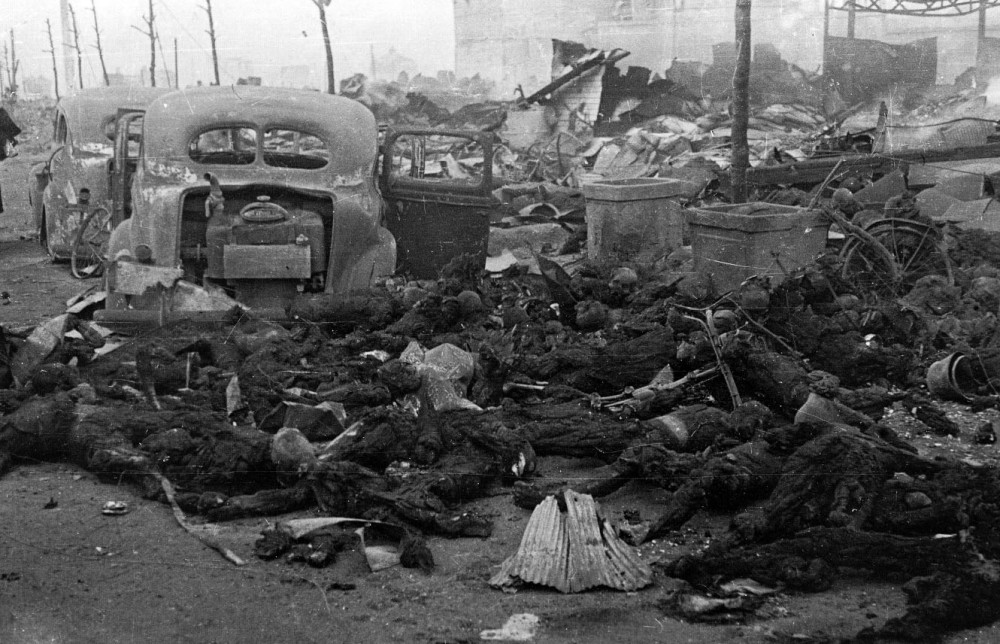
Charred remains of civilians killed in the 10 March firebombing of Tokyo, codenamed Operation Meetinghouse, which killed an estimated 100,000 people, March 1945

Eight hundred thousand Japanese civilians and over 2 million Japanese soldiers died during the war. According to a report by the Relief Bureau of the Japanese Ministry of Health and Welfare in 1964, the combined number of Japanese Army and Navy personnel who died during the war (1937–1945) was approximately 2,121,000, most of whom died fighting either against the United States (an estimated 1.1–1.3 million) or against various Chinese factions in Manchuria, Burma, and mainland China (500,000–700,000). A significant number of Japanese soldiers also died in the war against the British Commonwealth (about 200,000), and against the USSR (about 140,000, if you take into account the 60,000 who died in Soviet captivity after the war). The losses were broken down as follows:

Losses
Location	Army dead	Navy dead	Total
Japan	58,100	45,800	103,900
Bonin Islands	2,700	12,500	15,200
Okinawa	67,900	21,500	89,400
Formosa (Taiwan)	28,500	10,600	39,100
Korea	19,600	6,900	26,500
Sakhalin, the Aleutian, & Kuril Islands	8,200	3,200	11,400
Manchuria	45,900	800	46,700
China (incl. Hong Kong)	435,600	20,100	455,700
Siberia	52,300	400	52,700
Central Pacific	95,800	151,400	247,200
Philippines	377,500	121,100	498,600
French Indochina	7,900	4,500	12,400
Thailand	6,900	100	7,000
Burma (incl. India)	163,000	1,500	164,500
Malaya & Singapore	8,500	2,900	11,400
Andaman & Nicobar Islands	900	1,500	2,400
Sumatra	2,700	500	3,200
Java	2,700	3,800	6,500
Lesser Sundas	51,800	1,200	53,000
Borneo	11,300	6,700	18,000
Celebes	1,500	4,000	5,500
Moluccas	2,600	1,800	4,400
New Guinea	112,400	15,200	127,600
Bismarck Archipelago	19,700	10,800	30,500
Solomon Islands	63,200	25,000	88,200
Totals	1,647,200	473,800	2,121,000

General George C. Marshall put Japanese "battle dead" against the Americans at 965,000 (South Pacific: 684,000, Central Pacific: 273,000, Aleutians: 8,000), with 37,308 captured, from 7 December 1941 to 30 June 1945 (the war had yet to conclude). These are juxtaposed with the losses in the theater of the US Army alone, suggesting Japanese naval casualties were not included. His figure for Japanese "battle dead" in China was 126,000 in the same period.

The IJN lost over 341 warships, including 11 battleships, 25 aircraft carriers, 39 cruisers, 135 destroyers, and 131 submarines, almost entirely in action against the US Navy. The IJN and IJA together lost 45,125 aircraft.

Germany lost ten submarines and four auxiliary cruisers (Thor, Michel, Pinguin, and Kormoran) in the Indian and Pacific oceans.

=== War crimes ===
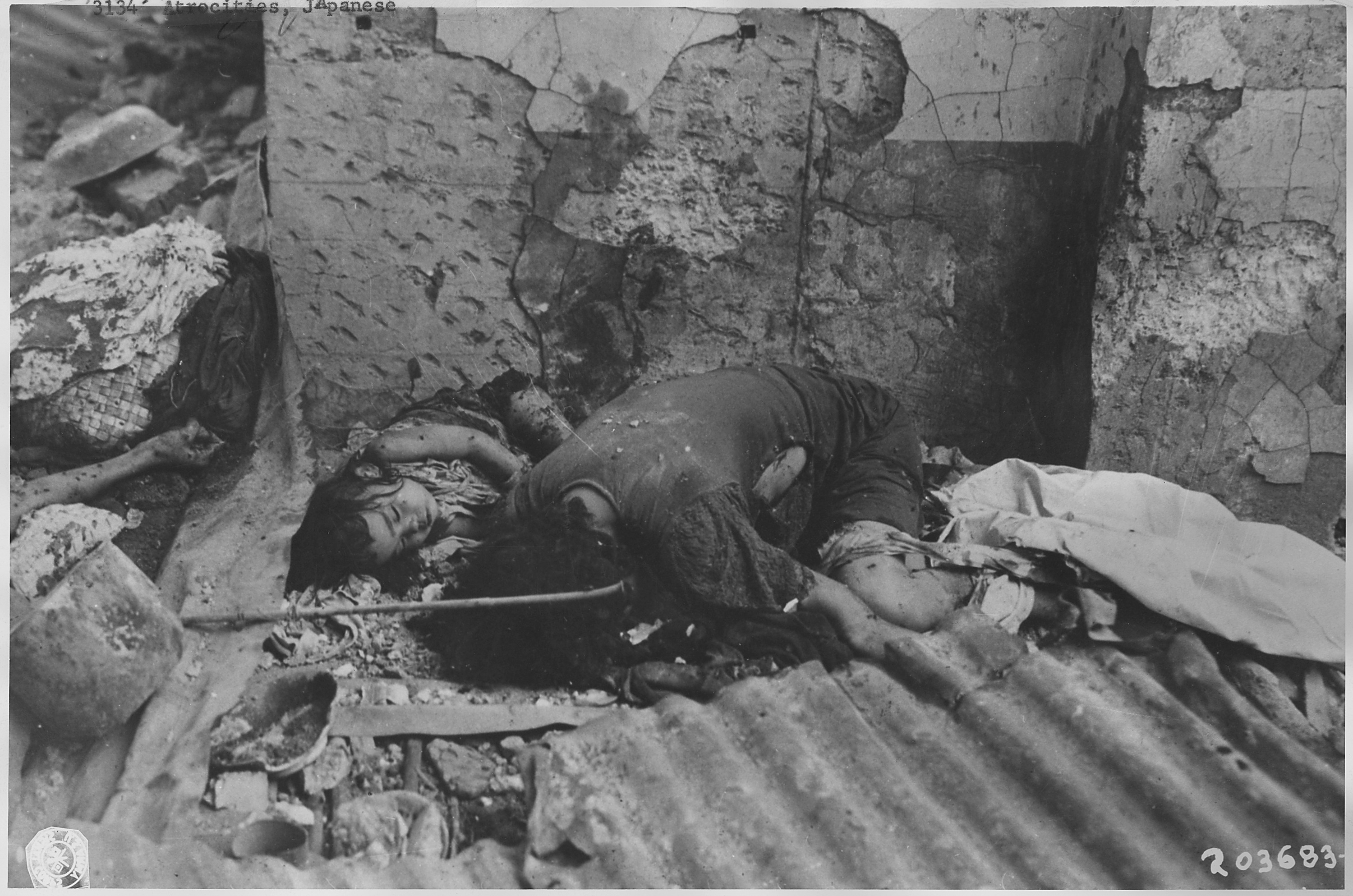
A Filipino woman and child killed by Japanese forces in the Manila massacre

==== By Japan ====
During the Pacific War, Japanese soldiers killed millions of non-combatants, including prisoners of war, from surrounding nations. At least 20 million Chinese died during the Second Sino-Japanese War. The Three Alls Policy was responsible for the deaths of more than 2.7 million Chinese civilians.

The Nanjing Massacre is the most infamous example of Japanese atrocities against civilians during the war. According to the International Military Tribunal for the Far East, more than 200,000 Chinese civilians were killed, while the Nanjing War Crimes Tribunal concluded that over 300,000 died. The Manila massacre killed over 100,000 Filipino civilians. Japan also deployed biological weapons.

According to the findings of the Tokyo Tribunal, the death rate of Western prisoners was 27%, seven times that of Western POWs under the Germans and Italians. Some of the more notorious instances of abuse of prisoners were the Bataan Death March and forced labor in the construction of the Burma–Thailand "Death Railway". Around 1,536 US civilians died in Japanese internment camps, compared to 883 in German internment camps.

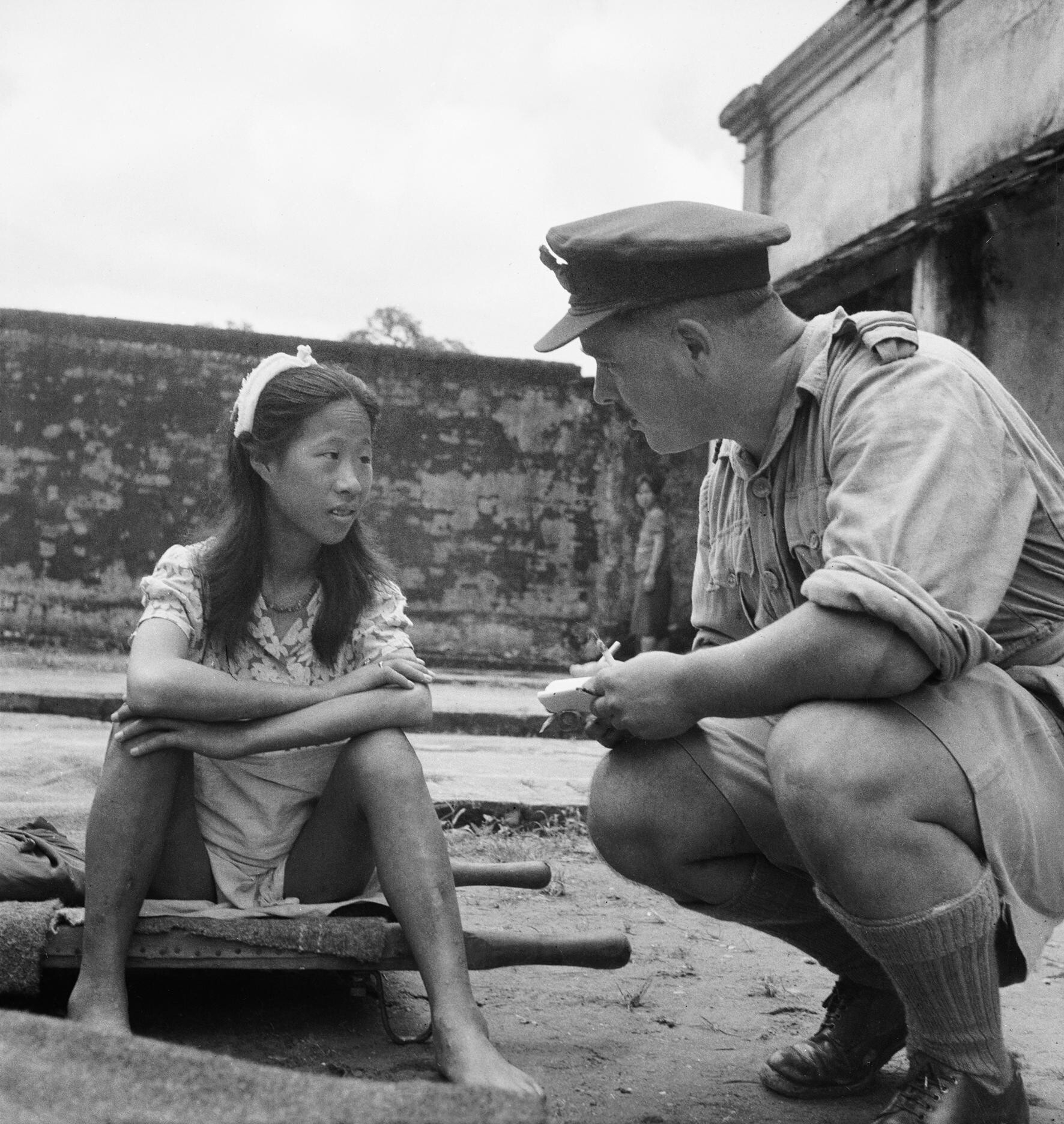
A young Chinese girl from a Japanese 'comfort battalion' being interviewed by a British officer. Rangoon, Burma, 1945

A widely publicized example of institutionalized sexual slavery are comfort women—200,000 women and girls, mostly from Korea and China, who were forced to serve in Japanese military camps.

==== By the Allies ====
The firebombing of Tokyo has been described by writer Jonathan Rauch as a war crime. A United States Strategic Bombing Survey estimated that 84% of the attacked area was residential, mostly inhabited by women, children and the elderly; the over 100,000 victims constitute the deadliest aerial bombing raid in history.

American soldiers commonly collected the body parts of dead Japanese soldiers as trophies. American soldiers are alleged to have committed rapes during the Battle of Okinawa.

==== Tribunals ====
The International Military Tribunal for the Far East in Ichigaya from 29 April 1946 to 12 November 1948 tried those accused of the most serious war crimes. Military tribunals were also held throughout Asia and the Pacific.

== See also ==
- Dissent in the Armed Forces of the Empire of Japan
- European theatre of World War II
- Mediterranean and Middle East theatre of World War II
- Pacific Theater aircraft carrier operations during World War II
- Hull note – US ultimatum to Japan leading into WWII
- Japanese-American service in World War II
- Japanese in the Chinese resistance to the Empire of Japan
- List of Pacific War campaigns
- Nanshin-ron – Empire of Japan political doctrine
- Yasukuni Shrine
- Wallis and Futuna in World War II
- War Plan Orange
