= Operation Character =

Part of Burma Campaign during World War 2

- Part of the Burma campaign of World War II
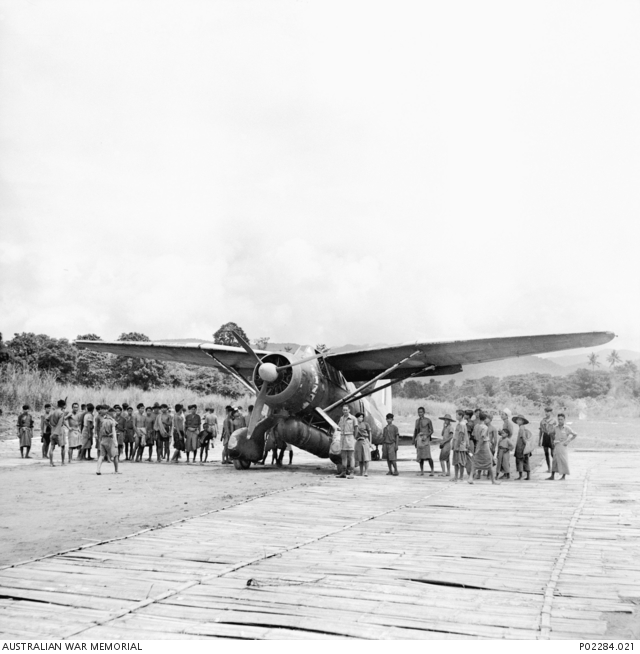
- A Westland Lysander IIIA of No. 357 Squadron RAF rests on a makeshift landing strip at a remote Karen hill village in July 1945 during Operation Character
Date	28 March – 13 September 1945
Location	Karen Hills, Burma
Result	British victory

Belligerents
(British Empire) United Kingdom; (Myanmar) Burma	(Empire of Japan) Japan

Commanders and leaders
Colin Mackenzie; Edgar Peacock	Heitarō Kimura (surrendered); Masaki Honda (surrendered)

Strength
Force 136; Karen Guerrillas (12,000)	Burma Area Army (remnants) 50,000

Casualties and losses
Total: 200	Total: 12,000

Operation Character was a Special Operations Executive (SOE) and Jedburgh operation that took place in the Burma campaign between February and September 1945 during World War II. 110 British, Indian, Gurkha and Canadian personnel of Force 136, three-man Jedburgh Teams and over a hundred men of various Burmese ethnicities, mobilized 12,000 Karen people into four regional groups to fight against the Japanese in the Karen Hills. The presuppose was to support General Bill Slim's XIV Army which was striking for Rangoon during the reconquest of Burma from the Japanese in early 1945.

Following the defeat of the Japanese at Meiktila and Mandalay in March, the Karen irregulars harried the 50,000 Japanese attempting to withdraw through the hills. SOE also directed air strikes and provided close reconnaissance of targets for the RAF. Ambushes were made against Japanese forces in the hills attempting to reinforce the front facing XIV Army. Following the capture of Rangoon, XIV Army suspended further operations, and so Japanese pressure was made against the Character teams. This however made little impression and instead the Japanese attempted to break out to the Pegu Yomas in late July but suffered heavy casualties from Karen guerrillas and SOE. Despite the war ending in August 1945, Character was still an active operation - the Japanese cut off and without communications held out until September until their surrender.

The operation as a whole proved highly effective, Character had inflicted significant casualties on Japanese forces, ably assisted XIV Army and demonstrated the success of combining SOE and local forces. It was the most successful SOE operation of the war.

== Background ==
In Burma, the Karens were the largest of the minority communities. Many live in the Irrawaddy delta, but the majority of the Karenni live in the mountainous and heavily forested tract along the border with Siam.

Following the Japanese invasion of Burma and the allied retreat in 1942, a few British army officers had been left behind in the Karenni as part of SOE section Force 136 headed by Colin Hercules Mackenzie in a hasty attempt to organise a "stay-behind" organisation known as the 'Oriental Mission'. This force had operated in the South-East Asia region occupied by Japan had been created to encourage and supply resistance movements. During the retreat the Oriental Mission occasionally mounted clandestine sabotage operations and were successful in delaying Japanese advances.

Operation Harlington was initiated in 1943 led by SOE British liaison officer, Hugh Seagrim who had stayed behind after the retreat and were able to successfully ambush Japanese patrols with impunity. The Japanese responded by executed a ruthless punitive expedition into the Karenni in August 1944, where they knew a British officer was operating. To spare the population Seagrim, voluntarily surrendered himself to the Japanese and was executed along with several of his Karen fighters. Nevertheless, the Karen fighters continued to resist and this influenced Force 136 to further supply and support them.

By the end of 1944, XIV Army commanded Major General Bill Slim had commenced the reconquest of Burma in Operation Capital. From November 1944 Operation Extended Capital took place - Meiktila and Mandalay were recaptured by March 1945. Despite this Slim was soon aware of the problems that the monsoon would bring to his forces and he resolved to get to Rangoon much further South before mid-May in Operation Dracula.

At the same time SOE had begun Operation 'Nation' which had been designed to facilitate the defection of the 'Burma National Army' (BNA) from the Japanese to the British side. Force 136 had made contacts with BNA leader Aung San with the help of the Karens and Burmese communists. In late March 1945, the BNA paraded with the Japanese in Rangoon and marched out ostensibly to fight the British in Central Burma. Instead, on 27 March, the 7,000 men openly declared war on the Japanese. SOE also influenced the Anti-Fascist Organisation (AFO) with Operation Billet to rise up in a now country-wide rebellion.

General Heitarō Kimura the Japanese commander of Burma Area Army realising this situation believed that his forces could hold up the XIV Army before the Monsoon. Following on from the success of 'Nation', Mackenzie planned a new operation to raise the Karen levies to support Slim's advance. Major Edgar Peacock was chosen to "train, plan and lead the Karens into their first action and show them how to do it." Peacock had worked as a Forestry Officer in Burma before the war, which included lengthy tours in the jungle and so knew the various tribes including the Karenni. He had successfully led P-Force in the Chindwin from 1943 before being pulled out due to the Japanese Operation U-Go offensive in March 1944.

SOE would be joined by the Jedburgh teams who had served in North West Europe the previous year. The SOE portion were trained in Ceylon under the direction of Peacock. This was followed by the training of the Jedburghs and others, some of whom were Chindit veterans.

=== Plan ===
P Force became the nucleus for Character's specific task which were grouped into four distinct groups 'Otter', 'Walrus', 'Hyena' and 'Mongoose' in the Karen dominated hills and plains of Burma. They were to:

- To keep Fourteenth Army informed about Japanese dispositions.
- To harass the retreating enemy, when called upon to do so.
- To keep under surveillance from the Karen Hills the road and railway running south from Pyinmana to Pegu.
- To observe the road from Toungoo in the Sittaung river valley through the Karen Hills and bring in reinforcements coming through the Karen Hills to Bawlake and Loikaw.
- To be prepared to oppose Japanese reinforcements coming up from the south or Japanese forces moving down from north and central Burma.

Character involved the parachute delivery of the SOE teams but also the three-man Jedburghs into the Karenni to organise large-scale resistance. They would be facing elements of Lieutenant General Renya Mutaguchi's XV Army. With airfields secured in the recent reconquered areas in Burma - Dakota C-47 transport aircraft would be used for resupply. In addition, No. 357 Squadron RAF (Special Duties) operated out of India to fly into Burma using Westland Lysander single-engined liaison aircraft. The Lysander could be used over shorter distances and were able to land on smaller quickly cleared areas for makeshift runways.

== 'Character' ==
In late February 1945, the Character teams jumped from C-47 aircraft and after landing began to rally the local Karen people. Two RAF Squadrons from Jessore and Comilla flew in further supplies, weapons and officer reinforcements. By the end of February sixty teams had parachuted into the mountains and within a month they had established a sophisticated intelligence network across nearly 7,000 square miles of jungle-covered mountains. Most of the team were British, but did include Indians, Gurkhas and eight Canadians. The 'Character' force was to only attack when ordered to do so in order to coincide with Slim's XIV Army's strike for Rangoon.

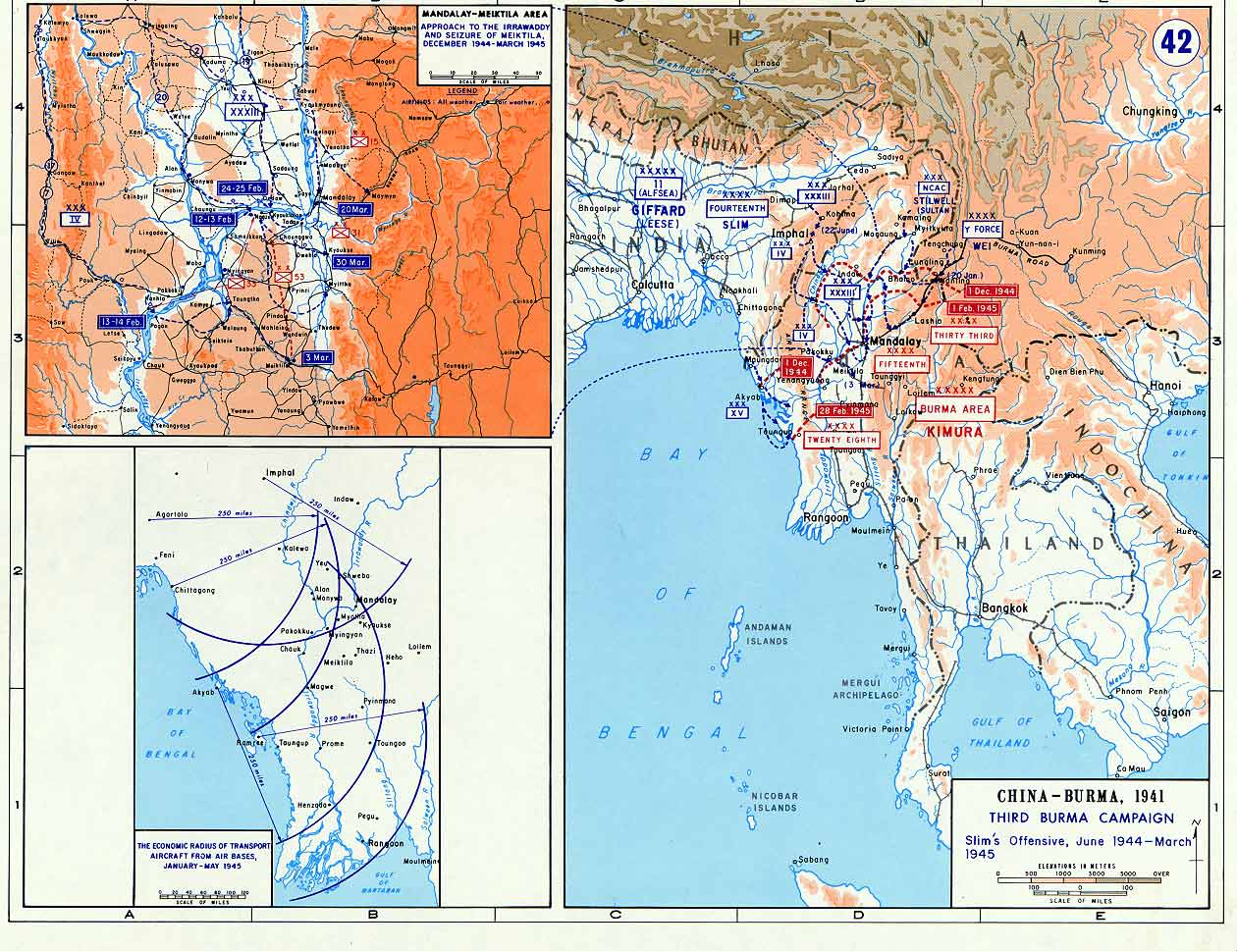
Burma Campaign June 1944-May 1945

=== Walrus, Hyena, Otter and Mongoose ===
'Walrus', commanded by Tulloch, was the northernmost, its area lying north of the Mawchi road between Bawlake and Loikaw. They had jumped on 19 March with nineteen men, two majors, a second Lieutenant, three sergeants and some fourteen men from the Burma Sappers and Miners. Another drop zone had been established a few miles south of Loikaw. Tulloch soon gained the confidence of the local chiefs, and by 13 April Tulloch's Northern group had some 2,000 guerrillas. They were ordered to block Japanese movements along the Loikaw-Mwachi road.

'Otter', commanded by Peacock, was responsible for both sides of the Mawchi road from the foot-hills near Toungoo to Bawlake. Peacock was joined by Lieutenant Cromarty and Major Turrall. A new area 'Ferret' was to be established in the Northern sector at Hoya, north of the Tongou-Mwachi road and South West of Loikwa. Commanded by Major William Eustace Poles, they arrived at their allotted location, but McKenzie however changed his mind and ordered him to join Peacock at 'Otter', and Poles was to remain under Peacock's command.

'Walrus' and 'Otter' saw most of the action in the early stages. The Japanese soon had learnt of SOE's establishment at 'Otter's base on the top of the 7,500ft peak Mount Sosiso. This stronghold overlooked the Mandalay-Rangoon Road and was attacked in March, by a Japanese Company some 180 men. After two days of failed attacks the Japanese withdrew after suffering heavy casualties, Peacock's force lost one dead and five injured. Otter therefore had to limit itself to hit and run tactics for a while.

'Hyena', commanded first by Turrall and then by Lieutenant-Colonel H. W. Howell (formerly with the Kailan Mining Administration in China), operated round Pyagawpu. The Japanese became aware of the parachute drops and sent out patrols to investigate. After interrogating villagers many of the Karens then hid their women and livestock in the jungle before the Japanese arrived. Turrall arranged for the group to establish a base on Mount Plakho. A makeshift runway strip was constructed at Lipyeki village for Lysander aircraft to land and take off with ease.

'Mongoose', the last area to be formed, operated in the Papun-Shwegyin-Bilin area. Its headquarters was at Papuan was commanded by Lieutenant-Colonel R. A. Critchley, a regular soldier who had served in the East African Campaign with Reginald Wingate.

=== Race to Toungoo ===
On April 13, Slim's force began their advance in the plains heading for Rangoon. They sent word to the Character team that the Japanese 15th Division were being sent down from the Shan States. There was now a race for Toungoo by the British and Japanese. The SOE and Karen forces of 'Otter' and 'Walrus' launched devastating ambushes on this road to Toungoo, destroying truckloads of infantry, blowing up bridges and laying booby traps, creating havoc amongst the Japanese. Turrall with the 'Hyena' group meanwhile had learned that the town of Kyuakkyi in the Sittaung valley had a large Kempeitai headquarters. On April 15, Turrall launched an attack on the town which was a success, killing some forty Japanese and rescuing a number of Karens. After briefly occupying the town Turrall withdrew - he was slightly wounded along with a small number of Karens killed and wounded. The success of the attack brought in more Karen volunteers.

The Character teams had successfully delayed the Japanese by seven days who never reached Toungoo. On April 23, British IV Corps reached the town three days ahead of schedule. The Japanese now had to regroup and block the Allied advance on Rangoon. However, the monsoon had started earlier than expected which hampered further operations, and air power was grounded. Character too was impeded and limited patrols were conducted. Conditions by the end of April had cleared and the No. 221 Group RAF were able to strike on targets pinpointed by the Character teams. One of the most notable was the attack on the Rangoon-Mandalay railway station at Pyu where a Japanese troop train had just come in. Hurricane and Spitfire fighter bombers attacked in waves causing considerable damage, inflicting some 1,000 Japanese casualties.

Rangoon was captured on 3 May by an amphibious and airborne assault in Operation Dracula, with little resistance as the Japanese had retreated several days later. The Japanese were forced to retreat along the Mandalay-Rangoon road to move from the hills into the plains and therefore closer to the Character teams. Karen resistance fighters continued to harass Japanese units and stragglers. The severely reduced Japanese Burma Area Army nevertheless remained in control of Tenasserim province in Central Burma.

=== Japanese pressure ===
XIV Army was not able to support Character further as plans were drawn up for the latter's withdrawal. This was in preparation for Operation Zipper, the planned invasion of Malaya by amphibious assault, which was due to take place in mid to late August. This formation was now being transferred over to the newly formed Twelfth Army led by Lieutenant-General Sir Montagu Stopford. A further issue arose in May as a shortage of supply-dropping aircraft and the poor conditions to fly during the monsoon threatened Character's survival. By this time some 12,000 guerrillas had been activated multiplying the supplies needed. This frustrated Peacock, Tulloch and the other area commanders.

The Japanese realising that XIV Army were not going to advance any further took advantage of the situation. They were able to regroup at Mawchi and brought in reinforcements from Moulmain. They made a concerted effort against Mongoose with some 1,500 to 2,000 troops hunting them but the Mongoose team held firm. To the east of Hyena near the Salween River the group under Major Roy Wilson found it difficult against the numbers of Japanese troops moving through the area. Despite a number of successful number of ambushes against the Japanese, his group was dispersed by aggressive Japanese tactics and so had to hide deeper in the jungle. The Japanese then attacked and raised a number of villages bringing in an influx of refugees to the Hyena headquarters. Nevertheless, Wilson was able to regroup at Daurakhu in June and casualties were few.

The Japanese also made a push to remove the Otter team from Sosiso in June. This time they used Karen levies to guide them, and captured a number of outposts causing the loss of Sergeant Charlesworth - a blow to the SOE. The Japanese however were driven back and the outposts were retaken.

=== Japanese breakout attempt ===
Kimura, now feared being trapped between the Pegu Yomas and the Sittaung and Irrawaddy Rivers by Stopford's newly formed XII Army. He also feared the destruction of the Lieutenant General Shōzō Sakurai's XXVIII Army which had retreated from the Arakan and was attempting to link up with the remnants of Lieutenant General Masaki Honda's XXXIII Army and Mutaguchi's XV Army in Tenasserim province. Kimura thus ordered a breakout so they could regroup and link with the Japanese occupation forces in Siam. XXVIII's Army's passage meant fighting their way through the Character team areas along the Sittaung valley.

The allies through various intelligence became aware of the breakout attempt by the Japanese in late June. Stopford's XII Army was ready for them as too were the Character teams particular Mongoose, Hyena and Walrus' zones which would be at the forefront of the breakout attempt. XII Army was able to support them, as well as aerial resupply by the RAF. The operation began on 4 July, XXXIII Army's attack was repulsed with heavy losses by Royal Artillery and RAF airstrikes. Then it was the turn of XXVIII Army but again they too were repelled with heavy losses.

On 25 July the Japanese made one last desperate attempt - XV Army stepped in to help XXVIII Army - they had to advance over the Sittaung River from the west and march southwards to Moulmein. The Shwegyin Chaung (riverbed) a tributary of the Sittaung in Mongoose's area was the site they had to cross. Critchley had organised for such an event and had some thirty Bren and Vickers machine guns in trenches lining some twenty miles of the eastern bank of the river. Some 3,000 Japanese fleeing east had an assortment of crossing types from bamboo raft and seized native craft. Being swept downstream by the strong current the Japanese would come across at least one of the machine guns posts, which opened fire. Some fifty airstrikes were also called in adding to the damage. Major Frederick Milner of 'Mongoose White' claimed it was 'one sided killing'. At one point ammunition ran so low an aerial resupply saved them from withdrawing. In one week the Japanese had lost some 1,250 killed attempting to cross the Chaung.

Hyena also saw action as some 9,000 Japanese descended into their area – ambushes and steady sniping caused more heavy losses. The breakout was a disaster, and by the end of the operation combined Japanese losses to airstrikes and guerrilla actions in the Mongoose area alone were well over half of the 3,000 men trying to cross the Chaung and with only a handful managing to get into the Pegu Yomas.

Only Otter was spared any serious action and as the breakout petered out the ragged elements were continually harassed by the Character teams and the RAF. After this mopping up operations took effect - many of the Japanese had turned to Cannibalism due to severe hunger.

=== Post surrender ===
With the majority of Burma having been liberated, there were some Japanese now in isolated pockets. Fighting albeit very frequent carried on even after the Japanese surrender on 15 August. Once the Japanese surrender had been announced, SOE's next task was to locate the pockets of Japanese in Burma cut off without communication. Despite information leaflets being dropped on these positions advising of the Japanese Government's surrender, fighting around Shwegyin and in other parts of the Karen Hills continued into September. A few days after the surrender, Turrall volunteered to walk into known Japanese lines and advised of the surrender. He was not believed and was held, tied up and beaten for around ten days. Turrall was eventually released after pamphlets were dropped by the RAF with details of the surrender and Turrall's name mentioned as Lieutenant-General Francis Tucker's personal representative.

The final action took place in Walrus' area on 23 August as the Japanese unaware of the surrender tried to advance towards Dawrawku. The Walrus team however were ready and a five-day battle developed. The Japanese suffered severe losses, and the Karen guerrillas even attacked elements from the Fifteenth Army who were also attempting to support. By this time losses in the rest of the breakout numbered some 14,000.

By the end of August surrendered Japanese soldiers were used by SOE - flown in Lysanders they parachuted into areas to communicate the surrender.

On 13 September 1945, the remaining units of the once formidable Japanese Burma Area Army surrendered. Major James Lucas of Mongoose took the surrender of 11,000 Japanese - Operation Character thus came to an end and with it the last operation of World War II.

== Aftermath ==
During Slim's 1945 campaign some 2,000 British, Indian and Burmese officers and soldiers, along with 1,430 tons of supplies, were dropped into Burma for the purposes of providing intelligence and for guerrilla operations. Operation Character was part of that campaign and achieved dramatic operational effect at a low cost in terms of men and equipment by helping to protect the flank of Slim's XIV Army as it advanced into southern Burma. By raising the local population and operating in difficult terrain, the Character teams assisted regular forces by inflicting significant casualties upon the Japanese, as well as psychological damage. Character turned out to be the most successful SOE operation of the entire war.

Character had accounted for nearly 11–12,000 Japanese killed and wounded, many of which succumbed to disease. Only eighteen unwounded prisoners were taken. Peacock's 'Team OTTER' alone were credited with 2,743 Japanese troops killed, many more wounded and 94 vehicles destroyed. Throughout the entirety of Operation Character, SOE lost only 20 officers and men killed or wounded. The number of Karen guerrillas and RAF personal involved brought the total to just under 200. For Force 136's operations in 1945 - Character, Nation and Billet claimed a total of some 16,000 Japanese losses.

Slim had earlier dismissed Force 136's actions unless it was closely coordinated with XIV Army's movements, especially when it came to airstrikes. This became an important lesson learned and one that worked well. SOE in this regards were not just intelligence gatherers but also worked in the same way that the Special Air Service (SAS) had done in northwest Europe the previous year. Slim noted on how Character became an asset for his campaign that led to the capture of Rangoon.

A number of officers, as well as Indian, Burman and Karen levies were awarded decorations for their actions in Operation Character. Peacock for one received a bar to his Military Cross, and after the war he was awarded the Distinguished Service Order for "outstanding courage and resource" in turning "a small hunted party into the controlling force" in his area of operations. Major Milner was awarded a Military Cross for his actions in the Battle of Shwegyin Chaung.

The lessons of Character were also telling - No. 221 Group RAF in particular was so impressed with Force 136's intelligence that they proposed that when operations would begin in Malaya, at least one squadron should stand by to carry out immediate strikes when a mobile target was reported. This was not something that had been done in Burma.

=== Post Burmese independence ===
At the Panglong Conference in 1947, an agreement was signed between Aung San as head of the interim Burmese government and the Shan, Kachin and Chin leaders, the Karen however were present only as observers.

After the independence of Burma from Britain in 1948, in January the following year the Karen National Union rebelled against the Burmese government, and the Karen Hills once again saw more action. They were even assisted by two former SOE officers (only one was identified - Tulloch). Under the guise of the Karen National Liberation Army - they fought on until 1995.

== See also ==
- Fort Hertz
- OSS Detachment 101

== Bibliography ==
- Aldrich, Richard J (2000). Intelligence and the War Against Japan: Britain, America and the Politics of Secret Service. Cambridge University Press. ISBN 9780521641869.
- Allen, Louis (1973). Sittang: The last battle. New York: Ballantine Books. ISBN 9780356042190.
- Atherton, Louise (1993). SOE Operations in the Far East An Introductory Guide to the Newly Released Records of the Special Operations Executive in the Public Record Office By. PRO Publications. ISBN 9781873162088.
- Bowsher, Jack (2025). Thunder Run: Meiktila 1945: The greatest combined arms manoeuvre battle of WW2. Chiselbury. ISBN 9781916556911.
- Cruickshank, Charles Greig (1983). SOE in the Far East. Oxford University Press. ISBN 9780192158734.
- Duckett, Richard (2019). The Special Operations Executive (SOE) in Burma Jungle Warfare and Intelligence Gathering in WW2. Bloomsbury. ISBN 9781788319881.
- Farquharson, Robert H (2004). For Your Tomorrow: Canadians and the Burma Campaign, 1941–1945. Trafford. ISBN 9781412015363.
- Fecitt, Harry (2019). Distant Battlefields The Indian Army in the Second World War. VIJ Books (India) PVT Limited. ISBN 9789388161787.
- Kratoska, Paul H, ed. (2012). Southeast Asian Minorities in the Wartime Japanese Empire 2012. Taylor & Francis. ISBN 9781136125140.
- Lyman, Robert (2021). A War of Empires: Japan, India, Burma & Britain: 1941–45. Bloomsbury Publishing. ISBN 9781472847157.
- Lyman, Robert (20 July 2023). The Reconquest of Burma 1944–45 From Operation Capital to the Sittang Bend 2023. Osprey Publishing. ISBN 9781472854070.
- MacLaren, Roy (2011). Canadians Behind Enemy Lines, 1939-1945. UBC Press. ISBN 9780774842419.
- O'Brien, Terence (1987). The Moonlight War: The Story of Clandestine Operations in Southeast Asia, 1944-1945. Collins. ISBN 9780002178037.
- Smith, Martin (1991). Burma: Insurgency and the Politics of Ethnicity. Bloomsbury Academic. ISBN 9780862328689.
- Stejskal, James (2022). No Moon as Witness: Missions of the SOE and OSS in World War II. Casemate. ISBN 9781612009537.
