= 49th Division (Imperial Japanese Army) =

- Active: 1944-1945
- Country: Empire of Japan
- Branch: Imperial Japanese Army
- Type: Infantry
- Garrison/HQ: Seoul
- Nickname(s): Wolf division

Commanders
- Notable commanders: Takehara Saburo

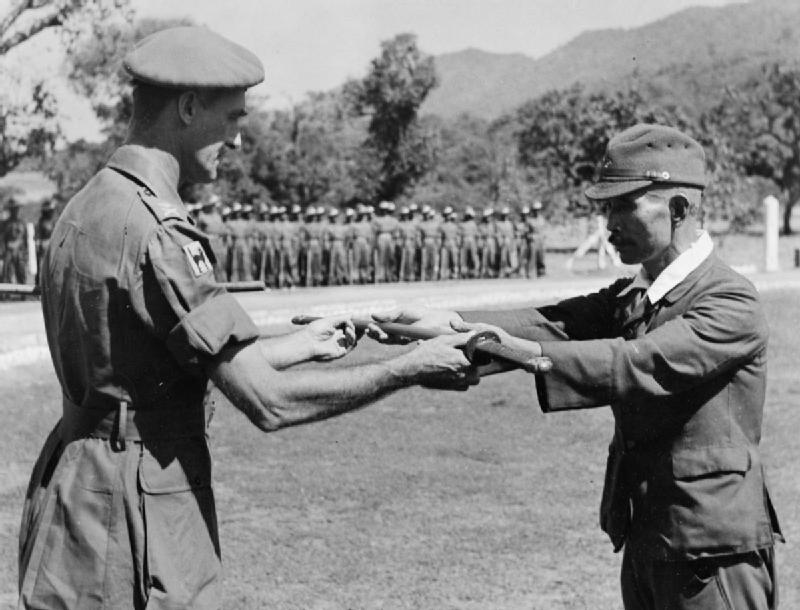
Lieutenant General Takehara, commander of the Japanese 49th Division, hands his sword to Major General Arthur W Crowther, DSO, commander of the 17th Indian Division, at Thaton, north of Moulmein, Burma, 1945

The 49th Division (第49師団, Dai-yonjūkyū Shidan) was an infantry division of the Imperial Japanese Army. Its call sign was the Wolf Division (狼兵団, Rō Heidan).

The 49th Division was formed 6 January 1944 in Seoul, around a nucleus formed from the 64th infantry brigade and the headquarters of the 20th division. The headquarters were located in Nara. About 2% of the soldiers were Korean locals.

In May 1944, the 49th division was subordinated to the Japanese Burma Area Army and ordered to Burma, reaching the ports of Singapore and Saigon in June 1944. During the transfer, two vessels were sunk, resulting in about 1600 deaths. On arrival in Burma, the 3rd Battalion of the 49th Mountain Artillery Regiment and the 153rd Infantry Regiment were sent to south-west Burma to protect local oil fields. The 2nd Battalion of the 49th Mountain Artillery Regiment and the 168th Infantry Regiment were assigned to the 33rd army for a delaying action. During the first week of March 1945, this detachment attempted to defend the vital communications centre of Meiktila against a complete Indian Infantry Division with a brigade of tanks. The detachment was almost wiped out, with only remnants of the 168th Regiment surviving. During the second week of March, they joined the HQ of the division, the HQ and 1st Battalion of the 49th Mountain Artillery Regiment and the 106th Infantry Regiment in attempts to recover Meiktila. Their attacks could not be coordinated with those of the other formations of 33rd Army and were broken off at the end of the month. During the first week in April, the division suffered further losses in attempts to hold a position near Pyawbwe.

After the survivors made their way to Southern Burma, they were involved in a diversionary attack during the Battle of the Sittang Bend. The division was still occupying fortified positions on the east bank of Sittang River when the surrender of Japan took place on 15 August 1945.

== See also ==
- List of Japanese Infantry Divisions

== Reference and further reading ==
- Madej, W. Victor. Japanese Armed Forces Order of Battle, 1937-1945 [2 vols] Allentown, PA: 1981
