= 18th Division (Imperial Japanese Army) =

Japanese infantry division

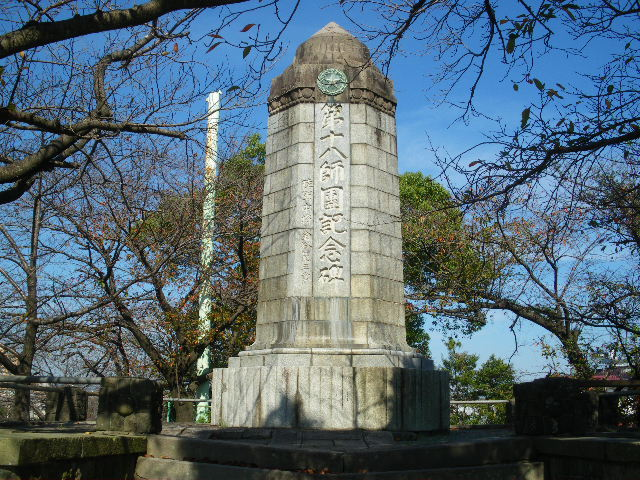
- IJA 18th Division Memorial, Kurume, Fukuoka
- Active: 13 November 1907 – 1 May 1925; 9 September 1937 – 1945
- Country: Empire of Japan
- Branch: Imperial Japanese Army
- Type: Infantry
- Size: Division
- Garrison/HQ: Kurume, Fukuoka, Japan
- Nickname: Chrysanthemum Division
- Engagements: World War I Second Sino-Japanese War; World War II: Fall of Singapore

The 18th Division (第18師団, Dai-jūhachi Shidan) was an infantry division of the Imperial Japanese Army. Its tsūshōgō code name was the Chrysanthemum Division (菊兵團, Kiku heidan). The 18th Division was one of two infantry divisions newly raised by the Imperial Japanese Army immediately after the Russo-Japanese War (1904–1905) as part of the post war expansion of the standing Japanese military. The division received its colors on 13 November 1907. Its original headquarters was in a suburb of the city of Kurume in Fukuoka Prefecture.

== Action ==
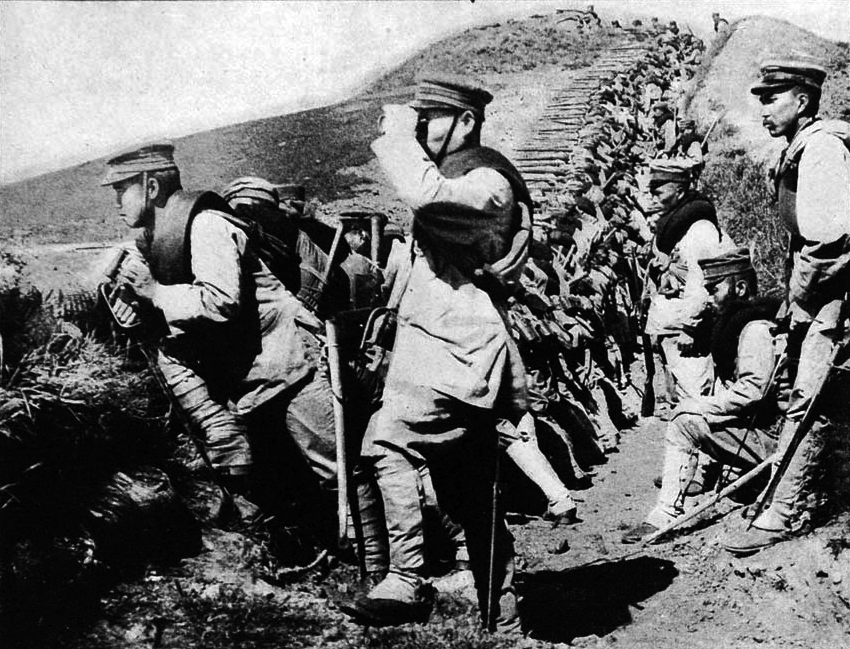
Soldiers of the 18th Division in an abandoned German trench during the Siege of Qingdao, 1914

In World War I the division was strengthened by an additional infantry brigade (the IJA 29th Brigade) and, led by Lieutenant General Kamio Mitsuomi, was given an independent command in the Siege of Qingdao of the German colony of Qingdao in the Shandong peninsula, China in October 1914, forcing a surrender of German forces after a week-long assault. Notably, an aircraft from divisional air force has become the first airplane ever downed in the air-to-air combat.

However, on 1 May 1925, the division was dissolved by Minister of War Ugaki Kazushige as part of a cost-saving measure during the Kato Takaaki administration, together with the 13th, 15th and 17th divisions.

The 18th Division was resurrected in September 1937 as a square division as a part of general military build-up following the start of the Second Sino-Japanese War. As part of the IJA 10th Army under the overall command of the Japanese Central China Area Army it was deployed to China, as an emergency reinforcement force to supplement the Japanese Shanghai Expeditionary Army in China after the Second Shanghai Incident. The Japanese 18th division subsequently participated in the Battle of Nanjing and the subsequent atrocities known as the Nanjing Massacre. From September 1938, the division came under the control of the IJA 21st Army, and participated in the Canton Operation and the invasion and occupation of Guangdong Province under the command of Lieutenant General Seiichi Kuno. The division remained in China through the 1939–40 Winter Offensive under the command of Lieutenant General Harukichi Hyakutake.

From 6 November 1941 the division came under the command of Lieutenant-General Renya Mutaguchi and was reassigned to the IJA 25th Army (which was under the command of General Yamashita Tomoyuki). It participated in the invasion of Malaya and Singapore. The 124th Infantry Regiment and some other units of the 18th Division took part in the Battle of Borneo from 16 December 1941 on. Following the conquest of Singapore, the division was transferred to the IJA 15th Army for the invasion of Burma, where it suffered over 3000 casualties, primarily from malnutrition and malaria in securing control of the Ledo Road. The supply situation was so bad that some elements of the division stole rations and weapons from the stores of 53rd division, in Tanai Township earning for themselves the nickname of "thief troopers".

In 1942, the division's Kawaguchi Detachment (the 35th Infantry Brigade and 124th Infantry Regiment) was detached and sent to Sarawak, the Philippines and finally to Guadalcanal. There, it took heavy losses in the battles of Edson's Ridge and Henderson Field. After the detachment, the main body of the division was converted to the triangular division format in 1943, while the detachment became the 31st division.

Late in 1943, Mutaguchi was promoted and replaced as commander of the division by Lieutenant-General Shinichi Tanaka. Transferred to the IJA 33rd Army, and operations in northern Burma, the 18th Division fought against the American-led Chinese divisions advancing on Mogaung and Myitkyina, and against the British Chindits operating behind their lines. Although suffering heavy losses, the division nevertheless inflicted many casualties and imposed severe delays on the Allies. Especially hit was the 114th Infantry Regiment which suffered about 2000 combat casualties while holding an important rail and road hub of Myitkyina in 1944 while under command of the 56th division.

The Japanese 18th Division incurred severe losses during joint Chinese-American-British operations in northern Burma. According to what are regarded as the most authoritative Japanese accounts of the campaign Kikutsubasa no Hei: Furuihi no Tatakai (The Chrysanthemum Soldiers: The Battle of Furuhi”) and Kikutsubasa no Hei: Kikka no Tatakai (The Chrysanthemum Soldiers: The Battle of the Chrysanthemums), both written by former 18th Division staff officer Ushiyama Saitarō. These works function as quasi-official divisional histories noted for their clarity and quality.

Ushiyama states that by the end of the Battle of Hukawng Valley (Battle of Northern Burma and Western Yunnan), culminating in the Siege of Myitkyina, the 18th Division had been mauled as the division’s "heroic spirit had reached ten thousand pillars". In his separate volume Burma Vertical Operation, Ushiyama estimates that up to the opening of the India-Burma Road, Japanese forces fighting in the Hukawng direction (i.e., northern Burma) suffered roughly 20,000 combat deaths and approximately 10,000 deaths from disease and starvation in Yunnan.

Even after the India-Burma Road was reopened, the Chinese Nationalist Army continued to fight the Japanese in northern Burma. The unit histories of the 18th Division’s three infantry regiments record additional losses-more than seven to eight thousand killed in combat against Chinese forces (whom the Japanese still habitually referred to as the “Expeditionary Force in India”).

The 114th Infantry Regiment, the principal component of the Myitkyina Garrison, records in its official diaries 2,979 killed, 1,821 wounded, and 107 taken prisoner during the defense of Myitkyina from May to August 1944.

In the aftermath of the disastrous Battle of Imphal in March–July 1944, Lieutenant-General Shinichi Tanaka was replaced by Lieutenant-General Eitaro Naka, formerly Chief of Staff of the Burma Area Army. In the 1945 campaigning season, the division once again lost many thousands of men in the Battle of Central Burma, particularly at Meiktila, south of Mandalay. During the battle, the division was reinforced by 119th infantry regiment from the 53rd division in attempts to recapture Meiktila from the Allies.

The 18th division ended the war in southern Burma. Of the 31,444 men of the division sent to Burma, more than 20,000 died.

== See also ==
- List of Japanese Infantry Divisions
