= Battle of Meiktila and Mandalay =

Engagements near the end of the Burma Campaign during WWII

Battle of Central Burma
- Part of the Burma campaign, South-East Asian and Pacific Theaters of World War II
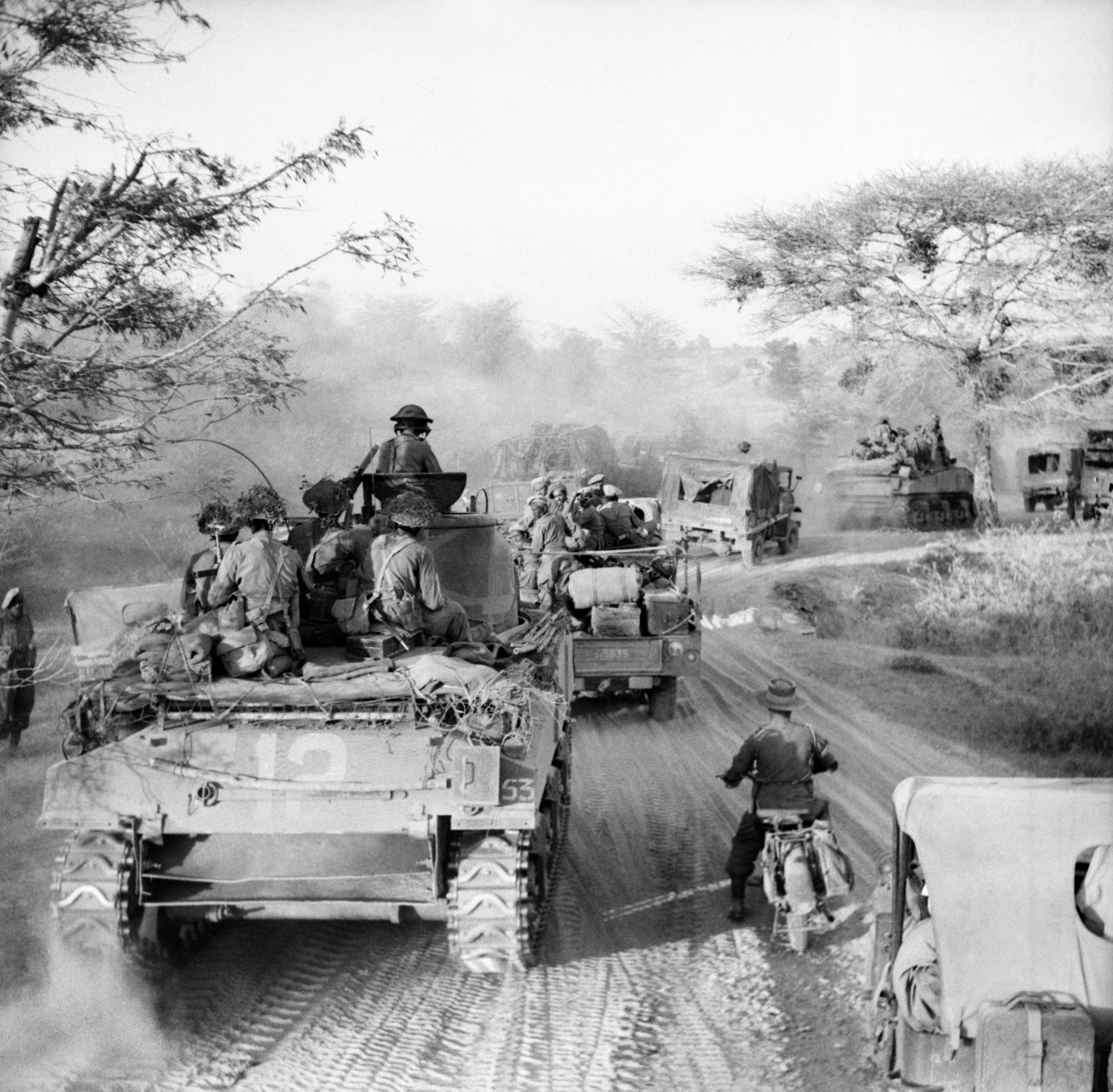
- Sherman tanks and trucks of 63rd Motorised Brigade advancing from Nyaungyu to Meiktila, March 1945
Date	January–March 1945
Location	Central Burma
Result	Allied victory

Belligerents
United Kingdom: British India; United States	Japan: Azad Hind; (Indian National Army)

Commanders and leaders
(United Kingdom) William Slim	(Empire of Japan) Heitarō Kimura

Casualties and losses
2,307 killed 15,888 wounded and missing	6,513 killed 6,299 wounded and missing

The concurrent Battle of Meiktila and Battle of Mandalay were decisive engagements near the end of the Burma campaign during World War II. Collectively, they are sometimes referred to as the Battle of Central Burma. Despite logistical difficulties, the Allies were able to deploy large armoured and mechanised forces in Central Burma, and also possessed air supremacy. Most of the Japanese forces in Burma were destroyed during the battles, allowing the Allies to later recapture the capital, Rangoon, and reoccupy most of the country with little organised opposition.

== Background ==
=== Japanese situation ===
In 1944, the Japanese had sustained several defeats in the mountainous frontier regions of Burma and India. In particular, at the Battle of Imphal and Battle of Kohima, the Japanese Fifteenth Army had suffered disastrous losses, mainly resulting from disease and starvation.

The heavy Japanese defeat prompted them to make sweeping changes among their commanders and senior staff officers in Burma. On 1 September 1944, Lieutenant General Hyotaro Kimura was appointed commander of the Burma Area Army, succeeding Lieutenant General Masakazu Kawabe whose health had broken down. At this stage of the war, the Japanese were in retreat on most fronts and were concentrating their resources for the defence of the homeland. Kimura had formerly been Vice-Minister for War, and had held other posts with responsibility for mobilising Japanese industry for the war effort. It was hoped that he could use the rice fields, factories and oil wells of Burma to make the Japanese forces there logistically self-sufficient.

Lieutenant General Shinichi Tanaka was appointed to be Kimura's Chief of Staff, with day-to-day responsibility for operations. He had formerly commanded the 18th Infantry Division in Northern Burma, and had a reputation for inflexible determination. (Note: In December 1942 Tanaka, then the Chief of Operations on the IJA General Staff, physically assaulted other officers who wished to withdraw from the Guadalcanal campaign. On that occasion Kimura, Vice Minister for War, was conciliatory and accepted blame for providing insufficient transport.) (In a reversal of roles in the aftermath of the Imphal disaster, the former Chief of Staff of the Burma Area Army, Lieutenant General Eitaro Naka, was transferred to command the 18th Division.)

Japanese losses in Burma and India in 1944 had been catastrophic. They were made up with drafts of conscripts, many of whom were not of the best physical categories. Kimura's staff decreed that their divisions in Burma should have a strength of 10,000 (compared with their paper establishment of nearer 25,000), but most divisions mustered barely half this reduced strength. Furthermore, they lacked anti-tank weapons. To face massed Allied armour, they would be forced to deploy their field artillery in the front line, which would affect their ability to give concentrated fire support to the infantry. Expedients such as lunge mines (an explosive charge on the end of a long pole), or suicide attacks by men wearing explosive charges, were not effective if the enemy tanks were closely supported by infantry.

Other losses handicapped the Japanese. Their 5th Air Division, deployed in Burma, had been reduced to only a few dozen aircraft to face 1,200 Allied aircraft. Their 14th Tank Regiment possessed only 20 tanks.

Kimura accepted that his forces stood little chance against the numerically and materially superior Allies in open terrain. He therefore intended that while the Twenty-Eighth Army defended the coastal Arakan Province, relying on the difficult terrain to slow the Allied advances, and the Thirty-Third Army continued to fight rearguard actions against the American and Chinese forces which were trying to open a land route from India to China, the Fifteenth Army would withdraw behind the Irrawaddy River. He hoped that the Allies would be overstretched trying to overcome this obstacle, perhaps to the point where the Japanese might even attempt a counteroffensive.

=== Allied situation ===
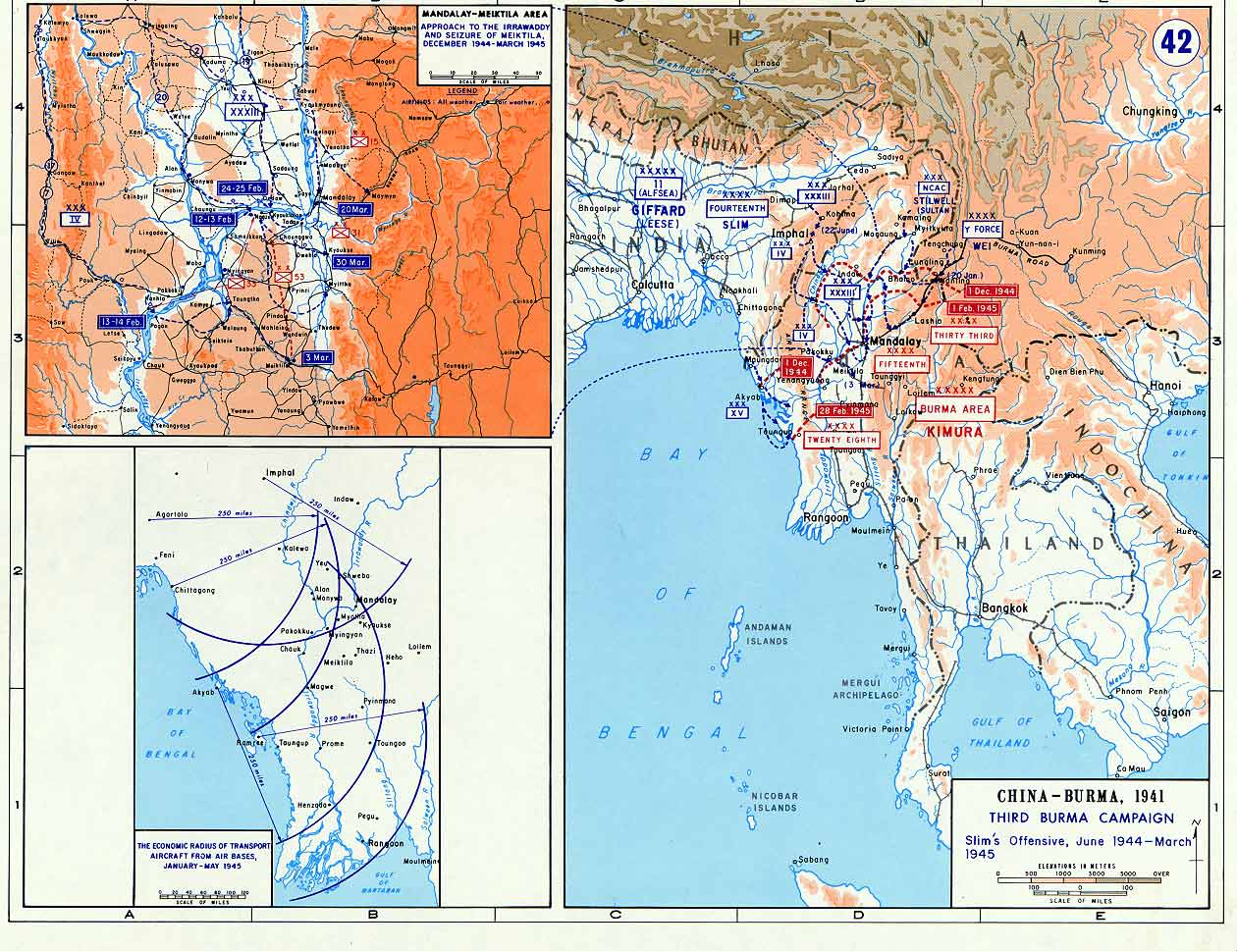
Series of maps showing the progress of the battles and their relation to the South East Asian theatre of war

The Allied South East Asia Command had begun making plans to reconquer Burma as early as June 1944 (while the Battle of Imphal was still being fought, although its outcome was clear). Three main options were proposed. One was to reoccupy Northern Burma only, to allow the Ledo Road to be completed, thus linking India and China by land. This was rejected, as it could use only a fraction of the available forces and fulfilled only an out-of-date strategic aim. A second option was to capture Rangoon, the capital and main seaport, by a seaborne invasion. This was also impractical, as it would require landing craft and other resources which would not be available until the end of the War in Europe. By default, the plan adopted was for an offensive into Central Burma by the British Fourteenth Army under Lieutenant General William Slim, to reconquer Burma from the north. The operation, originally codenamed Operation Capital, which was intended to capture Mandalay in Central Burma, was renamed Operation Extended Capital to encompass a subsequent pursuit to Rangoon.

In support of Fourteenth Army's offensive, the Indian XV Corps would advance in the coastal province of Arakan. The corps was also ordered to seize or construct airfields on the coast and on islands just offshore, which could be supplied by sea and which would be used as bases from which aircraft would supply Slim's troops. The American-led Northern Combat Area Command, consisting mainly of Chinese troops, would continue its advance to link up with Chinese armies attacking from Yunnan province in south-west China and thus complete the Ledo Road linking China and India. It was hoped that XV Corps and the NCAC would distract as many Japanese forces as possible from the decisive front in Central Burma.

The chief problems which Fourteenth Army would face were logistical. The advancing troops would need to be supplied over crude roads stretching for far greater distances than were ever encountered in Europe. Although expedients such as locally constructed river transport and temporary all-weather coverings for roads (made from coarse hessian sacking material impregnated with bitumen and diesel oil) were to be used, transport aircraft were to be vital for supplying the forward units. Disaster threatened as early as 16 December 1944, when 75 American transport aircraft were abruptly transferred to China, where the Japanese Operation Ichi-Go was threatening American airfields. Although aircraft were hastily transferred from the Mediterranean theatre to replace those despatched to China, continuing threats to deprive Fourteenth Army of the support of American transport aircraft were to be a constant concern for Slim during the forthcoming battles.

The Fourteenth Army was supported by 221 Group RAF, which operated B-25 Mitchell bombers, Hawker Hurricane and P-47 Thunderbolt fighters and long-range Bristol Beaufighter fighter-bombers. They could also call upon the B-24 Liberator heavy bombers of the Far Eastern Strategic Air Force. The most important aspect of air support was probably the Combat Cargo Task Force, which included both British and American squadrons of transport aircraft, in particular the ubiquitous C47. Fourteenth Army required 7,000 sorties by transport aircraft every day during the maximum intensity of the fighting.

Most of Slim's divisions were on a mixed Animal and Mechanical Transport establishment, which allowed them to operate in difficult terrain but restricted their tactical speed of movement to that of marching men or mules. In anticipation of fighting in the open country of Central Burma, Slim reorganised two of his divisions (Indian 5th Division and Indian 17th Division) as partly Motorized infantry and partly Airportable infantry formations.

At this stage of the war, few British infantry reinforcements were available. In spite of expedients such as drafting anti-aircraft gunners into infantry units, the strength of Fourteenth Army's British formations and of the British units in its Indian formations was dropping, and Indian and Gurkha units were increasingly to bear the brunt of the actions which followed.

=== Intelligence ===
In the coming campaign, both the Allies and Japanese were to suffer from lack of intelligence about the enemy, and make incorrect assumptions about their opponent's intentions.

The Allies had undisputed air superiority. In addition to the results of aerial reconnaissance, they also received reports from behind enemy lines from the reconnaissance units V Force and Z Force and the resistance liaison organisation Force 136. However, they lacked the detailed information available to commanders in Europe through Ultra radio intercepts. Japanese radio security was good; rather than cipher machines such as the Enigma machine, which the Ultra operation was able to decipher on a large scale, they used "code books and then extremely tough enciphering methods to conceal the coded text..." Japanese formation headquarters also sent far less compromising radio traffic than their German (or Allied) counterparts. Only near the end of the battle, when the Japanese signal and staff arrangements largely collapsed, did the Allies gain significant signals intelligence. Also, the Allied armies in the field had too few Japanese linguists, to translate intercepted messages and captured documents.

On the other hand, the Japanese were almost blind. They had very few aircraft with which to fly air reconnaissance missions, and they would receive little information from the Burmese population which was becoming disillusioned and restive under Japanese military control. Some formations had set up their own intelligence organisations; for example, Twenty-Eighth Army had created a branch of the Hikari Kikan, known as Hayate Tai, whose agents lived deep under cover in the frontier regions of Burma and in some of the remoter regions of Southern Burma. However, these agents could not acquire or report information quickly enough to be tactically useful in a fast-moving mechanised battle.

== Campaign ==
As the monsoon season ended in late 1944, the Fourteenth Army had established two bridgeheads across the Chindwin River, using prefabricated Bailey bridges. Based on past Japanese actions, Slim assumed that the Japanese would fight in the Shwebo Plain, as far forward as possible between the Chindwin and Irrawaddy Rivers. On 29 November, Indian 19th Division launched British IV Corps' attack from the northern bridgeheads at Sittaung and Mawlaik, and on 4 December, Indian 20th Division under Indian XXXIII Corps attacked out of the southern bridgehead at Kalewa.

Both divisions made rapid progress, with little opposition. The 19th Division in particular, under Major General "Pete" Rees was approaching the vital rail centre of Indaw, 80 miles (130 km) east of Sittaung, after only five days. Slim realised at this point that his earlier assumption that the Japanese would fight forward of the Irrawaddy was incorrect. As only one of IV Corps' divisions had so far been committed, he was able to make major changes to his original plan. The 19th Division was transferred to XXXIII Corps, which was to continue to clear the Shwebo plain and attack towards Mandalay. The remainder of IV Corps, strengthened by Fourteenth Army's reserve divisions, was switched from the army's left flank to its right. Its task was now to advance down the Gangaw Valley west of the Chindwin, cross the Irrawaddy near Pakokku and seize the vital logistic and communication centre of Meiktila by a rapid armoured thrust. By seizing Meiktila he would strangle all supplies going north towards Mandalay and hasten the end of that battle and consequently the recapture of the whole of Burma. To persuade the Japanese that IV Corps was still advancing on Mandalay, a dummy corps HQ was set up near Sittaung. All radio traffic to 19th Division was relayed through this installation.

To allow the main body of their divisions to retreat across the Irrawaddy, the Japanese had left rearguards in several towns in the Shwebo Plain. During January, the Indian 19th Division and British 2nd Division cleared Shwebo, while the Indian 20th Division had a hard battle to take Monywa, a major river port on the east bank of the Chindwin. The Japanese rearguards were largely destroyed. The Japanese also retained a foothold in the Sagaing hills, north of the Irrawaddy near Mandalay.

Meanwhile, IV Corps began its advance down the Gangaw Valley. To conceal the presence of heavy units of IV Corps as long as possible, the advance of 7th Indian Infantry Division, which was intended to launch the assault across the Irrawaddy, was screened by the East African 28 Infantry Brigade and the improvised Lushai Brigade. Where these two lightly equipped formations met Japanese resistance at Pauk, the town was heavily bombed by Allied aircraft to soften up the defenders.

The route used by IV Corps required upgrading in several places to allow heavy equipment to pass. At one point, the trail of vehicles stretched from Pauk to Kohima, 350 miles (560 km) to the north by road.

=== Crossing the Irrawaddy ===
The 19th Indian Division had slipped units across narrow stretches of the Irrawaddy at Thabeikkyin on 14 January 1945 and Kyaukmyaung 20 miles (32 km) south (and 40 miles (64 km) north of Mandalay) the next day. They faced a stiff fight for some weeks against attempts by the reinforced Japanese 15th Division to counter-attack their bridgeheads. The crossings downstream, where the river was much wider, would require more preparation. The assault boats, ferries and other equipment for the task were in short supply in Fourteenth Army, and much of this equipment was worn out, having already seen service in other theatres.

Slim planned for 20th Division of XXXIII Corps and 7th Division of IV Corps to cross simultaneously on 13 February, so as to further mask his ultimate intentions. On XXXIII Corps' front, 20th Division crossed 20 miles (32 km) west of Mandalay. It successfully established small bridgeheads, but these were counter-attacked nightly for almost two weeks by the Japanese 31st Division. Orbiting patrols of fighter-bombers knocked out several Japanese tanks and guns. Eventually 20th Division expanded its footholds into a single firmly-held bridgehead.

In IV Corps's sector, it was vital for Slim's overall plan for 7th Division to seize the area around Pakokku and establish a firm bridgehead quickly. The area was defended by the Japanese 72nd Mixed Brigade and units of the 2nd Division of the Indian National Army, under Shah Nawaz Khan. The 214th Regiment of the Japanese 33rd Division held a bridgehead at Pakokku.

The crossing by Indian 7th Division (which was delayed for 24 hours to repair the assault boats), was made on a wide front. The 28th East African Brigade made a feint towards Yenangyaung to distract the Japanese 72nd Brigade while another brigade attacked Pakokku. However, both the main attack at Nyaungu and a secondary crossing at Pagan (the former capital, and the site of many Buddhist temples) were initially disastrous. Pagan and Nyaungu were defended by two battalions of the INA's 4th Guerrilla Regiment, with one held in reserve. At Nyaungu, 2/South Lancashire Regiment suffered heavy losses as their assault boats broke down under machine-gun fire which swept the river. Eventually, support from tanks of the 116 Regiment Royal Armoured Corps (Note: formerly the 5/9 (Strathbogie, Garioch and Strathdon) Battalion of the Gordon Highlanders, formed by the amalgamation of two territorial battalions in 1941) firing across the river and massed artillery suppressed the INA machine gun positions and allowed 4/15th Punjab Regiment to reinforce a company of the South Lancashire who had established a precarious foothold. The next day, the remaining defenders were sealed into a network of tunnels. At Pagan, 1/11th Sikh Regiment's crossing fell into disorder under machine gun fire from the INA's 9th battalion, but a boat carrying a white flag was seen leaving Pagan. The defenders wished to surrender, and the Sikhs occupied Pagan without resistance.

Slim noted in his memoirs that this action was "the longest opposed river crossing attempted in any theatre of the Second World War." Unknown to the Allies, Pagan was the boundary between the Japanese Fifteenth and Twenty-Eighth Armies. This delayed the Japanese reaction to the crossing.

Starting on 17 February, 255th Indian Tank Brigade and the motorised infantry brigades of 17th Division began crossing into 7th Division's bridgehead. To further distract Japanese attention from this area, the British 2nd Division began crossing the Irrawaddy only 10 miles (16 km) west of Mandalay on 23 February. This crossing also threatened to be a disaster due to leaky boats and faulty engines, but one brigade crossed successfully and the other brigades crossed into its bridgehead.

=== Orders of battle ===
At this point, the Japanese were hastily reinforcing their Central Front with units from the northern front (where the American-led Northern Combat Area Command had largely ceased its operations as its Chinese units were recalled to China) and with reserve units from Southern Burma.

Japanese Order of Battle	Allied Order of Battle
Burma Area Army (Lieutenant General Hyotaro Kimura); (under army command); 2nd Division (being withdrawn to French Indo-China); 49th Division (moving from Southern to Central Burma); 14th Tank Regiment; 4th Artillery Regiment; Fifteenth Army (Lieutenant General Shihachi Katamura); 15th Division (north of Mandalay); 31st Division (west of Mandalay); 33rd Division (Myingyan); 53rd Division (in local reserve, south of Mandalay); Twenty-eighth Army (Lieutenant General Shozo Sakurai); 54th Division (Arakan); 55th Division (Arakan and Southern Burma); 72nd Independent Mixed Brigade (Lower Irrawaddy Valley); Thirty-third Army (Lieutenant General Masaki Honda); 18th Division (moving to Central Burma); 56th Division (Shan States) ^{NB}; 24th Independent Mixed Brigade (withdrawing to Moulmein) ^{NB}; Indian National Army; 2nd Division (Mount Popa)^{NB} unit did not participate in battle in Central Burma	British Fourteenth Army (Lieutenant General William Slim); (under army command); 5th Indian Infantry Division (motorised/air-transportable) (joining IV Corps); IV Corps (Lieutenant General Frank Messervy); 7th Indian Infantry Division; 28th (East African) Infantry Brigade; Lushai Brigade (being withdrawn to India); 17th Indian Infantry Division (motorised/air-transportable); 255th Indian Tank Brigade (M4 Sherman tanks); XXXIII Corps (Lieutenant General Montagu Stopford); British 2nd Infantry Division (motorised); 19th Indian Infantry Division; 20th Indian Infantry Division; 268th Indian Infantry Brigade (motorised); 254th Indian Tank Brigade (Grant and Stuart tanks)

=== Capture of Meiktila ===
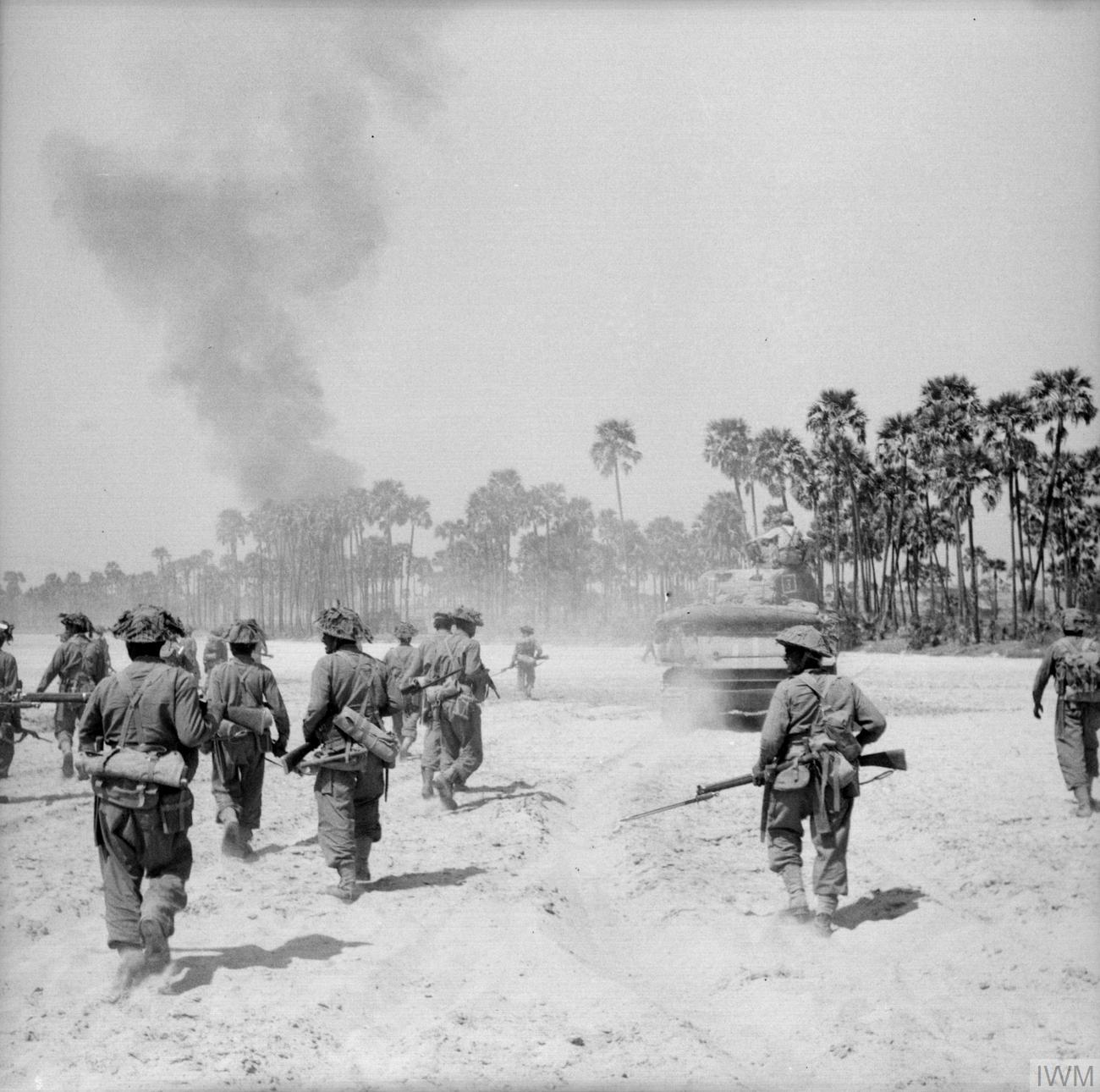
6/7th Rajput Regiment and tanks attack near Meiktila.

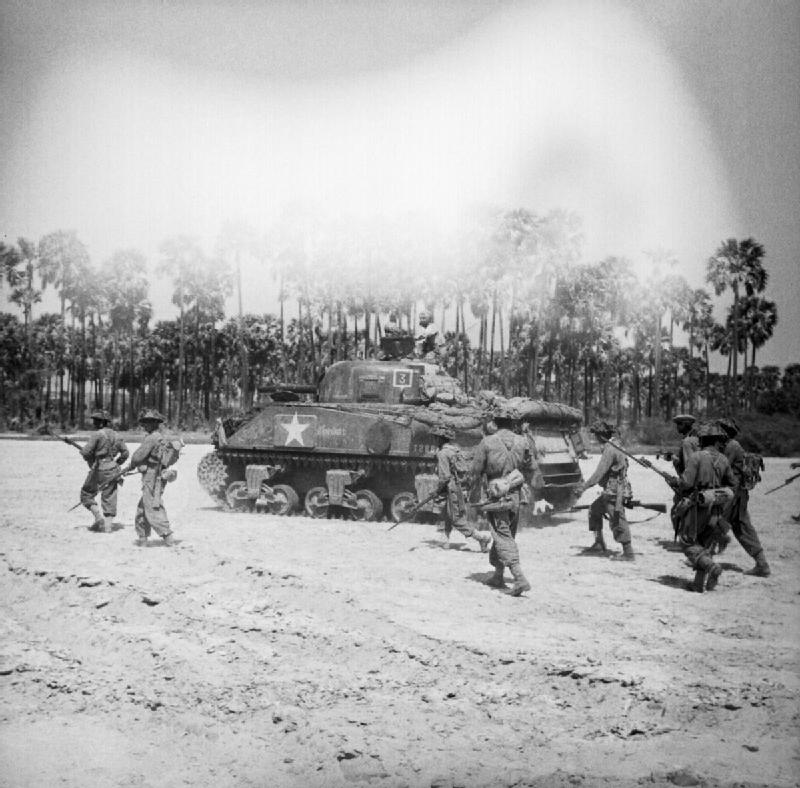
Punjab Rifles advance toward Meiktila under cover of a Sherman tank.

The Indian 17th Division, under Major General David Tennant Cowan, sallied from the Nyaungu bridgehead on 20 February and reached Taungtha, halfway to Meiktila, by 24 February. The division consisted of the 48th Indian Infantry Brigade and 63rd Indian Infantry Brigades, both of which were fully motorised, with the 255th Indian Tank Brigade (less a regiment left with 7th Division) under command.

At the same time, on 24 February, a Japanese high-level staff meeting was taking place in Meiktila, to discuss the possibility of a counter-attack north of the Irrawaddy. The Japanese command was undoubtedly surprised by the Allied attack. An agitated officer on Mount Popa signalled that 2,000 vehicles were moving on Meiktila. Staff at Fifteenth Army or Burma Area Army assumed this to be a mistake and deleted one of the zeroes, thinking that the attack was merely a raid. Burma Area Army had also ignored an earlier air reconnaissance report of a vast column of vehicles moving down the Gangaw Valley.

On 26 February, the Japanese became aware of the true size of the threat, and began preparing Meiktila for defence. The town lay between lakes to the north and south, constricting any attackers' front. The defenders numbered about 4,000 and consisted of the bulk of Japanese 168th Regiment from the 49th Division, and anti-aircraft and line of communication troops. While they attempted to dig-in, the Indian 17th Division captured an airstrip 20 miles (32 km) to the northwest at Thabutkon. The air-portable Indian 99th Brigade were flown in to the captured airstrip, and fuel was dropped by parachute for the armoured brigade.

Three days later, on 28 February, 17th Division attacked Meiktila from all sides, supported by massed artillery and air strikes. The 63rd Indian Brigade proceeded on foot to establish a roadblock southwest of the town to prevent Japanese reinforcements reaching the garrison, while the main body of the brigade attacked from the west. The 48th Indian Brigade attacked from the north down the main road from Thabutkon, although it was delayed by a strong position around a monastery on the edge of the town. The 255th Armoured Brigade, with two infantry battalions and a battery of Sexton self-propelled 25-pounder guns under command, left another roadblock to the northeast and made a wide sweep around the town to capture the airfields to the east and attack the town from the southeast. The bulk of the division's artillery (in a harbour northwest of the town, protected by units of the 99th Brigade) and air strikes were assigned to support 255th Brigade's attack.

After the first day, Cowan pulled the tanks out of the town during the night, although he left patrols to defend the area already captured. The next day, 1 March, Cowan had the Corps commander (Lieutenant General Frank Messervy) and General Slim watching anxiously over his shoulder at his headquarters, both worried that the Japanese might hold out for weeks. In the event, in spite of desperate resistance, the town fell in less than four days. Although the Japanese had plenty of artillery, they were unable to concentrate their fire sufficiently to stop any single attacking brigade. Lack of anti-tank weapons gravely handicapped the defenders. Slim later described watching two platoons from 1/7th Gurkha Rifles supported by a single M4 Sherman tank overrun several Japanese bunkers and eliminate their defenders in a few minutes, with only a few casualties to themselves. In an attempt to improvise anti-tank defences, some Japanese soldiers crouched in trenches, clutching 250 kg (550 lb) aircraft bombs, with orders to strike the detonator when an enemy tank loomed over the trench. Most were shot by an officer of 255 Brigade and Indian soldiers.

=== Japanese siege of Meiktila ===
The Japanese troops hastening to reinforce Meiktila were dismayed to find that they now had to recapture the town. The Japanese forces engaged were:

49th Division

106th Infantry Regiment
168th Infantry Regiment (remnants only)
49th Artillery Regiment

18th Division

55th Infantry Regiment
56th Infantry Regiment
18th Mountain Artillery Regiment
214th Infantry Regiment (attached from 33rd Division)
119th Infantry Regiment (attached from 53rd Division)
"Naganuma Artillery Group" (attached)

4th Infantry Regiment (from 2nd Infantry Division)
"Mori Special Force" (a battalion-sized long-range raiding force)

Many of the Japanese regiments, especially those of the 18th Division, were already weak after heavy combat in the preceding weeks. They numbered perhaps 12,000 men in total, with 70 guns. The Japanese divisions had no contact with each other, and lacked information on the enemy and even proper maps. In Meiktila, the Indian 17th Division mustered 15,000 men, about 100 tanks and 70 guns, and were to be further reinforced during the battle.

Even as the Japanese forces arrived, columns of motorised Indian infantry and tanks sallied out of Meiktila and attacked concentrations of Japanese troops, while attempting to clear a land route back to Nyaungu. There was hard fighting for several villages and other strong points. The attempt to clear the roads failed, and 17th Division withdrew into Meiktila.

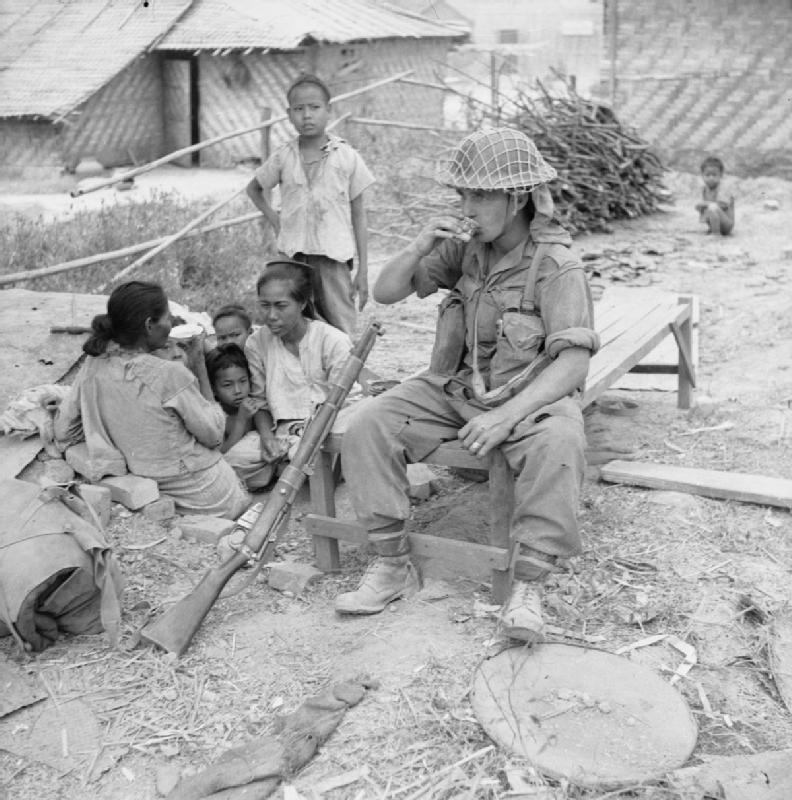
A Burmese family living in a dug-out share tea with a British soldier in Meiktila, 10 March 1945

The first attacks by the Japanese 18th Division (commanded by Lieutenant General Eitaro Naka) from the north and west failed, with heavy losses. From 12 March onwards, they attacked the airfields east of the town, through which the defenders were supplied by aircraft. 9th Indian Infantry Brigade (from Indian 5th Division) were flown into the airfields from 15 March to reinforce the defenders of Meiktila. The landings were made under fire, but only two aircraft were destroyed, with 22 casualties. The Japanese fought their way steadily closer to the airfields and from 18 March, Cowan suspended air landings (although casualties could still be evacuated in light aircraft from a separate, smaller, landing strip) and supplies were dropped by parachute to his division.

Meanwhile, on 12 March, Kimura had ordered Lieutenant General Masaki Honda, commanding the Japanese Thirty-third Army, to take command of the battle for Meiktila. Honda's HQ staff took control on 18 March, but without their signal units, they could not coordinate the attacking divisions properly. Attacks continued to be disjointed. They were further disjointed by the "attack-minded" defence; the defenders would sally out every day to attack any gathering concentration of Japanese in the surrounding villages, followed by an all round defence of the ground taken as this was then attacked in its turn by new concentrations of freshly arrived Japanese, before pulling back to the main town again. As this was happening all around the town, the defence of Meiktila soon resembled a Neapolitan Ice-cream with concentric circles of opposing forces with the result that nowhere could the Japanese form up in sufficient strength to mount a successful attack. The Japanese were using their artillery in the front line with their infantry, which accounted for several enemy tanks, but also resulted in the loss of many guns. During a major attack on 22 March, the Japanese attempted to use a captured British tank, but this was destroyed and the attack was repelled with heavy losses.

The strategic goal was achieved with the Japanese forces fighting in the north of the country cut off from any supplies and quickly withering on the vine.

Lieutenant Karamjeet Singh Judge of the 4th Battalion, 15th Punjab Regiment, British Indian Army was posthumously awarded the Victoria Cross (VC) for his deeds on 18 March during the battle.

=== Yenangyaung and Myingyan ===
While Meiktila was besieged, the other major unit of British IV Corps, the Indian 7th Division, was engaged in several battles to maintain its own bridgehead, capture the important river port of Myingyan, and assist 28th (East African) Brigade against counter-attacks on the west bank of the Irrawaddy. As Major General Tsunoru Yamamoto's 72nd Independent Mixed Brigade (reinforced by some units from the Japanese 54th Division from the Arakan), tried to retake the British foothold at Nyaungu, the 2nd Infantry Regiment of the Indian National Army under Prem Sahgal, reinforced by the remaining troops of the 4th Guerrilla regiment which had opposed the initial crossings of the Irrawaddy, were now tasked with protecting the exposed flank of Kimura's forces, as well as pin down British forces around Nyaungyu and Popa. Lacking heavy arms or artillery support, Sahgal's forces used guerrilla tactics, working in conjunction with small units from the Kanjo Butai (a regiment detached from the Japanese 55th Division), and were successful for some time.

The Indian 7th Division now faced the additional task of reopening the lines of communication to the besieged Indian 17th Division through the two roads that ran through the region and was forced to call off the attack on Myingyan. Around the middle of March, the leading motorised brigade of Indian 5th Division reinforced them, and began clearing the Japanese and the INA troops from their strongholds in and around Mount Popa to clear the land route to Meiktila.

Once contact was established with the defenders of Meiktila, the Indian 7th Division resumed the attack on Myingyan, which was captured after four days' fighting from 18 to 22 March. As soon as it was captured, the port and the Myingyan-Meiktila railway were repaired and brought back into use for supply vessels using the Chindwin.

=== Fall of Mandalay ===
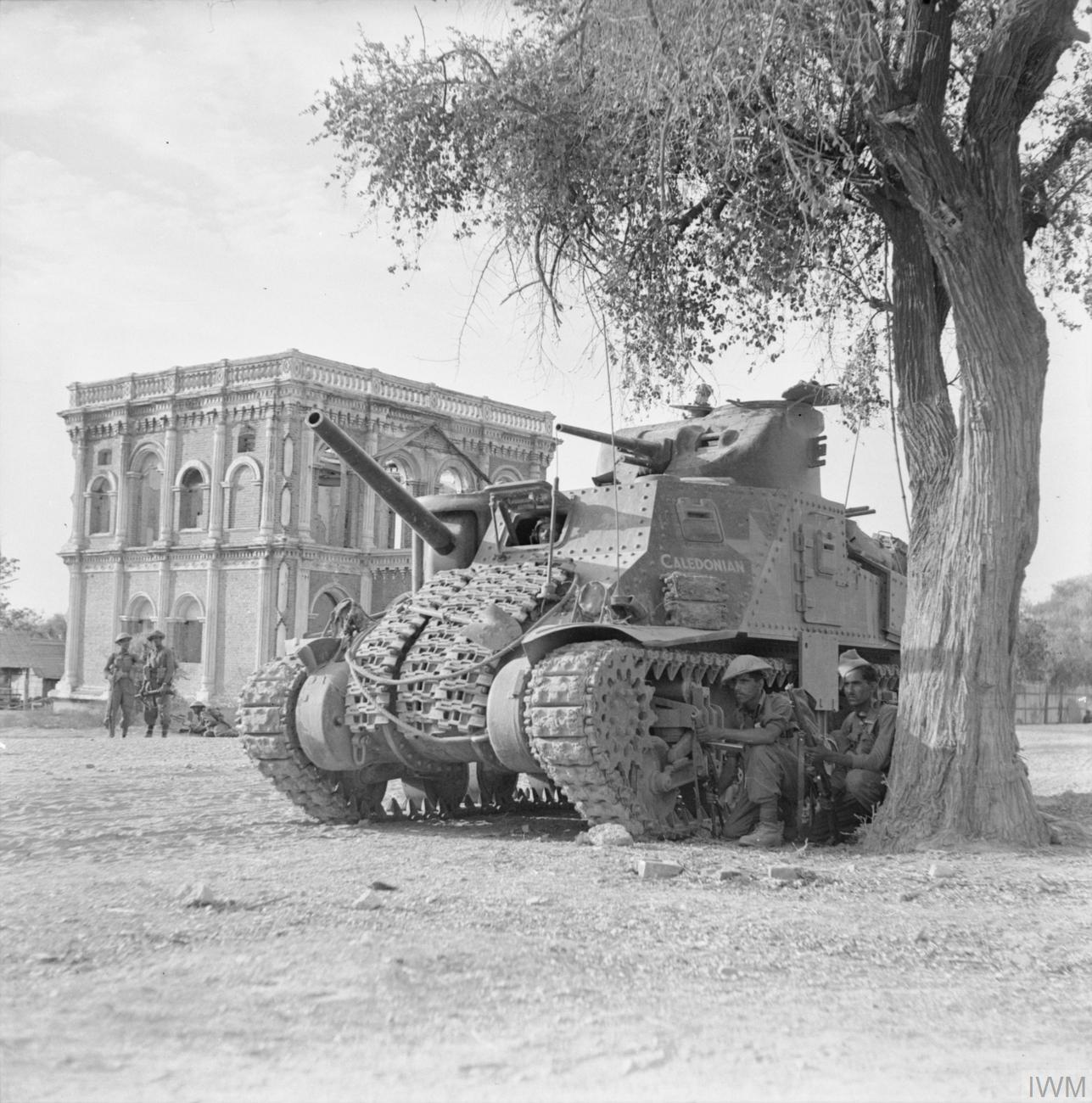
Infantry of 19th Indian Division along with a Lee tank in Mandalay, 9–10 March 1945

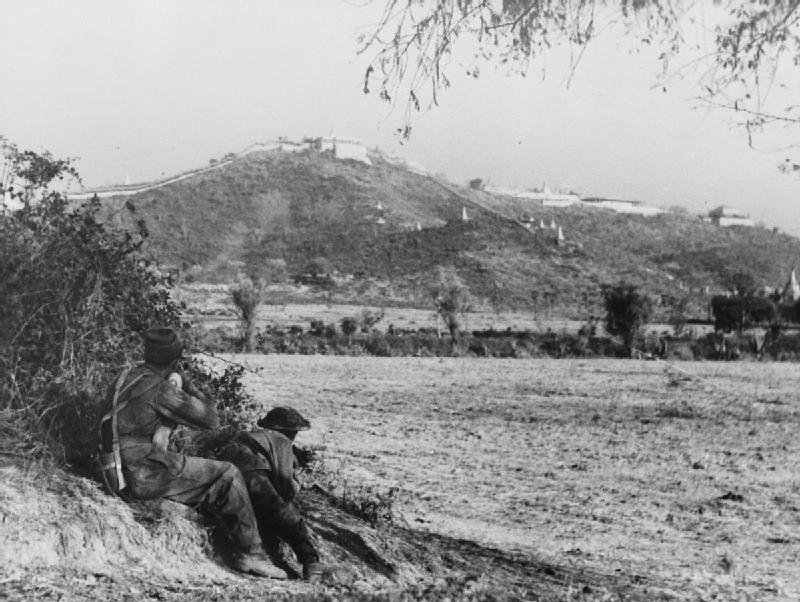
Troops of 19th Indian Division survey Japanese positions on Mandalay Hill.

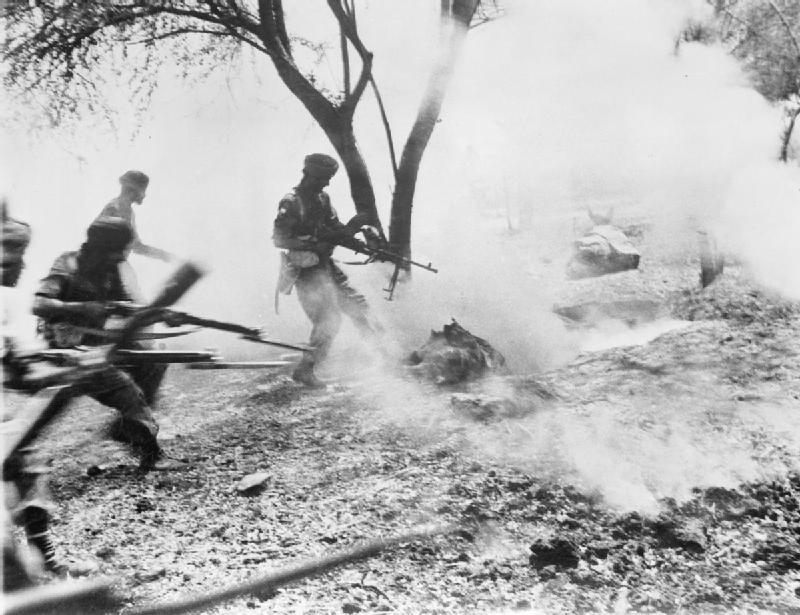
Indian troops clear a Japanese foxhole at Mandalay.

During late January, Indian 19th Division had cleared the west bank of the Irrawaddy, and transferred its entire strength into its bridgeheads on the east bank. By the middle of February, the Japanese 15th Division opposed to them was very weak and thinly spread, and General Rees launched an attack southwards from his division's bridgeheads in mid-February. By 7 March, his leading units were within sight of Mandalay Hill, crowned by its many pagodas and temples.

Lieutenant General Seiei Yamamoto, commanding the Japanese 15th Division, was opposed to defending the city, but received uncompromising orders from higher headquarters to defend Mandalay to the death. Lieutenant General Kimura at Burma Area Army was concerned about the loss of prestige should the city be abandoned. Also, there were still large supply dumps south of the city, which could not be moved but which the Japanese could not afford to abandon.

A Gurkha battalion (4/4th Gurkha Rifles), commanded by an officer who had served in Mandalay before the war, stormed Mandalay Hill on the night of 8 March. Several Japanese held out in tunnels and bunkers underneath the pagodas, and were slowly eliminated over the next few days, although most of the buildings survived substantially intact.

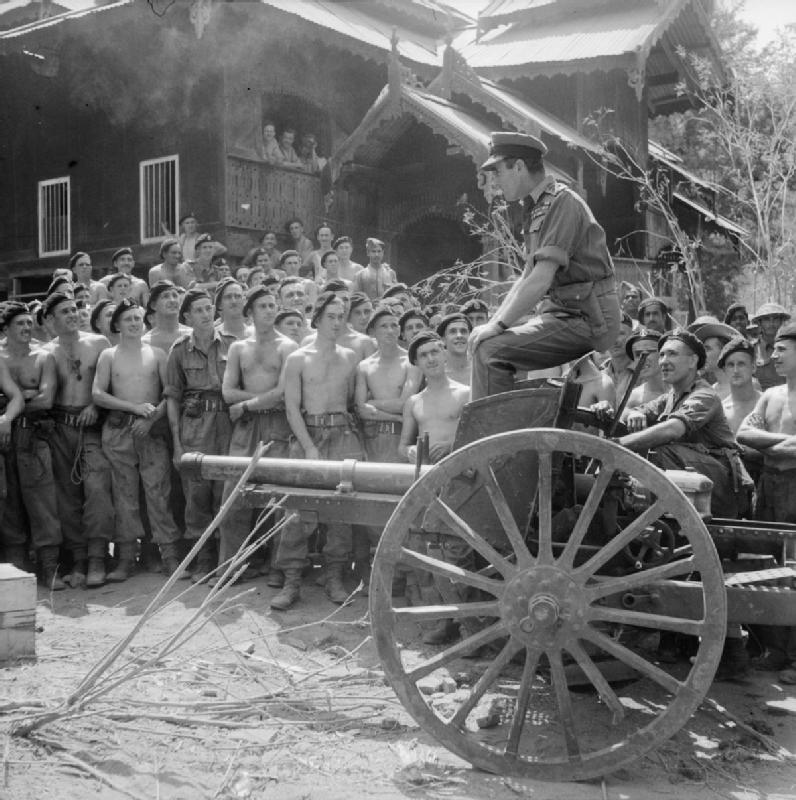
Admiral Mountbatten addressing men of the Royal Armoured Corps in Mandalay, 21 March 1945

Fighting its way further into the city, Rees's division was stopped by the thick walls of Fort Dufferin (as the ancient citadel was named by the British), surrounded by a moat. Medium artillery and bombs dropped from low altitude failed to make much impression on the walls and an assault via a railway tunnel near the angle of the north and west walls was driven back. An attempt was made to breach the walls by "skip bombing", using 2,000 lb bombs, but this created a breach only 15 feet wide. The 19th Division prepared to make another assault via the sewers on 21 March, but before the assault could be made, the Japanese abandoned the fort, also via the sewers. King Thibaw Min's teak palace inside the fort had burned down during the siege, only one of many historic buildings destroyed.

Elsewhere on XXXIII Corps's front, 20th Indian Division launched an attack southwards from its bridgehead. The Japanese 31st Division (with part of the 33rd Division) facing them had been weakened by casualties and detachments to the fighting elsewhere and was thrown into disorder. A tank regiment and a reconnaissance regiment from the 20th Division, grouped as "Claudecol", drove almost as far south as the Meiktila fighting, before turning north against the rear of the Japanese facing the bridgeheads. The British 2nd Division also broke out of its bridgehead and attacked Mandalay from the west. By the end of March, the Japanese Fifteenth Army had been reduced to uncoordinated remnants trying to move southwards to regroup in the Shan States.

== Aftermath ==
On 28 March, Lieutenant General Shinichi Tanaka, Kimura's Chief of Staff, conferred with Honda at Thirty-third Army HQ. Honda's staff told him that the army had destroyed about 50 British and Indian tanks, half the number of tanks in Meiktila. In doing so, the army had suffered 2,500 casualties and lost 50 guns, and had only 20 artillery pieces left. Tanaka accepted the responsibility of ordering Honda's army to break off the siege of Meiktila and prepare to resist further Allied advances to the south.

It was already too late. The Japanese armies in Central Burma had lost most of their equipment, and their cohesion. They would be unable to stop the Fourteenth Army exploiting to within striking distance of Rangoon. Furthermore, with the loss of Mandalay, the Burmese population finally turned against the Japanese. Uprisings by guerilla forces and a revolt by the Burma National Army, which the Japanese had formed two years previously, would contribute to the eventual Japanese defeat.
