= Edgar Peacock =

British Army officer (1893-1955)

Edgar Henry William Peacock
- Edgar Peacock in tropical service dress wearing the rank insignia of a Lt Colonel
- Born: 11 February 1893; Nagpur, India
- Died: March 1955 (aged 62); Umtali, Zimbabwe
- Military career
- Branch: British Army
- Rank: Lieutenant Colonel
- Service number: 318622
- Units: Royal Artillery 54 Nyasaland Battery; SOE
- Commands: Area Commander Otter Area; Operation Character Force 136
- Conflicts: World War II; Burma Campaign; Operation Character
- Awards: Distinguished Service Order; Military Cross and bar
- Spouse: Geraldine Peacock (m. 1924)
- Children: 2 (daughters)

Lieutenant Colonel Edgar Henry William Peacock, DSO, MC & Bar (11 February 1893 – March 1955) was a decorated British Officer commanding special forces operations behind Japanese lines in Burma during the Second World War. He had previously served in Burma for many years as Deputy Conservator of Forests, and Game Warden.

== Early life ==
Edgar Peacock was born in Nagpur, India on 11 February 1893. He entered the Indian Forest Service in 1914, training at the Forest Research Institute College at Dehra Dun and, upon graduation, took up his first posting in the Hinthada area.

In 1924, Peacock married his wife, Geraldine, in Rangoon, and then returned to his work as a Forest Officer. This included lengthy tours in the jungle on which his wife and new baby, Joy, accompanied him.

In 1932, Peacock retired from the forestry service and travelled to England with his family. They stayed there for six months while he wrote a book, A Game Book for Burma and Adjoining Territories, which was published in 1933 by H F & G Witherby and he also wrote a number of articles for The Field magazine, on both hunting and photographing game.

== War Service ==
Peacock served with SOE during the Second World War, largely in Burma where he commanded P-Force in the Chindwin River area, assisting 20 Division of IV Corps. P Force was withdrawn just before the Japanese attack on India in March 1944. After further training in Ceylon at the end of 1944, Peacock led Otter area of Operation Character, with responsibility for the foothills and the road leading east from Toungoo towards Bawlake. Here, his responsibility was to "train, plan and lead the Karens into their first action and show them how to do it."

During operations on the Chindwin front, Peacock was awarded a Military Cross after an incident in which one of his officers, Captain J Gibson, was seriously wounded by a grenade. Peacock crossed through enemy lines to get help before immediately crossing back through enemy lines to collect Captain Gibson, and then crossing through enemy lines for a third time to bring him to safety. He received a bar to his MC for later work in leading his guerilla force to destroy a column of Japanese soldiers moving through the area. After the war he was awarded the Distinguished Service Order for "outstanding courage and resource" in turning "a small hunted party into the controlling force" in his area of operations.
