= Thirty-Third Army (Japan) =

Japanese Thirty-third Army
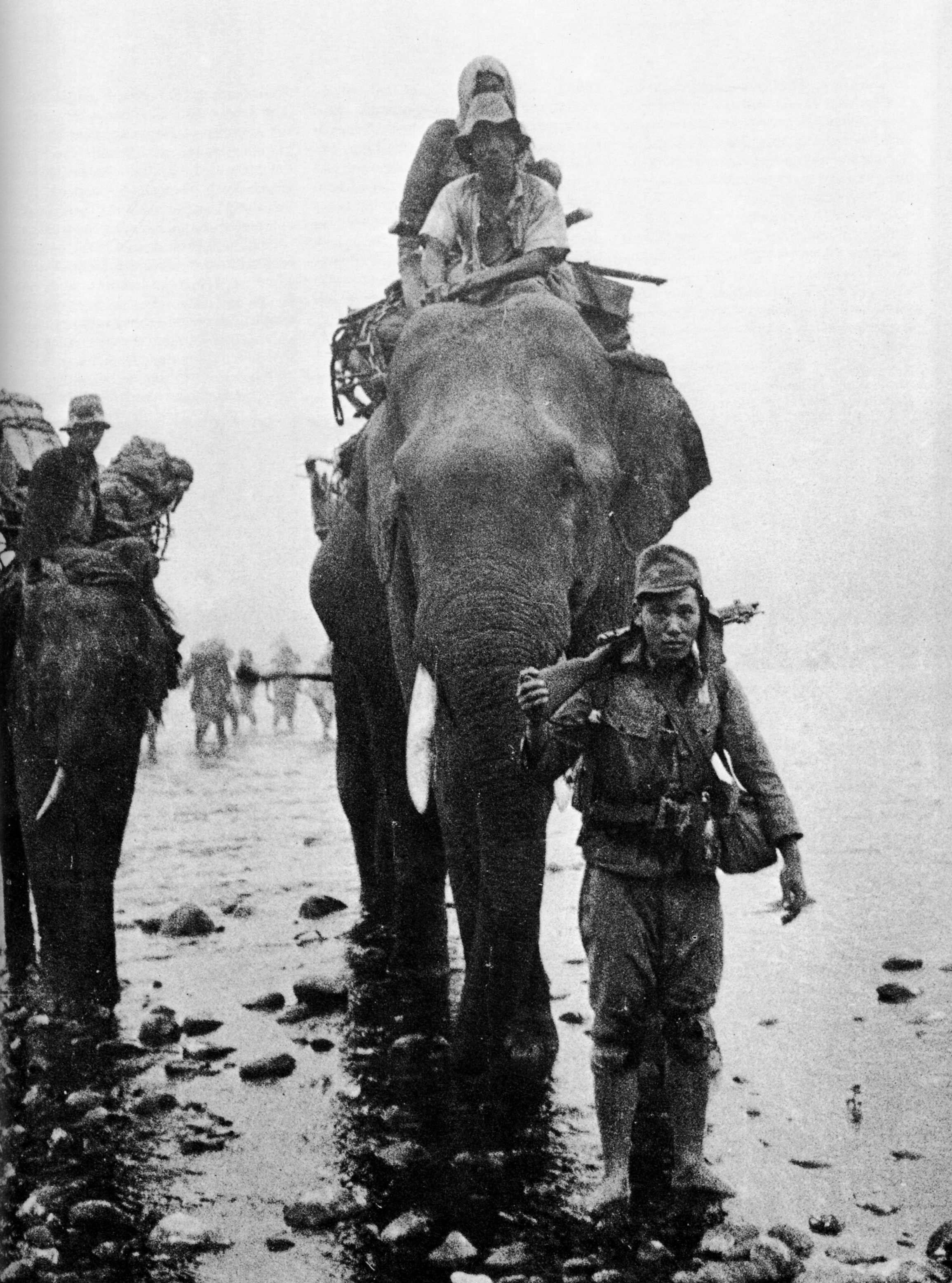
- Japanese troops on elephant in Burma
- Active: April 7, 1944 - August 15, 1945
- Country: Empire of Japan
- Branch: Imperial Japanese Army
- Type: Infantry
- Role: Corps
- Garrison/HQ: Thaton
- Nickname(s): Kon (昆, Descendant)

The Japanese 33rd Army (第33軍, Dai-sanjyūsan gun) was an army of the Imperial Japanese Army during the final days of World War II.

== History ==
The Japanese 33rd Army was raised on April 7, 1944 in Rangoon, Japanese-occupied Burma as a garrison force, and in anticipation of Allied attempts to invade and retake northern Burma. It was under the overall command of the Burma Area Army.

When first formed, the army controlled the 18th Division facing the American-trained Chinese force advancing from Ledo in India, and the 56th Division facing the Chinese armies in Yunnan province. It also commanded a scratch force known as "Take Force" facing the Allied long-range penetration forces (the Chindits) around Indaw. During May, the army was reinforced by the 53rd Division which took on the Chindits, and regiments from the 2nd Division and 49th Division which reinforced 56th Division.

Facing the various Allied threats, the army was unable to prevent the capture of Mogaung and Myitkyina, although they temporarily halted the Chinese offensive from Yunnan and crippled the Chindits as a fighting force.

As the war situation on the Pacific front grew increasingly desperate for Japan, the Imperial Japanese Army was unable to provide reinforcements and resupply to units south of the Philippines. The 33rd Army (as with all Japanese forces in Burma) was increasingly understrength and ill-equipped.

In March 1945, the Army Headquarters was unexpectedly called on to take charge of the forces around Meiktila, where the Japanese were trying to recapture the vital line-of-communication centre from British and Indian troops. The Army's signal units arrived only late in the battle, and the headquarters lacked adequate information. The Army was unable to coordinate the attacks by its hastily collected units. The Japanese attacks were repulsed and at the end of the month they were forced to break off the battle.

The weakened 33rd Army attempted to defend a position at Pyawbwe to delay Allied pursuit, but were outflanked by Allied armoured units and again forced to retreat. Finally, about the middle of April, pursuing Allied armour attacked the Army HQ at Pyinmana. Although the Army commander (Lieutenant-General Masaki Honda) and his staff escaped on foot by night, they could no longer effectively control the remnants of their units, which allowed Allied units to advance to within striking distance of Rangoon.

After the fall of Rangoon, the 33rd Army regrouped in Tenasserim. Although reduced to the strength of barely a regiment, the Army nevertheless mounted a counterattack across the Sittang River to aid a breakout by Japanese forces still trapped in Burma. After a week-long battle, the Japanese failed with heavy losses and withdrew their shattered forces from the flooded "Sittang Bend".

The 33rd Army was disbanded following the Japanese surrender in late 1945.

== List of commanders ==
=== Commanding officer ===
	Name	From	To
1	Lieutenant General Masaki Honda	8 April 1944	September 1945
2	Lieutenant General Yuzo Matsuyama	September 1945 (acting)	

=== Chief of staff ===
	Name	From	To
1	Major General Tadashi Katakura	8 April 1944	19 June 1944
2	Lieutenant General Seiie Yamamoto	19 June 1944	20 February 1945
3	Lieutenant General Rikichi Sawamoto	20 February 1945	September 1945
