= Heitarō Kimura =

Imperial Japanese Army general (1888–1948)

- 木村 兵太郎
- Born: September 28, 1888; Saitama, Japan
- Died: December 23, 1948 (aged 60); Sugamo Prison, Japan
- Education: Imperial Japanese Army Academy; Army Staff College
- Military career
- Allegiance: Empire of Japan
- Branch: Imperial Japanese Army
- Service years: 1908–1945
- Rank: General
- Units: Inspectorate of Artillery, Field Artillery School, Coastal Artillery School, Economic Mobilisation Bureau, Ordnance Bureau, Kwantung Army, Ministry of War, Supreme War Council
- Commands: IJA 22nd Artillery Regiment; IJA 32nd Division; Burma Area Army
- Conflicts: Siberian intervention; Second Sino-Japanese War; World War II; Burma campaign; Battle of Meiktila and Mandalay

Heitarō Kimura (木村 兵太郎, Kimura Heitarō; September 28, 1888 – December 23, 1948), also known as Kimura Hyōtarō, was a general in the Imperial Japanese Army during World War II. He was convicted of war crimes and sentenced to death by hanging.

== Biography ==
Kimura was born in Saitama Prefecture, north of Tokyo, but was raised in Hiroshima prefecture, which he considered to be his home. He attended military schooling from an early age, and graduated from the Imperial Japanese Army Academy in 1908. He went on to graduate from the Army War College in 1916 and was commissioned into the artillery. He served during the Japanese Siberian intervention of 1918–1919 in support of White Russian forces against the Red Army. He was subsequently sent as a military attaché to Germany.

From the late 1920s Kimura was attached to the Inspectorate of Artillery and an instructor at the Field Artillery School. He was selected as a member of the Japanese delegation to the London Disarmament Conference from 1929 to 1931. On his return to Japan, he was promoted to lieutenant colonel and assigned command of the IJA 22nd Artillery Regiment. From 1932 to 1934, he returned to the Field Artillery School, followed by the Coastal Artillery School as an instructor.

In 1935, Kimura first served in an influential role close to the centre of Japanese policy when he was appointed Chief of the Control Section in the Economic Mobilisation Bureau at the Ministry of War. The next year, he was appointed Head of the Ordnance Bureau. He was promoted to the rank of major general in 1936. He became a lieutenant general in 1939, and was assigned a combat command with the IJA 32nd Division in China from 1939 to 1940. From 1940 to 1941, Kimura served as Chief of Staff of the Kwantung Army in Manchukuo.

Kimura returned to the Ministry of War in 1941 as Vice Minister of War, assisting War Minister Hideki Tōjō in planning strategies for campaigns in the Second Sino-Japanese War as well as the Pacific War. From 1943 to 1944, he was a member of the Supreme War Council, where he continued to exert a major influence on strategy and policy.

Late in 1944, as the course of the war went against Japan after the disastrous Battle of Imphal, Kimura was again assigned to the field, this time as commander in chief of the Burma Area Army, defending Burma against the Allied South East Asia Command. The situation was not promising as Japanese forces were under severe pressure on every front, and the Allies had complete air superiority. Reinforcements and munitions were short, and Imperial General Headquarters entertained the unsupported hope that Kimura would be able make his command logistically self-sufficient.

Unable to defend all of Burma, Kimura fell back behind the Irrawaddy River to attack the Allies when their supply lines were stretched thin, a move which initially dislocated the Allied plans. Such was Allied material superiority that the main weight of the offensive was switched, and the vital positions of Meiktila and Mandalay were captured at the Battle of Meiktila and Mandalay. From that point, Kimura was only capable of delaying actions. He opted to preserve his forces rather than defend the capital, Rangoon to the last man. Promoted to the rank of general in 1945, he was still reorganizing his forces at the surrender of Japan in mid-1945.

After the end of World War II, Kimura was arrested by the Allied occupation powers and tried by the International Military Tribunal for the Far East for war crimes. The tribunal cited his role in planning the strategy for the war in China and Southeast Asia, and condemned him for laxity in preventing atrocities against prisoners of war in Burma. Although the Death Railway was built from 1942 to 1943, and Kimura did not arrive in Burma until late 1944, Kimura was also charged with the abuse and deaths of prisoners of war and civilian laborers used to construct the railroad. Found guilty in 1948 on Counts 1, 27, 29, 31, 32, 54 and 55 of the indictment he was condemned to death by the International Military Tribunal for the Far East and hanged as a war criminal.

== See also ==
- Burma campaign

Military offices
Preceded by Masakazu Kawabe	Commander, Burma Area Army; Aug 1944 – Sept 1946	Succeeded by none
