= Masaki Honda =

Japanese Army general

- 本多 政材
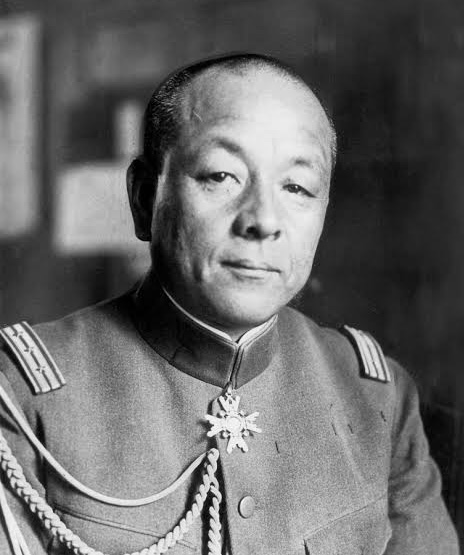
- Born: May 17, 1889; Nagano Prefecture, Japan
- Died: July 17, 1964 (aged 75)
- Military career
- Allegiance: Empire of Japan
- Branch: Imperial Japanese Army
- Service years: 1910–1945
- Rank: Lieutenant General
- Commands: 8th Division; 20th Army; 33rd Army
- Conflicts: Second Sino-Japanese War; World War II; Burma campaign (surrendered)

Masaki Honda (本多政材, Honda Masaki; May 17, 1889 – July 17, 1964) was a lieutenant general in the Imperial Japanese Army in World War II.

== Biography ==
Masaki Honda was born in Nagano prefecture and graduated from the Imperial Japanese Army Academy in 1910 and the Army War College in 1917. He was an instructor and in 1939 Commandant of the Army Infantry School.

After his promotion to Lieutenant-General in October 1939, he became deputy chief of staff of the China Expeditionary Army until October 1940, when he received command of the IJA 8th Division which was active in Manchuria. In June 1942, he was recalled to Japan to become Head of Army Armor Headquarters, until March 1943 when he returned to Manchuria to lead the 20th Army.

On April 7, 1944, a new 33rd Army was raised in Burma in anticipation of Allied attempts to retake northern Burma, and Masaki Honda became its commander. With this outnumbered and ill-equipped Army he fought in the Burma campaign (1944–1945), where he performed very creditable defensive actions against the enemy, including a brilliant evacuation of the IJA 56th Division from under the noses of the advancing Chinese on 4 February 1945. But finally, his scattered and broken army had to withdraw to Southern Burma, where he surrendered in August 1945.

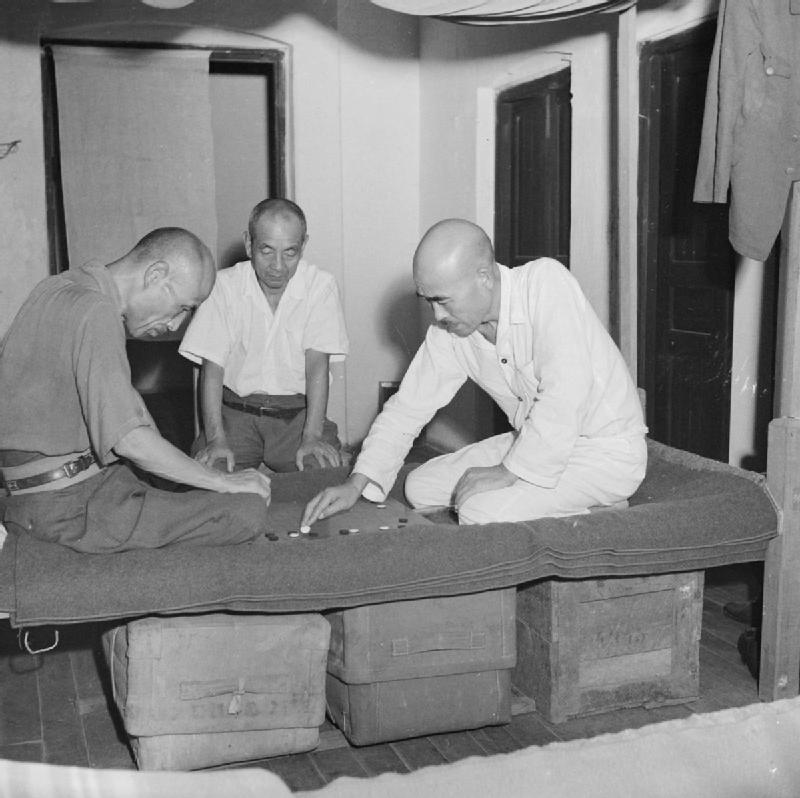
Honda (right) in British captivity

Honda retired from the Army in 1947 and died in 1964.
