= Burma Area Army =

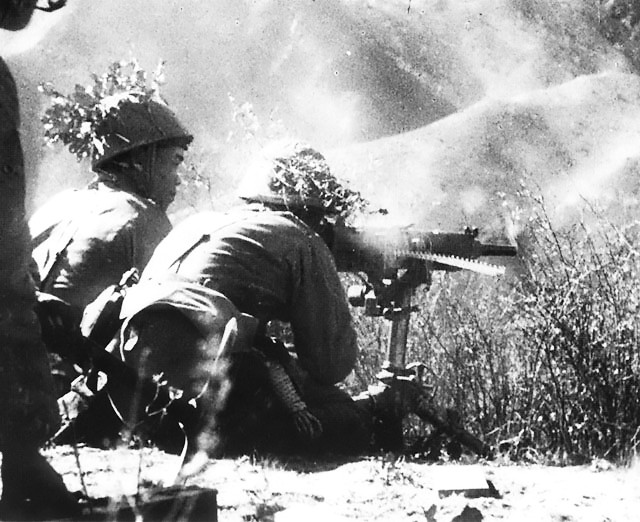
- Japanese troops firing a heavy machine gun
- Active: 27 March 1943 – 15 August 1945
- Country: Empire of Japan
- Branch: Imperial Japanese Army
- Type: Infantry
- Size: Area Army
- Garrison/HQ: Rangoon
- Nickname: 森 Mori (forest)
- Engagements: Burma campaign

The Burma Area Army (緬甸方面軍, Biruma hōmen gun) was one of fifteen area armies (equivalent to field armies in western militaries) of the Imperial Japanese Army (IJA) during World War II that specialized in banzai charge, combined arms, jungle warfare, and maneuver warfare.

== History ==
The Japanese Burma Area Army was formed on 27 March 1943, under the control of the Southern Expeditionary Army Group as a garrison force to defend the nominally-independent State of Burma against liberation by British forces based in neighboring India.

The Japanese Burma Area Army was not equipped as other nominal units of comparable strength due to the dwindling external supply situation mainly because of increasing US and UK attacks on the Japanese naval supply lanes. As a result, many logistical requirements were locally purchased from Myanmar (Burma), Malai (Malaya), and Thailand. In 1943 the main responsibility of the BAA was to quell insurgencies of the Shan, Karen, and other tribal groups in the remote regions, and react to incursions of the Chindits from British India or Kuomintang forces from Yunnan.

For the campaign season of 1944, Lieutenant General Renya Mutaguchi, the commander of the Japanese 15th Army which at the time was assigned to the Japanese Burma Area Army, pressed for an offensive strategy. The resulting Battle of Kohima and Battle of Imphal were among the worst disasters ever suffered by the Imperial Japanese Army. In subsequent operations in the Burma campaign, the Japanese Army continued to suffer massive losses, and after the Battle of Meiktila and Mandalay and Operation Dracula, was all but driven from Burma.

The surviving remnants of the Japanese Burma Area Army surrendered to the Allied forces at Moulmein on 15 August 1945.

== List of Commanders ==
=== Commanding officer ===
	Name	From	To
1	Lieutenant General Masakazu Kawabe	18 March 1943	30 August 1944
2	General Heitarō Kimura	30 August 1944	12 September 1945

=== Chief of Staff ===
	Name	From	To
1	Lieutenant General Eitaro Naka	18 March 1943	22 September 1944
2	General Shinichi Tanaka	22 September 1944	23 May 1945
3	Lieutenant General Tsunamasa Shidei	23 May 1945	29 July 1945
