= Taungup University =

Public university in Myanmar

- တောင်ကုတ်တက္ကသိုလ်
- Former names: Taungup College; Taungup Degree College
- Type: Public
- Established: February 23, 2012; 14 years ago
- Location: Taungup, Rakhine State, Myanmar; 18.850°N 94.233°E

Taungup University (Burmese: တောင်ကုတ်တက္ကသိုလ်; also spelled as Taunggoke University) is a public university located in Rakhine State, Myanmar, established in 2012 to provide higher education in the region.

The university is primarily attended by students from various townships in Rakhine State, such as Toungup, Ann, Ramree, Munaung, Kyaukpyu, and Gwa. The university was established by U Kyauk Taung, the town's mayors, and donors, who jointly purchased 264 acres of land to educate the youth of the region.

== History ==
First established as Taungup College on 23 February 2012, it was upgraded to Taungup Degree College on 11 October 2016, and to the university level on 1 September 2020. However, its formal opening as a university was delayed until January 2022 due to the COVID-19 pandemic. The opening ceremony was attended by State Administration Council Member Daw Aye Nu Sein and other officials.

According to the student union in 2019, Taungup Degree College had about over 6,000 distance learning students from all over the country.

The university has faced significant disruptions due to the Myanmar civil war military situation, with junta soldiers stationed on campus and firing heavy weapons in 2024. The university was removed from the list of Junta approved universities in August 2024 by the Myanmar military government.

In November 2024, the Arakan Army took control of the university including seizing the whole Taungup township.

== Majors ==
The university provides majors including English language, Geography, History, Philosophy, Chemistry, Physics, Mathematics, Zoology, Botany, and Geology.

== See also ==
- List of universities in Myanmar
  - Sittwe University
