= Maei Subtownship =

Maei Subtownship မအီမြို့နယ်ခွဲ
- Subtownship
- Location in Taungup District
- Coordinates: 19.286°N 94.161°E
- Country: Myanmar
- State: Rakhine State
- District: Taungup District
- Township: Taungup Township
- Capital: Maei

Population (2014)
  - Total: 43,904
- Time zone: UTC+6:30 (MMT)

Maei Subtownship (Burmese: မအီမြို့နယ်ခွဲ, MAH-ee MYOH-neh-kweh) is an unofficial subdivision of Taungup Township, Rakhine State, Myanmar. Government offices of Maei Subtownship are located in Toungup. In 2014, the subtownship had a population of 43,904 people. Its principal town is Maei, located on the northern border of the township with Ann Township.

There is a 120,000 acre rubber concession between Maei Subtownship and neighbouring Taungup Township.

In 2022, Taungup Township was split from Thandwe District to create the new Taungup District, moving Ma-ei into the new district.

In 2023, Chinese surveyors, guarded by junta police, worked on a railway within the subtownship to connect Maei and Ann, Myanmar as part of the China–Myanmar Economic Corridor Later the subtownship was captured by the Arakan Army during the Rakhine offensive in mid-2024. By October the subtownship was used to encircle the junta's Western Regional Military Command headquarters in Ann.
