= Kyeintali =

Kyeintali ကျိန္တလီမြို့
- Town
- Kyeintali
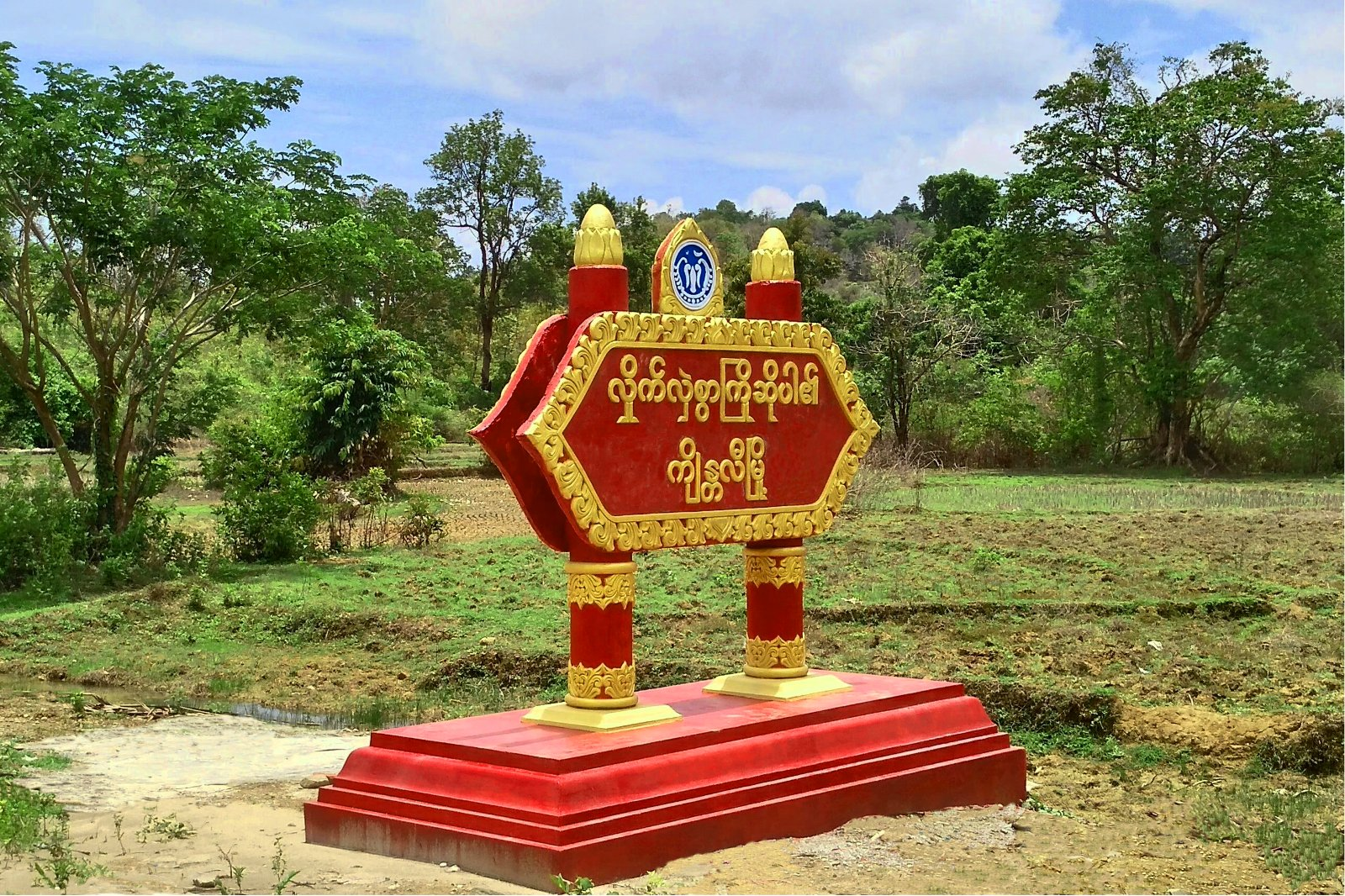
- Welcom sign seen upon entering Kyeintali from the south.

- Location within Myanmar
- Coordinates: 18°00′22″N 94°29′24″E
- Country: Myanmar
- State: Rakhine State
- District: Thandwe Township
- Township: Gwa Township
- Subtownship: Kyeintali Subtownship

Population (2014)
  - Total: 5,871
- Time zone: UTC+6:30 (MMT)
- Postal code: 07182

Kyeintali (Burmese: ကျိန္တလီ) is a town located in Gwa Township of Rakhine State, Myanmar (Burma). The town contains 24.9% of the population of Kyeintali Subtownship.

On 14 August 2024, the town was captured by the Arakan Army.

== Local area ==
The area in and around Kyeintali contains beaches, plains and mountains. Markets are also present in many places. The area is mainly populated by the Rakhine people.

Kyeintali is a 40 km bus or taxi ride south of Ngapali Beach, or a long bus ride from Yangon.

== Natural resources ==
Macrognathus pavo, a species of eel-like fish included in the IUCN Red List of threatened species, is only known to exist in the Kyeintali River in the Rakhine Yoma, Myanmar. It is only known from the headwaters of this river and is likely restricted to that basin. Macrognathus pavo was described in 2010 and further information is required on the species' habitat and ecology, as well as its population and distribution. It is currently assessed as Data Deficient.

== Kyeintali River Bridge ==
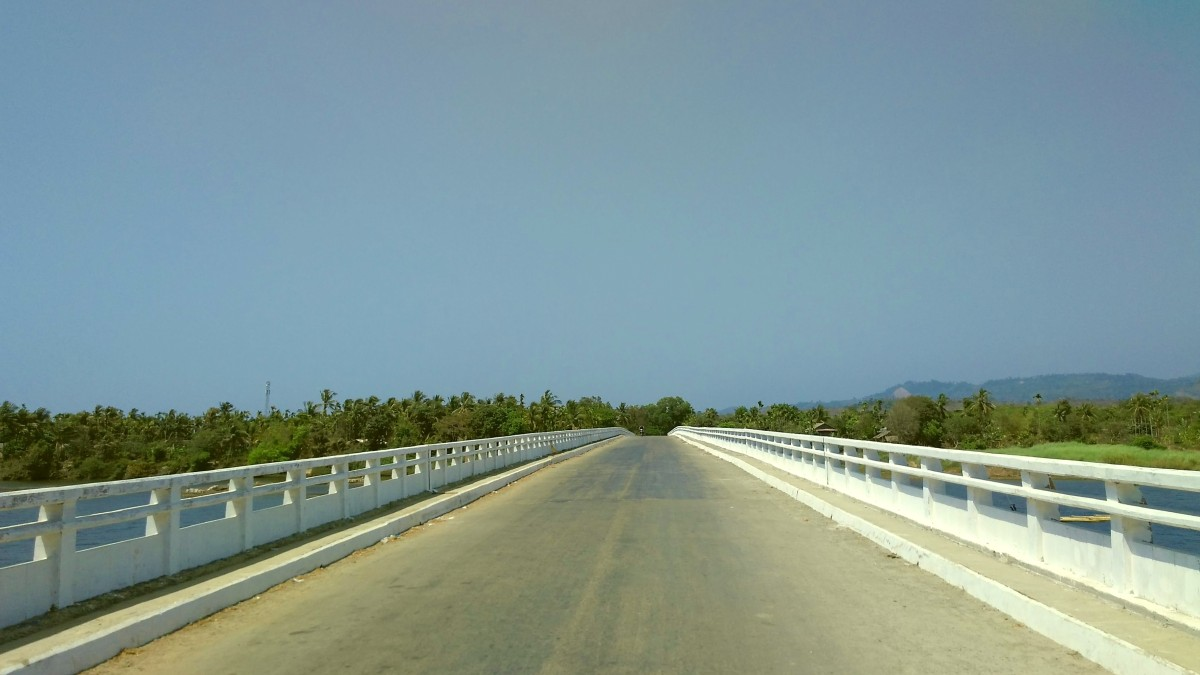
Kyeintali River Bridge

The Kyeintali River Bridge on the Thandwe-Gwa Road in Rakhine State was inaugurated by the Minister for Progress of Border Areas and National Races and Development Affairs Lt-Gen. Maung Thint and SLORC Secretary-1 Lt-Gen. Khin Nyunt. (NLM 1/2)
