= Maei =

Maei မအီမြို့
- Town
- Ma-Ei
- Interactive map of Maei
- Coordinates: 19.344°N 94.1388°E
- Country: Myanmar
- State: Rakhine State
- District: Taungup District
- Township: Taungup Township
- Subtownship: Maei Subtownship

Area
  - Total: 1.703 sq mi (4.41 km^{2})

Population (2019)
  - Total: 5,042
  - Density: 2,961/sq mi (1,143/km^{2})
- Time zone: UTC+6:30 (MMT)
- Postal code: 07162

Maei (Burmese: မအီမြို့, , MAH-ee) or Ma-Ei is a town located in Taungup Township, central Rakhine State, Myanmar. In 2014, the town had 5,444 people, 12.4% of the total population of Maei Subtownship. In 2019 the town had a population of 5,042 and a sex ratio of 1.09.

The town of Ma-Ei is located on the northern border of the township with Ann Township. In 2014, the town had 3 urban wards. By 2024, the town had 4 wards with the fourth ward formerly being Pyin Won.

== History ==
In 2020, the town's Arakan National Party chairman was arrest on suspicion of having links to the rebel group Arakan Army.

After the outbreak of the current Myanmar civil war in 2021, the town was later targeted by the Rakhine offensive. On the night of 16 February 2024, the town was captured by the Arakan Army after the Tatmadaw retreated from the garrison in the town's police station and the nearby Zee Zan Taung military camp. The junta's soldiers' families and military equipment were moved to Ann by helicopter. The State Administration Council had planted a lot of landmines in the town prior to their retreat. The heavy shelling mine explosions caused damage to houses and the town's high school. The Tatmadaw also destroyed the bridge crossing Maei Creek, which connects Ward 4 with the rest of the town, and the Kyaukkyipauk Bridge, which connects the town towards Kyaukphyu.

The town continued to be hit by punitive airstrikes like other resistance-held settlements in Myanmar. On 24 September 2024, the town was bombed killing 14 people, including children, and injuring 25. In August 2025, the town was struck twice by air strikes. In July 2026, the town was hit by air strikes from the Myanmar Air Force, causing 5 civilian deaths and 15 injuries.

== Economy ==
Multiple types of fish are sold at the Maei market with one study in 2020 identifying over 24 speicies of fish. There is also a 120,000 acre rubber concession between Maei Subtownship and neighbouring Taungup Township.

The town has a sixteen bed hospital.
