= Gwa, Myanmar =

Gwa ဂွမြို့
- Town
- Location in Myanmar (Burma)
- Coordinates: 18°29′N 94°17′E
- Country: Myanmar
- Division: Rakhine State
- District: Thandwe District
- Township: Gwa Township

Population (2014 census)
  - Total: 66,015
- Time zone: UTC+6.30 (MMT)

Gwa (Burmese: ဂွမြို့) is a town located at the southern tip of Myanmar's Rakhine State. It is the principal town of Gwa Township. In the 2014 census, the town and surrounding rural areas had a population of 66,015, of which only 7,422 are urban. In December 2024, the Arakan Army took control of the town.

== Climate ==
Like all of Rakhine State, Gwa has a tropical monsoon climate (Köppen Am) with a lengthy dry season from mid-November to April and an extremely wet wet season due to the blocking of moisture-saturated westerly monsoon winds by the Arakan Mountains. Between June and August, as in all of Rakhine State, rainfall typically exceeds 1 metre or 40 inches, and annual rainfall is amongst the highest in Southeast Asia at around 4.5 metres or 180 inches. Temperatures are very warm to hot throughout the year, although cool breezes and comfortable nights during the dry season make conditions fairly pleasant.

Climate data for Gwa, Myanmar (1991–2020)
Month	Jan	Feb	Mar	Apr	May	Jun	Jul	Aug	Sep	Oct	Nov	Dec	Year
Mean daily maximum °C (°F)	29.0 (84.2)	29.8 (85.6)	31.4 (88.5)	33.2 (91.8)	33.0 (91.4)	30.7 (87.3)	29.9 (85.8)	29.6 (85.3)	30.7 (87.3)	31.9 (89.4)	31.5 (88.7)	29.9 (85.8)	30.9 (87.6)
Daily mean °C (°F)	21.2 (70.2)	22.0 (71.6)	24.8 (76.6)	28.1 (82.6)	28.8 (83.8)	27.4 (81.3)	26.8 (80.2)	26.6 (79.9)	27.1 (80.8)	27.3 (81.1)	25.7 (78.3)	23.0 (73.4)	25.7 (78.3)
Mean daily minimum °C (°F)	13.4 (56.1)	14.1 (57.4)	18.1 (64.6)	22.9 (73.2)	24.6 (76.3)	24.0 (75.2)	23.7 (74.7)	23.5 (74.3)	23.4 (74.1)	22.7 (72.9)	20.0 (68.0)	16.1 (61.0)	20.5 (68.9)
Average precipitation mm (inches)	2.4 (0.09)	0.1 (0.00)	4.4 (0.17)	19.2 (0.76)	353.5 (13.92)	1,095.4 (43.13)	1,254.2 (49.38)	1,178.8 (46.41)	635.5 (25.02)	189.5 (7.46)	30.0 (1.18)	8.2 (0.32)	4,771.2 (187.84)
Average precipitation days (≥ 1.0 mm)	0.4	0.1	0.4	1.3	13.6	25.8	28.1	27.5	22.2	12.9	2.6	0.5	135.4
Source: World Meteorological Organization

== Economy ==
Fishing is the primary industry in Gwa. Most residents fish in nearby waters, both for self-sustenance and trade with nearby towns. Rice, bamboo and coconuts are also widely grown in Gwa for export.
