= Manaung Township =

Manaung Township မာန်အောင်မြို့နယ်
- Township
- Location in Taungup district
- Country: Myanmar
- State: Rakhine State
- District: Taungup District
- Time zone: UTC+6:30 (MMT)

Manaung (Burmese: မာန်အောင်မြို့နယ်) is a township of Taungup District in south-central Rakhine State, western Myanmar. The principal town is Manaung. Manaung Township, situated on Manaung Island, consists of three islands: Manaung Island, Ye Kyun Island and Taik Kyun Island. Manaung is not only a township but also the second biggest island of Rakhine State in Myanmar.

== Geography ==
The Bay of Bengal is located to the West and Northwest, Ramree Island in the Northeast, Ye Kyun Island in the South and Taungup in the East. Manaung Island, about 55 miles in circumference, is situated at 18'47 (898'N) and 93'98 (472'E) on the Rakhine Coast of Myanmar.

The highest mountain is 972 feet (296 m) high and the lowest level is 6 feet (1.8 m) above sea level. The population was 95927 on October 31, 2007.

The main Manaung Island lies about 6 mi (9.7 km) from the southwestern coast of Ramree Island. It is located between 18° 40′ and 18° 56′ N. lat., and between 93° 31′ and 93° 50′ E. long. The terrain of the island is quite flat with scattered moderate elevations. The highest point 205 metres (673 ft) is on a ridge in the southwestern part of the island.

Most of the vegetation is tropical rainforest.

== Administration ==
There are 5 wards and 138 villages in Manaung Township.

In 2022, Taungup District was formed, consisting of Taungup Township and Manaung Township. Prior to the new district's formation, the township was part of Thandwe District.

== Attractions ==
There is one township stadium.

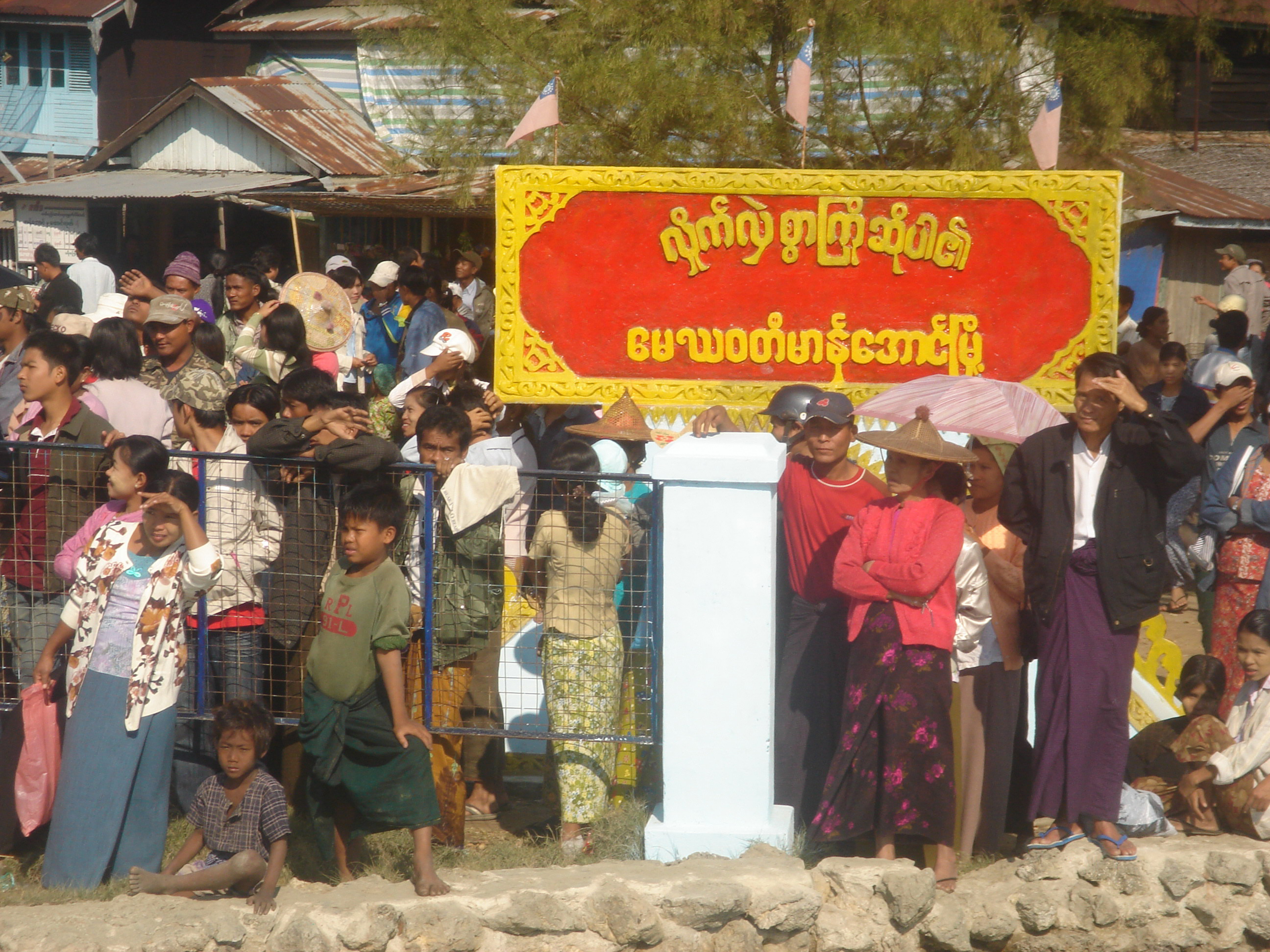
Entry Point of Manaung

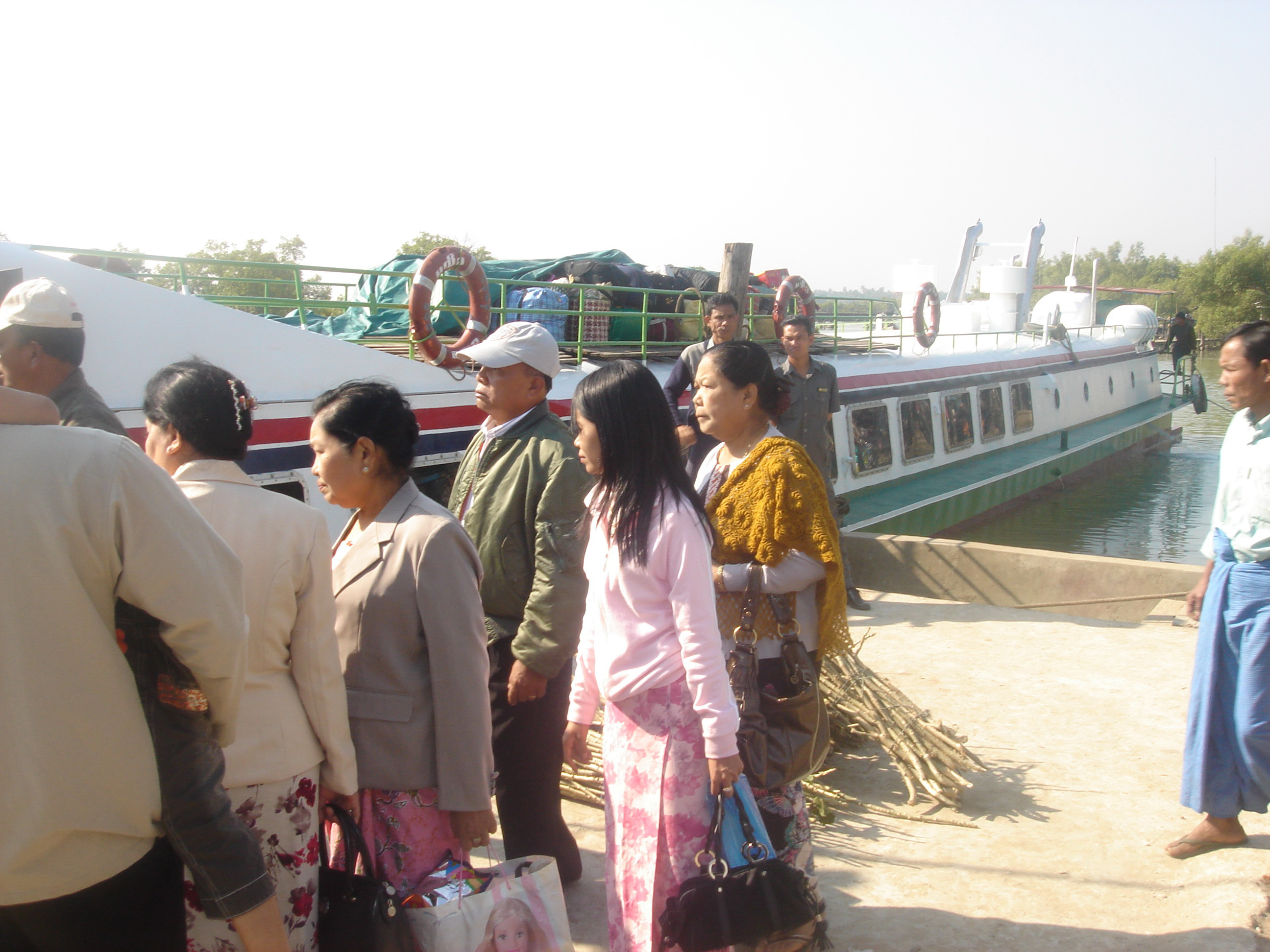
Manaung Township Passenger Transportation

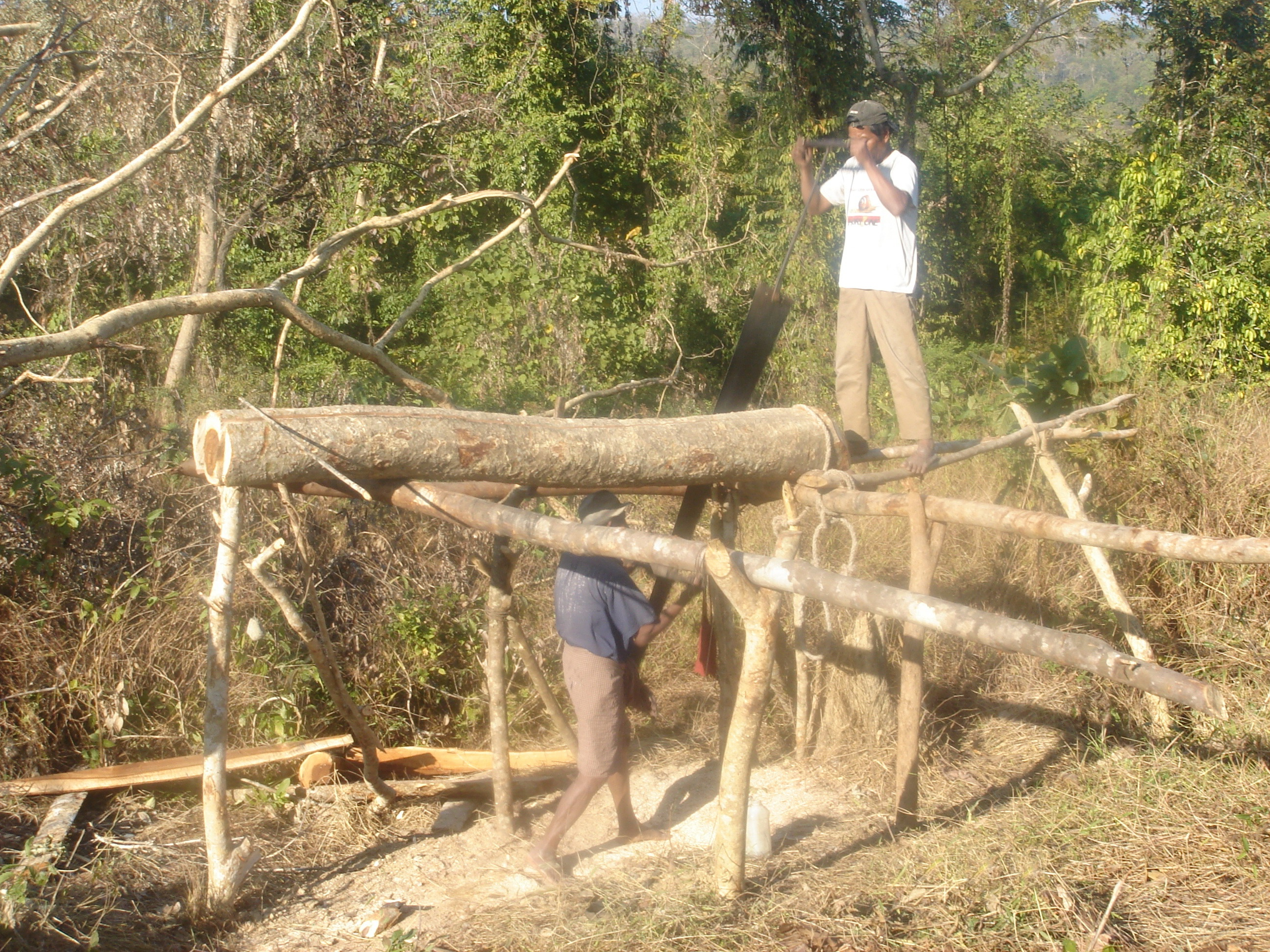
Manaung Township Timber Business

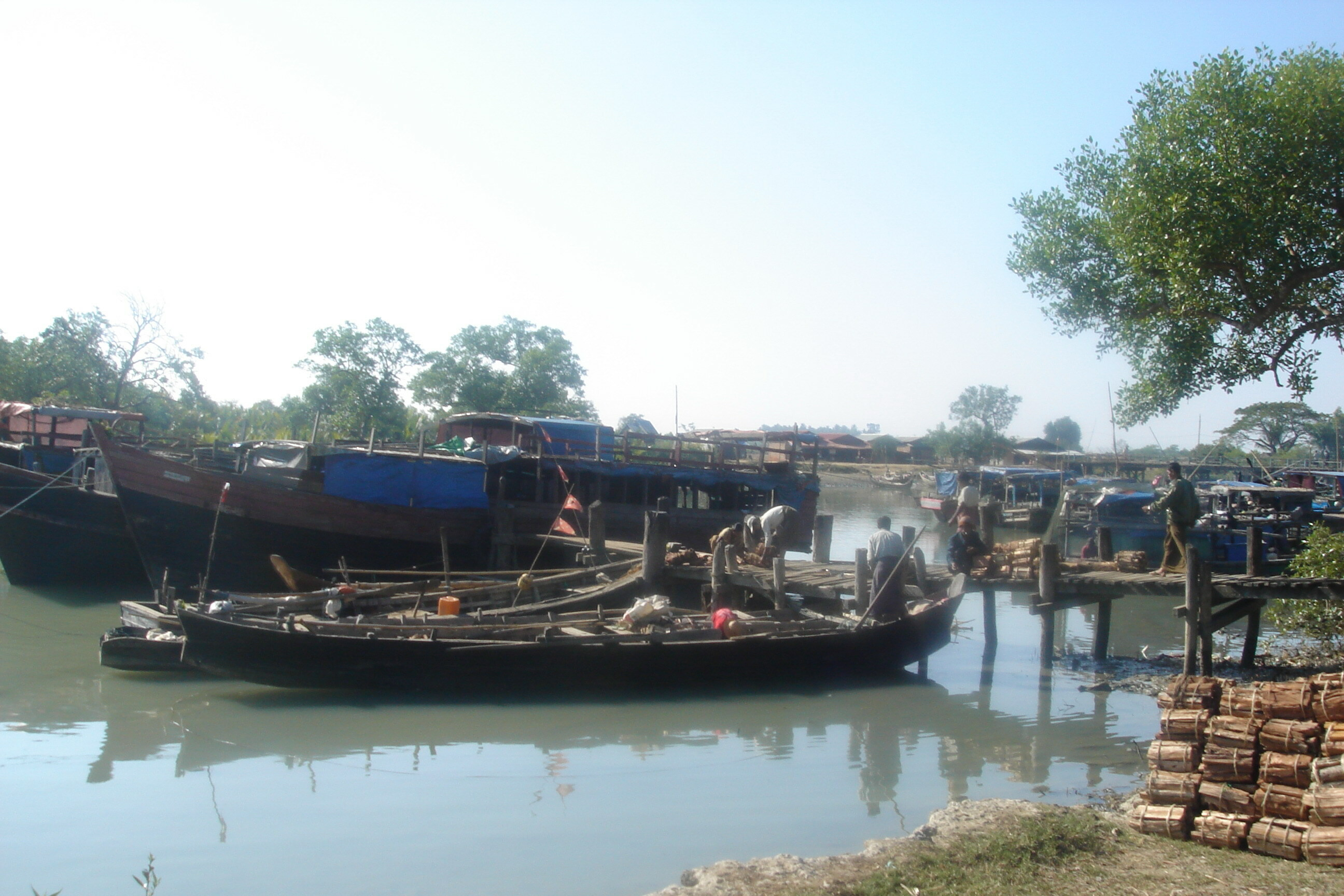
Manaung Township Goods Transportation

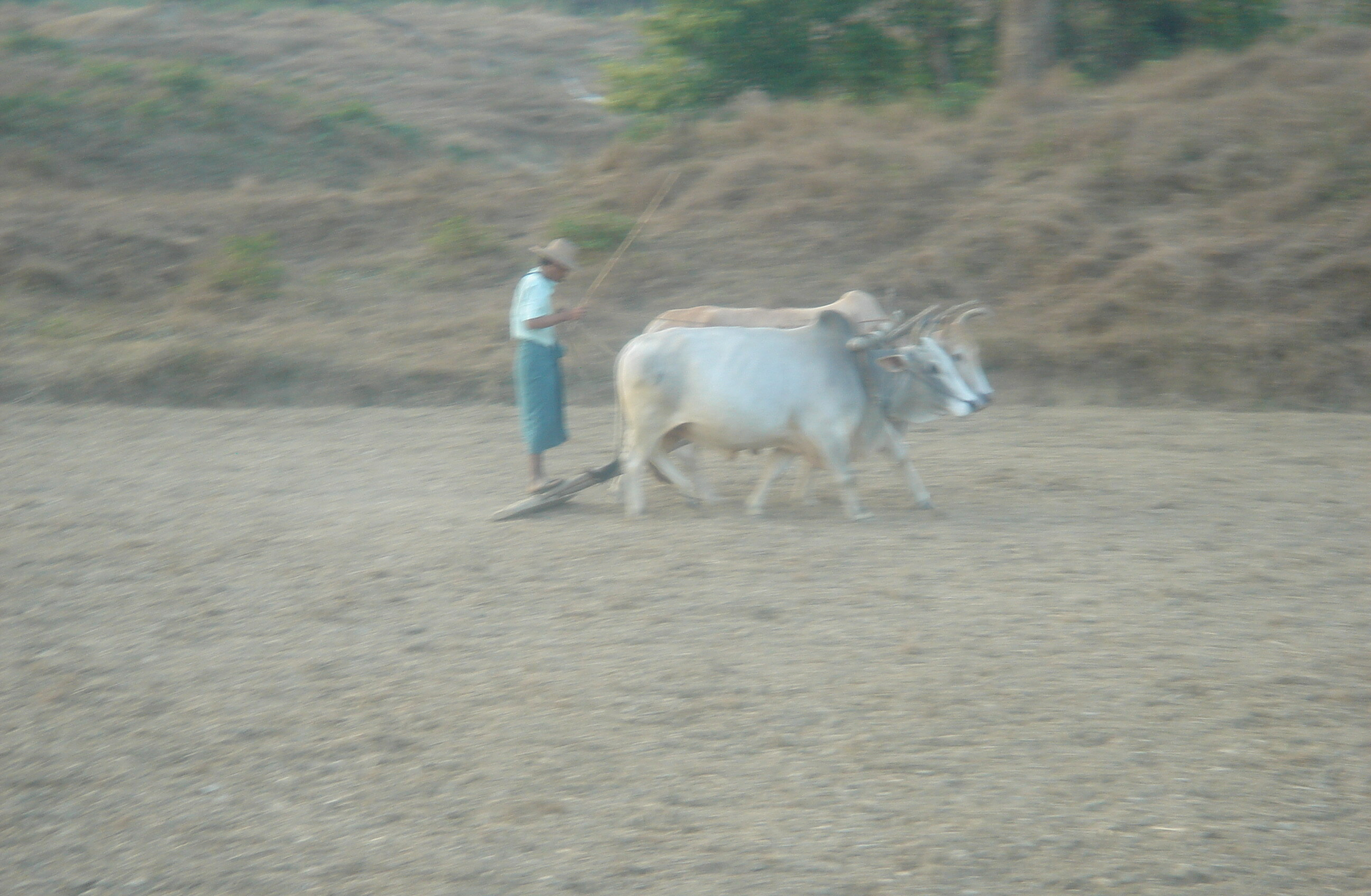
Manaung Township Agriculture

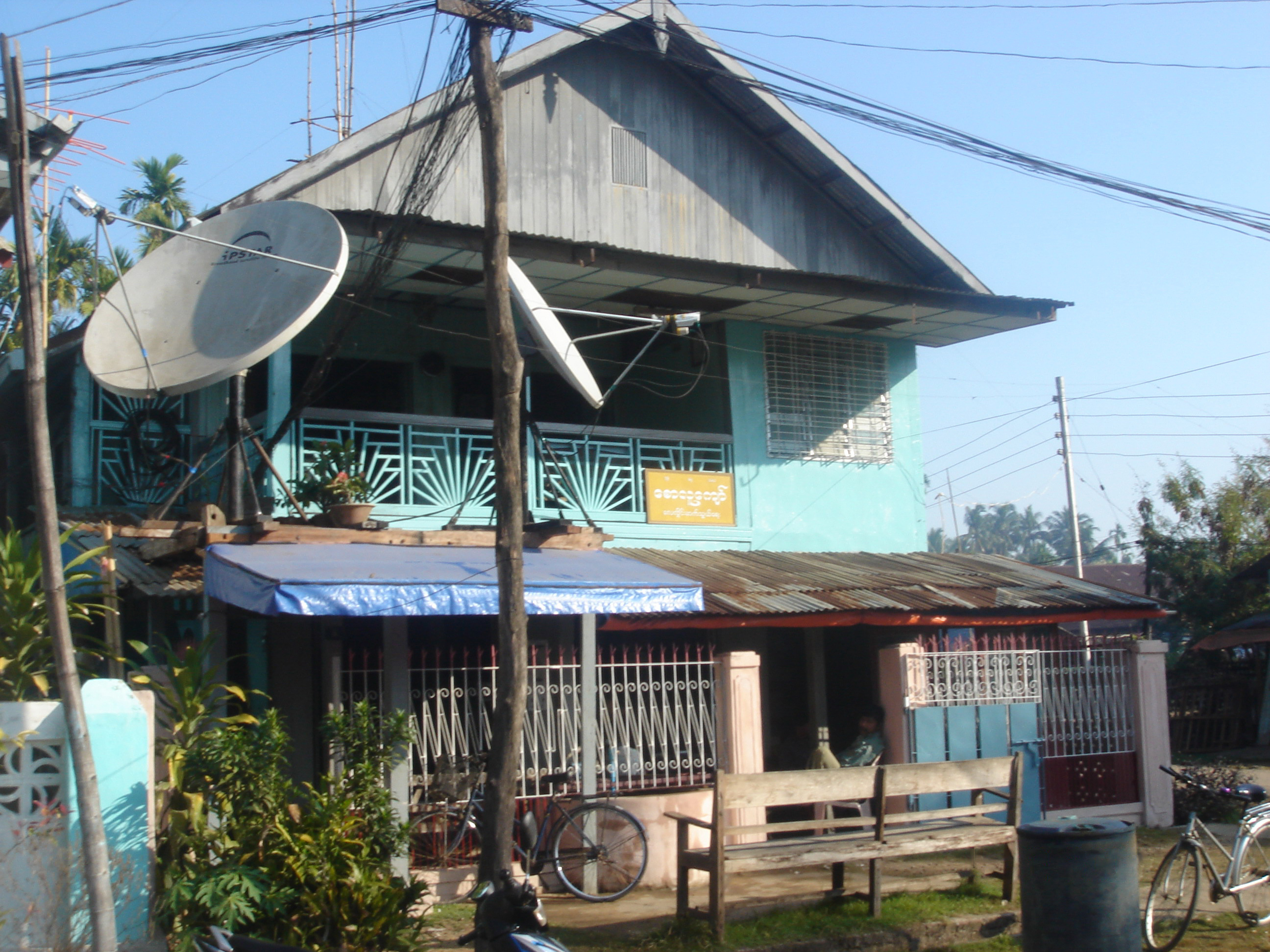
Manaung Township Communication

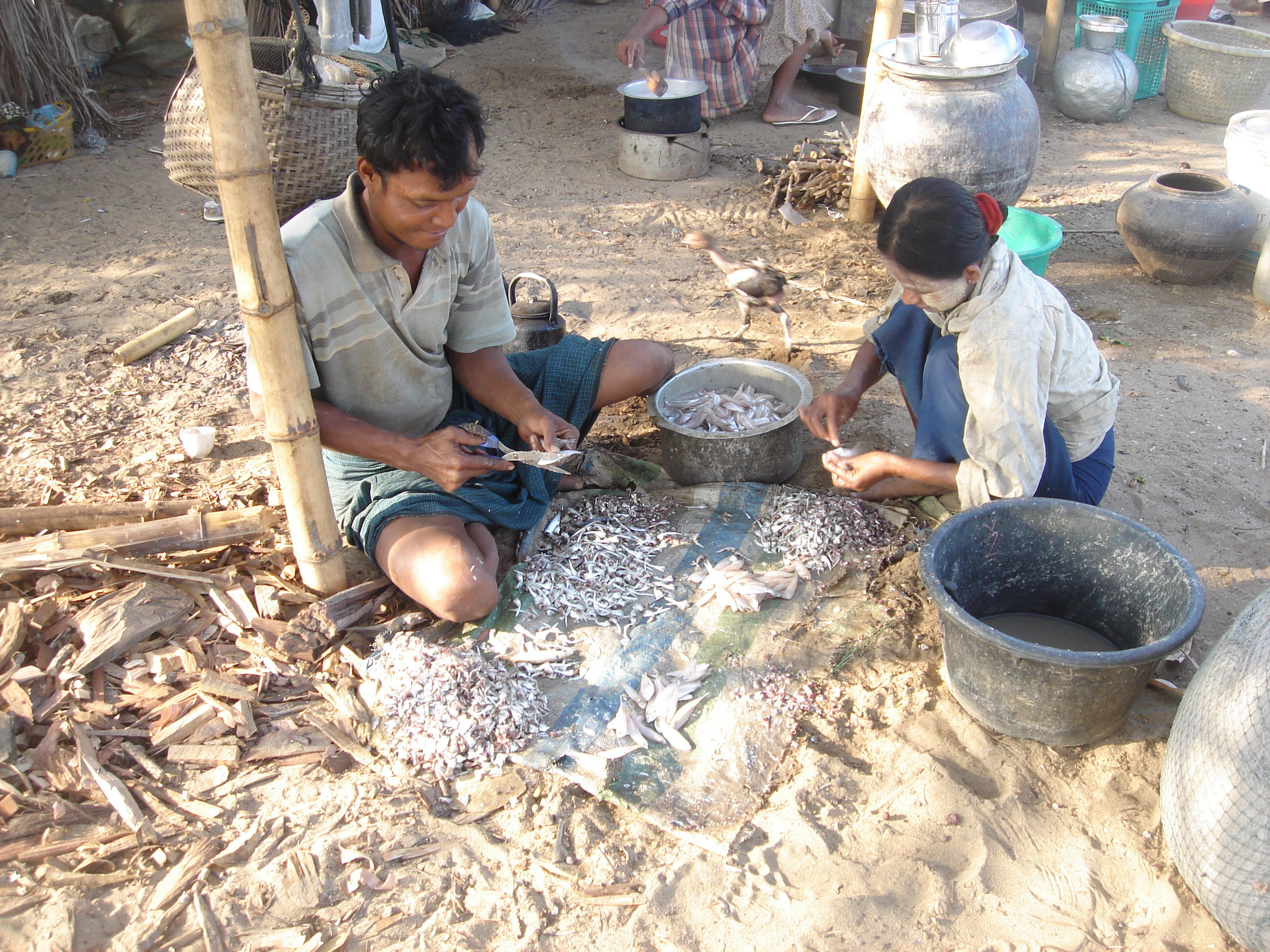
Manaung Township Business

== Education ==
There are 7 high schools, 11 middle schools and 106 elementary schools. There is one nursery school. There are 127 libraries.

== List of Township Administrators ==
- U Tin Than 18-9-1988 to 19-11-1991
- U Mya Than 19-11-1991 to 7-11-1992
- U Maung Than 7-11-1992 to 12-8-1993
- U Oo tun Aung 12-8-1993 to 3-7-1998
- U Han Soe 3-7-1998 to 15-9-1998
- U Sai Maung Nyi 15-9-1998 to 14-1-1999
- U Pot (aka) Thar Moe 14-1-1999 to 7-11-2001
- U Tun San Win 7-11-2001 to 25-7-2002
- U Hla Thein 19-9-2001 to 9-12-2004
- U Naing Tun 9-12-2004 to 16-8-2007
- U Nyi Nyi Lwin 16-8-2007 to present

== See also ==
- Manaung Township Association (Yangon)
