= Kyeintali Subtownship =

Kyeintali Subtownship ကျိန္တလီမြို့နယ်ခွဲ
- Subtownship
- Interactive map of Kyeintali Subtownship
- Coordinates: 18.01°N 94.54°E
- Country: Myanmar
- State: Rakhine State
- District: Thandwe District

Population
  - Total: 23,581
- Time zone: UTC+6:30 (MMT)
- Website: www.kyeintali.com

Kyeintali Subtownship is divided from Gwa Township, Rakhine State. Government offices of Kyeintali Subtownship are located in Kyeintali
