= Twenty-Eighth Army (Japan) =

Japanese Twenty-Eighth Army
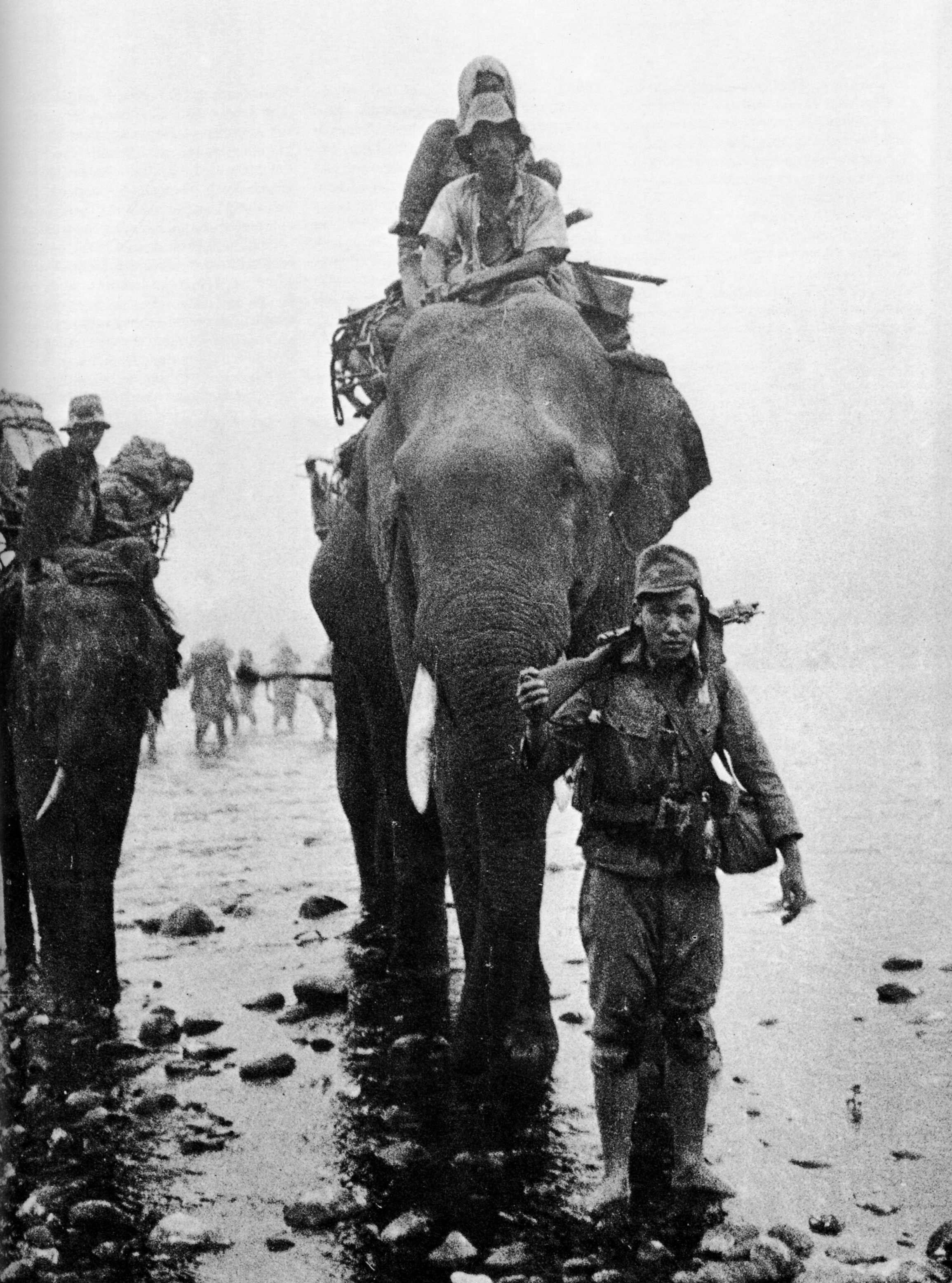
- Japanese troops on elephant in Burma
- Active: 1944–1945
- Country: Empire of Japan
- Branch: Imperial Japanese Army
- Type: Infantry
- Size: Corps
- Garrison/HQ: Moulmein, Burma
- Nicknames: Saku (策, Scheme)

The Japanese Twenty-Eighth Army (第28軍, Dai-nijyūhachi gun) was an infantry corps of the Imperial Japanese Army (IJA) during the final days of World War II that specialized in banzai charge, combined arms, jungle warfare, and maneuver warfare.

== History ==
The Japanese Twenty-Eighth Army was raised on 6 January 1944 in Rangoon in Japanese-occupied Burma as a garrison force and in anticipation of Allied attempts to invade and retake southern Burma. It was under the overall command of the Burma Area Army, and its headquarters were initially situated in Moulmein. It was assigned to defend the coastal region of Arakan and the lower Irrawaddy valley and consisted at first of the 55th Division in Arakan, the 54th Division in reserve in Southern Burma, and various garrison units including the 24th Independent Mixed Brigade in Moulmein.

The Allies had started a cautious offensive in the Arakan. The Japanese had scored a decisive success here in early 1943, striking at the flanks and rear of badly trained and exhausted Allied units. The main body of 55th Division attempted to repeat this success by infiltrating the Allied lines to attack an Indian Division from the rear, overrunning the Divisional HQ. Unlike the previous occasion, the Allied troops were better-trained and did not panic. The Japanese had also not anticipated that the Allies would parachute supplies to the cut-off forward units, while the Japanese themselves were unable to obtain supplies and starved.

Although battle casualties in the resulting Battle of Ngakyedauk (5 to 23 February 1944) were approximately equal, the 55th Division failed in its mission and was forced to withdraw, having suffered heavy losses. The Allies did not immediately exploit their success, as formations were withdrawn to face a major Japanese invasion of India at Imphal. They even withdrew from some of their gains, which were found to be malarial and unhealthy in the monsoon season.

The Twenty-Eighth army used the monsoon to construct the An track across the hills between Central Burma and Arakan, making it easier to supply their troops there. Aided by locally recruited Arakanese irregulars (the Arakan Defence Force) and small units of the Indian National Army, they launched an attack against a West African Division in the Kaladan River valley, forcing it to withdraw almost to the Indian frontier.

When the rains ended, the Allies resumed their offensive. Intelligence of impending Allied amphibious operations forced the 28th Army to weaken the forces in Arakan and disperse many of its troops to Southern Burma. At the end of the year, they abandoned the Mayu Peninsula and the island of Akyab, with its vital airfield. The retreating troops were intercepted by Allied forces which had landed from the sea on the Myebon peninsula, and suffered heavy casualties.

Although the 28th Army subsequently held the An track and the pass linking the port of Taungup to Prome on the Irrawaddy, a regiment was destroyed on Ramree Island (14 January – 22 February 1945). The forces from 28th Army in the lower Irrawaddy Valley (72nd Independent Mixed Brigade) were defeated around Yenangyaung.

With the Allies overrunning Central Burma, the 28th Army tried to retreat across the Irrawaddy, fighting several battles. They were eventually trapped in the Pegu Yomas, a range of low, forested hills between the Irrawaddy and the Sittang River, reduced to approximately 20,000 men. Joined by the former garrison of Rangoon they tried to break out to join the main body of Burma Area Army in Southern Burma (2 July – 7 August 1945). The breakout was a disaster. The Allies had captured the plans for the operation and ambushed almost every track the Japanese used. Hundreds of men drowned trying to cross the swollen Sittang River, and east of the river, stragglers were attacked by guerrillas and bandits. The breakout cost the Army 10,000 men, half its strength.

The Army was demobilized after the surrender of Japan.

== List of Commanders ==
	Name	From	To
Commanding Officer	Lieutenant General Shōzō Sakurai	7 January 1944	September, 1945
Chief of Staff	Major General Hideo Iwakuro	7 January 1944	September, 1945
