= Thandwe Township =

Thandwe Township သံတွဲမြို့နယ်
- Township
- Location in Thandwe district
- Coordinates: 18°28′0″N 94°23′00″E
- Country: Myanmar
- State: Rakhine State
- District: Thandwe District
- Elevation: 5.5 m (18 ft)

Population (2014)
  - Total: 133,484
- Time zone: UTC+6:30 (MMT)

Thandwe Township (Burmese: သံတွဲမြို့နယ်) is a township of Thandwe District in the Rakhine State of Myanmar. The principal town is Thandwe.

== Location ==
| No | Township name | North latitude | | East longitude | | Elevation (ft) |
|---|---|---|---|---|---|---|
| 1 | Thandwe Township | 18 28′ 00″ | 18 27′ 50″ | 94 23′ 00″ | 94 22′ 45″ | 18 |

== Geography ==
Thandwe Township is situated the south of Rakhine State. From east to west, it is 28.33 miles wide and from south to north it is 48 miles wide. The area is 1360.16 square miles or 870,504 acres or 3522,8 square km. There are surrounded by hill and above sea level is 18 feet.

| No | Name of township | Town area (square miles) | Country area (square miles) | Total area (square miles) |
|---|---|---|---|---|
| 1 | Thandwe Township | 1.373 (1,805 acres) | 1,358.787 (868,699 acres) | 1,360.16 (870,504 acres) |

== Population ==
| No | Name of township | Male (above 18) | Female (above 18) | Total (above 18) | | Male (under 18) | Female (under 18) | Total (under 18) | Total males | Total females | Total |
|---|---|---|---|---|---|---|---|---|---|---|---|
| 1 | Thandwe | 39378 | 43215 | 82593 | 15645 | 15104 | 30749 | 55023 | 58319 | 113342 | |

== Family ==
| No | Name of township | Families in town | Families in village | Total |
|---|---|---|---|---|
| 1 | Thandwe | 2,401 | 23,075 | 25,476 |

== House ==
| No | Name | Houses in town | Houses in village | Total |
|---|---|---|---|---|
| 1 | Thandwe | 2,598 | 23,544 | 26,142 |

== Organization ==
| No | District | Township | No of Town | No of Quarter | No of village groups | No of village |
|---|---|---|---|---|---|---|
| 1 | Thandwe | Thandwe | 1 | 7 | 63 | 252 |

== Race ==
In Thandwe township, there are 5 Chinese men, 12 Pakistani men, 6 Kachin ,3 Kayak, 8 Kayin, 3663 Chin, 554 Burmese, 40 Mon, 100,947 Rakhine, 8 Shan and 299 people of other ethnic groups.

== Religious ==
There are 100,871 Buddhists, 8,761 Muslims, 3,705 Christians and 5 Hindus.

== Political party ==
There are 5 parties.
