= Taungup District =

District in Rakhine State, Myanmar

Coordinates: 18.79°N 93.98°E

Taungup District (Burmese: တောင်ကုတ်ခရိုင်) is a district of Rakhine State in western Myanmar. The capital is Taungup. The District was designated in 2022, splitting off parts of Thandwe District and Kyaukphyu District.

Location in Rakhine State

== Townships ==
The district contains the following townships:

- Taungup Township
  - Maei Subtownship
- Manaung Township
