= Shōzō Sakurai =

Japanese lieutenant general (1889–1985)

- 桜井 省三
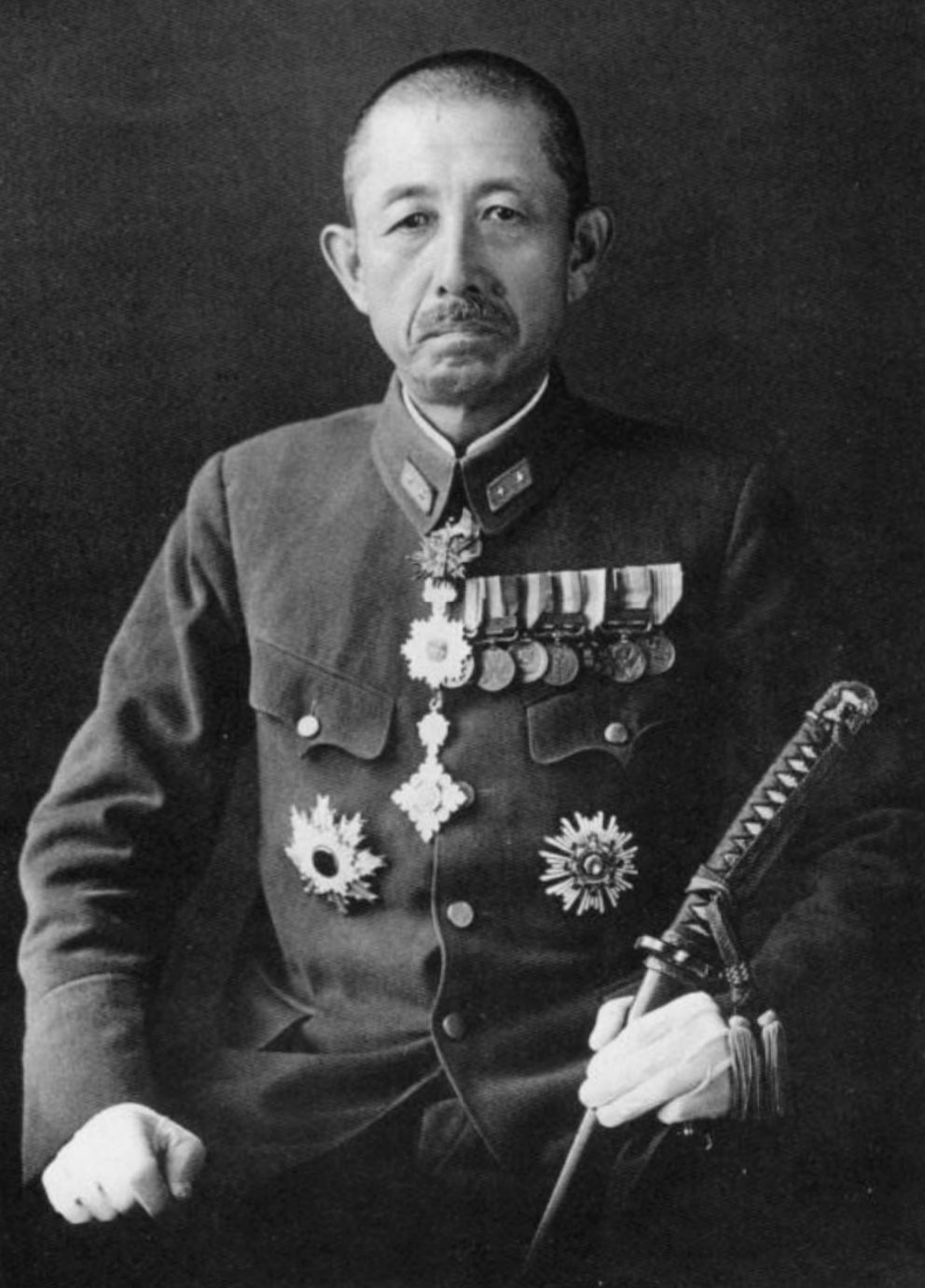
- Born: June 27, 1889; Nagoya, Aichi, Japan
- Died: July 7, 1985 (aged 96); Tokyo, Japan
- Resting place: Tama Cemetery, Fuchū, Tokyo
- Education: Imperial Japanese Army Academy; Army Staff College
- Military career
- Allegiance: Empire of Japan
- Branch: Imperial Japanese Army
- Service years: 1911–1945
- Rank: Lieutenant General
- Units: IJA 53rd Infantry Regiment; Japanese Central China Area Army; Central China Expeditionary Army; IJA 13th Army; IJA 11th Army; Army Ministry
- Commands: IJA 77th Infantry Regiment; IJA 22nd Division; IJA 33rd Division; IJA 28th Army
- Conflicts: Second Sino-Japanese War; Battle of Wuhan; World War II; Burma campaign; Operation Ha-Go; U-Go Offensive
- Other work: Military attaché to France

Shōzō Sakurai (桜井 省三, Sakurai Shōzō; June 27, 1889 – July 7, 1985) was a lieutenant general in the Imperial Japanese Army during the Second Sino-Japanese War and World War II.

== Biography ==
Sakurai was born in Nagoya, although his official records list Hagi city, Yamaguchi prefecture as his hometown. After Sakurai attended military preparatory schools in Nagoya and Tokyo, he graduated from the 23rd class of the Imperial Japanese Army Academy in 1911 and served as a junior officer with the IJA 53rd Infantry Regiment. He graduated with top scores from the 31st class of the Army Staff College in 1919. He was initially an infantry officer, but became a specialist in military transport and logistics. He spent a short time in France as a military attaché. Promoted to lieutenant colonel in August 1930, he served as an instructor at the Staff College from September 1930 to August 1934, when he was promoted to colonel. He then assumed command of the IJA 77th Infantry Regiment to August 1936.

From August 1936, Sakurai served as an investigator for the Cabinet Research Bureau and from May 1937 for the Cabinet Planning Board. He was in charge of harbor facilities and attached to Naval Transport Headquarters. In March 1938 he became Inspector of Central China Harbor Facilities.

With the Second Sino-Japanese War ongoing, Sakurai was assigned command of the Infantry group of IJA 22nd Division in July 1937. This was a new division created out of minimally-trained reservists, and was assigned to the Japanese Central China Area Army. It participated at the Battle of Wuhan, although its primary duty was initially to serve as a garrison force for the Hangzhou area. Sakurai was promoted to major general in May 1938. From May 1939, he was attached to the staff of the Central China Expeditionary Army, and became Chief of Staff of the IJA 13th Army in September 1938. This army was based in Shanghai and its surrounding provinces primarily as a garrison force to maintain public order, as well as to engage in counter-insurgency operations in conjunction with the collaborationist forces of the Reformed Government of the Republic of China. He was promoted to lieutenant general in December 1940.

In 1941 Sakurai was assigned to command the IJA 33rd Division in China under the IJA 11th Army, and participated in the invasion of Siam and Burma in the Burma campaign, and was garrisoned in Arakan. In 1943, Sakurai was reassigned back to Japan as head of the Armored Warfare Department under the Army Ministry. However, in 1944, Sakurai returned to Burma as Commander of IJA 28th Army. His army invaded the Arakan (Operation Ha-Go) to draw the British Army away from Imphal in support of Japanese armies in the U-Go Offensive. By February 22, 1944, the IJA 28th Army had been repulsed with heavy losses and was in retreat. By July 20, 1945, Sakurai had withdrawn to Moulmein, which he held until the end of the war.

After the end of the war, he spent two years in a prisoner camp in Burma with his soldiers, refusing repatriation until the last of his men could depart. He was finally repatriated back to Japan in June 1947. He died in Tokyo at the age of 96, and is buried in the Tama Cemetery in Fuchū, Tokyo.
