= Gwa Township =

Coordinates: 18.4833°N 94.2833°E

Gwa Township ဂွမြို့နယ်
- Township
- Location in Thandwe district
- Country: Myanmar
- Division: Rakhine State
- District: Thandwe District

Area
  - Total: 871 sq mi (2,256 km^{2})

Population (2014 census)
  - Total: 66,015
  - Density: 75.8/sq mi (29.27/km^{2})
- Time zone: UTC+6:30 (MMT)

Gwa Township (Burmese: ဂွမြို့နယ်) is a township of Thandwe District in Rakhine State, Myanmar. The principal town is Gwa. The township contains the Kyeintali Subtownship.
