= Thandwe District =

Coordinates: 18°31′N 94°31′E

Thandwe District (Burmese: သံတွဲခရိုင်) is a district of Rakhine State in western Myanmar. The capital is Thandwe. As of 2015 it had a population of 357,840. The local population is diverse and deeply connected with that of Rakhine State.

Location in Rakhine State

== Townships ==
In 2022, Taungup Township which was formerly part of Thandwe District was split off to form part of Taungup District.

Today, the district contains the following townships:

- Thandwe Township
- Gwa Township
  - Kyeintali Subtownship

== Ngapali Beach ==
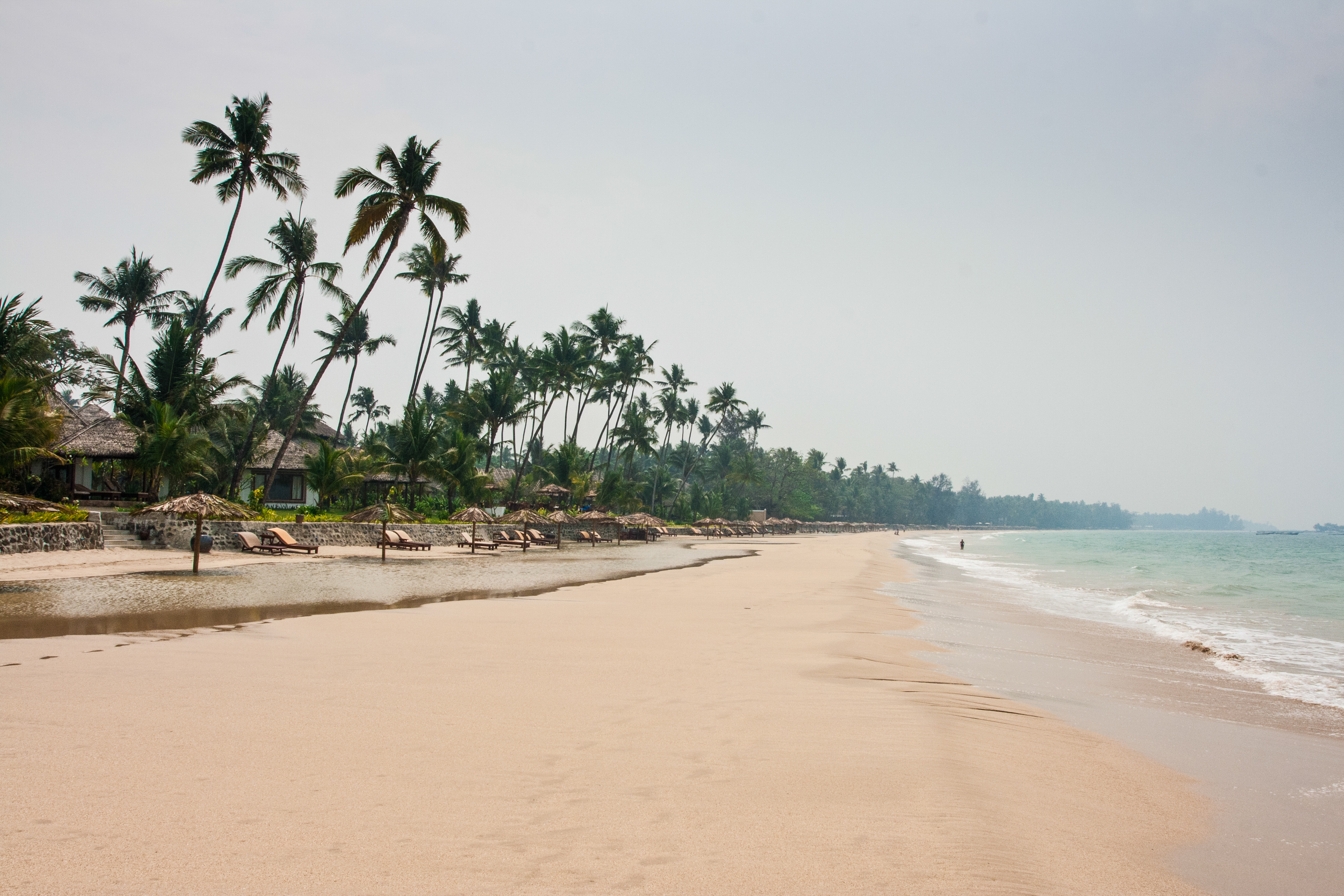
Palms and holiday chalets on Ngapali Beach

Ngapali Beach is a popular tourist destination 7 kilometres (4.3 mi) from Thandwe, near LinThar Village. The beach stretches for 3 kilometres (1.9 mi) along the Indian Ocean.

Ngapali Beach has been promoted as a major tourist destination in Myanmar. Several resorts and hotels are located in Ngapali, usually high end - such as Bayview Ngapali, Amata Resort, Amazing Ngapali and the government-owned Anawa. Ngapali used to have private bungalows, but these were torn down in the late 1990s to make way for the development of hotels. The hotels and tourist industry provide income for the villages around Ngapali and Thandwe. There is also a golf course nearby.

The beach is served by Thandwe Airport. All of Myanmar's internal airlines fly to Thandwe.

White Sand Island and Pearl Island are attractive to visitors for snorkeling and taking photos. In addition, there is an elephant camp that attracts foreigners who visit Ngapali.
