= Taungup Township =

Taunggoke Township တောင်ကုတ်မြို့နယ် Taungup Township
- Township
- Location in Thandwe district
- Coordinates (the geographic center of the township): 19°0′0″N 94°22′30″E
- Country: Myanmar
- State: Rakhine State
- District: Taungup District
- Capital: Taungup

Area
  - Total: 2,057.25 sq mi (5,328.3 km^{2})
- Elevation: 18 ft (5.5 m)

Population (2023)
  - Total: 159,163
  - Density: 77.3669/sq mi (29.8715/km^{2})
  - Ethnicities: Rakhine; Chin
  - Religions: Buddhism
- Time zone: UTC+6:30 (MMT)

Taungup Township (Burmese: တောင်ကုတ်မြို့နယ်) is a coastal township of Taungup District in the Rakhine State of Myanmar. The town is Taungup. The township has three towns, the principal town Taungup, Ma-Ei and Thanlwe Ywama, comprising a total of 14 urban wards as well as 52 village tracts grouping together 203 villages.

In 2014, the township had a population 114,437 people. In 2019, the population grew to 154,239 people.

In 2022, Taungup District was formed, consisting of Taungup Township and Manaung Township. Prior to the new district's formation, the township was part of Thandwe District.

== Towns ==
Ma-Ei is located on the northern border of the township with Ann Township. the town has a sixteen-bed hospital.

Thanlwe Ywama has town status as of 2023, but did not in 2019.

== Other settlements ==
Principle villages include:

- Kan Pyin,
- Kyauk Seik Taung,
- Let Pan Kyun,
- Maung,
- Moe Kyauk Gyi Kwin,
- Myo Taung Gyi,
- Nat Maw,
- Nga Lone Maw,
- Pa Dar,
- Sa Lu,
- Tar Ye,
- Taung,
- Thin Chi Kaing,
- Te Mauk, and
- Zee Kwin.
- kindoung
- tayaba
- kyepyin
- Pauk Inn
