= Taungup =

Taungup Taunggoke
- Town
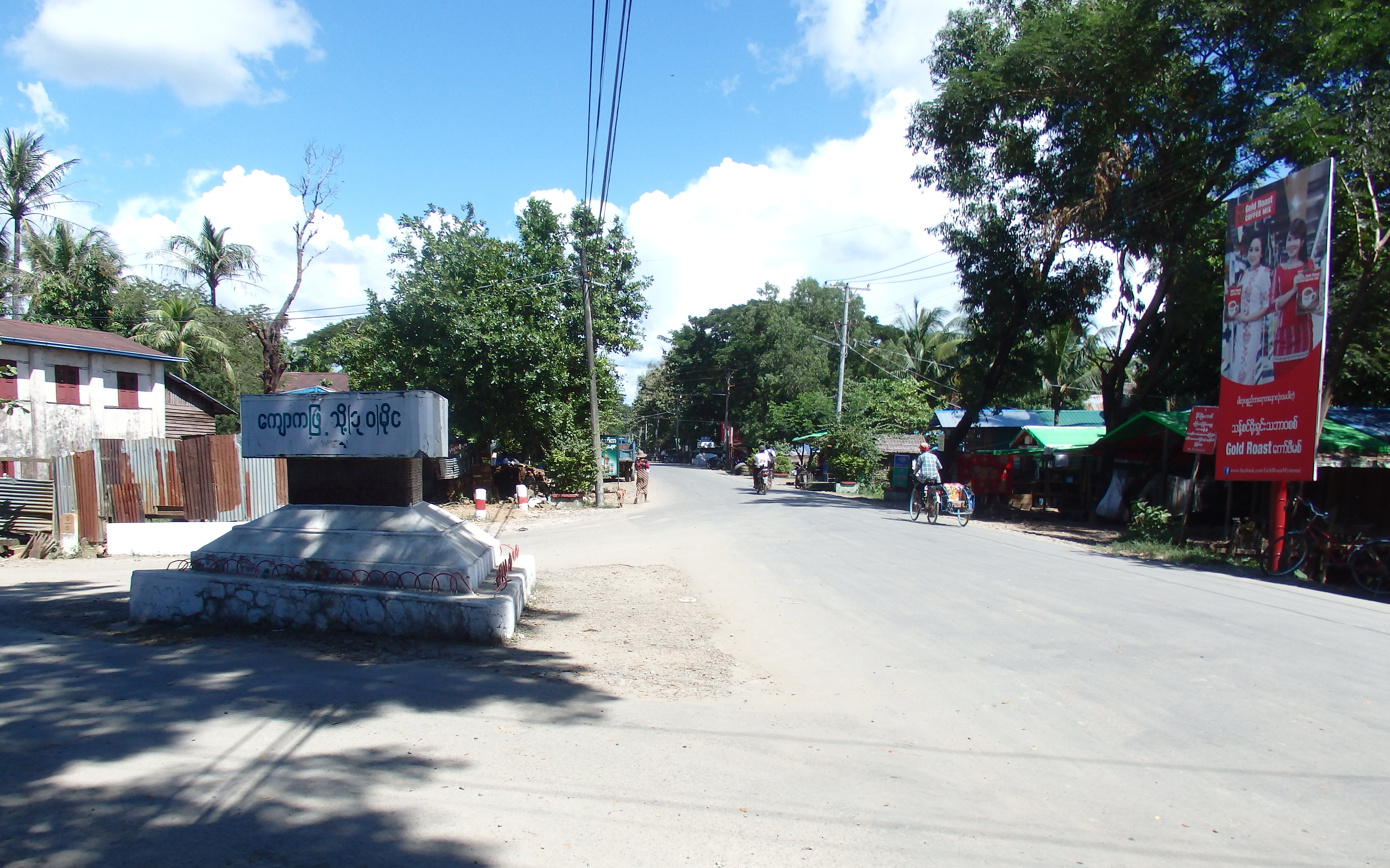

- Location within Myanmar
- Country: Myanmar
- State: Rakhine State
- District: Taungup District
- Township: Taungup Township

Area
  - Total: 1.425 sq mi (3.69 km^{2})

Population (2019)
  - Total: 26,854
  - Density: 18,840/sq mi (7,276/km^{2})
- Time zone: UTC+6:30 (MMT)

Taungup, Toungup, or Taunggoke (Burmese: တောင်ကုတ်မြို့) is the principal town of the Taungup Township and Taunggup District in Rakhine State, western Myanmar. In 2014, the town had a population of 28,652. In 2019, the population was lower at only 26,854 people.

Taungup is the location of Taunggoke University, one of two universities in Rakhine. The university is officially called Taunggoke Degree College.

== History ==
Taungup received 29.1 inches of rainfall on 21 July 2011, a record breaking amount that caused severe flooding.

During the Myanmar civil war, the Arakan Army attacked the town, causing clashes around the Taunggoke University. On 14 December 2024, AA captured the town.
